= Piotrkowski =

Piotrkowski may refer to:

- Gracjan Piotrkowski (1734–1785), Polish Catholic priest, teacher and writer
- Piotrków County, powiat piotrkowski, unit of territorial administration and local government (powiat) in Łódź Voivodeship, central Poland
