= Church of St. Michael the Archangel, Sandomierz =

Catholic church in Poland

Church of St. Michael the Archangel
- Kościół św. Michała Archanioła w Sandomierzu
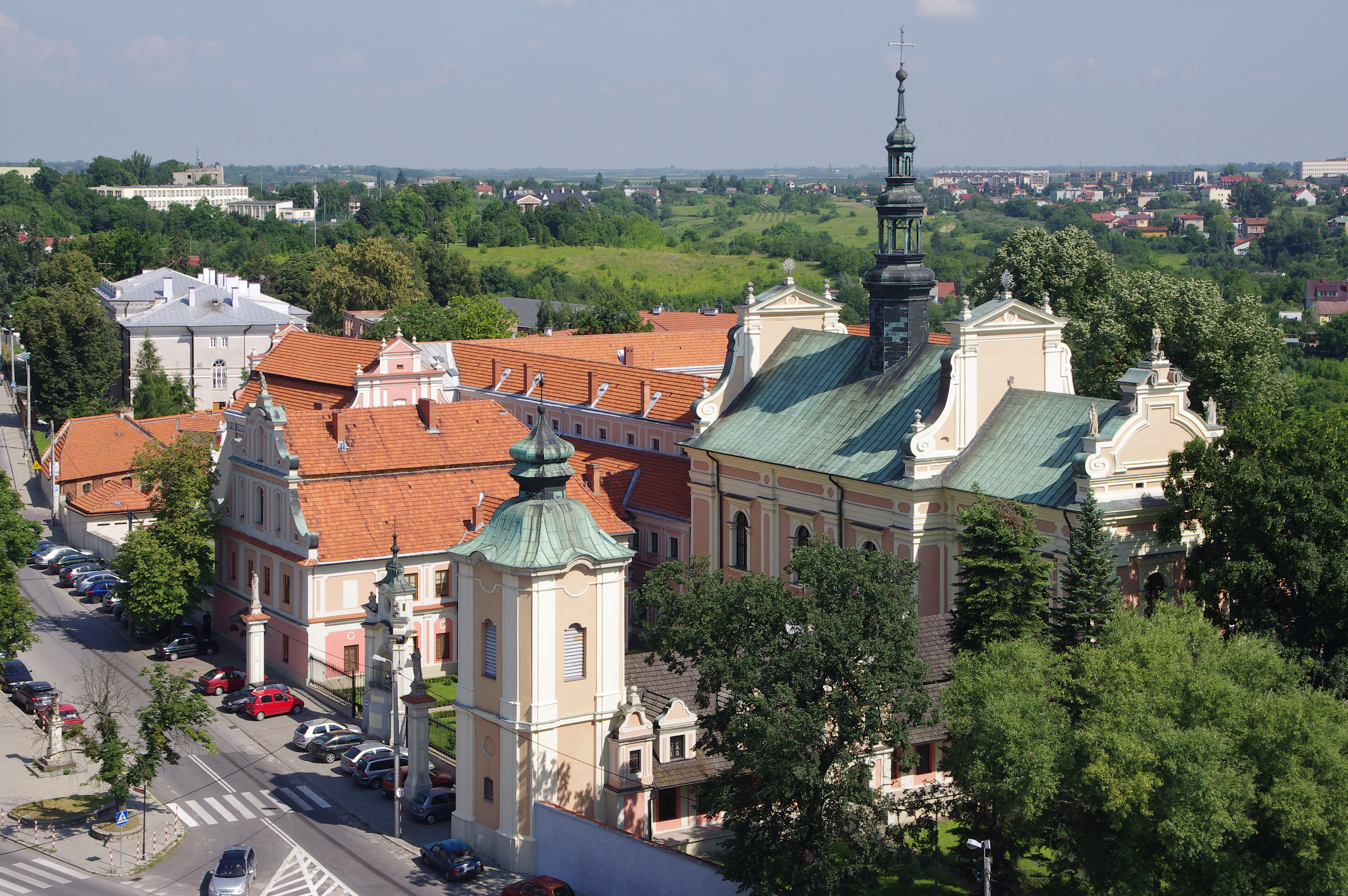
- (Credit: Jakub Hałun)
- Church of St. Michael the Archangel
- 50°40′58″N 21°44′57″E

Architecture
- Style: Baroque
- Years built: 1686-1692

The Church of St. Michael the Archangel is a Catholic church in Sandomierz, Poland. It was founded in the 17th century and is a registered monument in Poland.

The church is directly adjacent to the Higher Theological Seminary of Sandomierz.

== History ==
Michał Link, an architect from Zamość, designed the church. Construction began in 1686 when Bishop of Kraków Jan Małachowski laid the cornerstone. The construction concluded in 1692. According to historian Jerzy Gąssowski, other individuals involved with the founding included a local judge from Sandomierz who gave 50,000 złoty for the construction.

The original adjacent monastery has housed the Higher Theological Seminary since 1903.

== Architecture ==
The church has barrel vaults and one nave. A notable wood carving depicts a genealogy of the Benedictines. The church also features a detached baroque belfry.

== See also ==
- Baroque in Poland
- Sandomierz Synagogue, a baroque synagogue in Sandomierz
