= Marianna Moszyńska =

Polish composer and writer

Marianna Moszyńska (1710–?), was a Polish composer and writer. She was a nun in the Benedictine convent in Sandomierz. She wrote about ten musical manuscripts and compositions for Antiphonary, working with the musicians associated with the convent. Her ability was famed and Christian Joseph Ruth dedicated several works to her.
