= Długosz House (Sandomierz) =

15th century brick structure

Długosz House in Sandomierz
- Dom Długosza w Sandomierzu
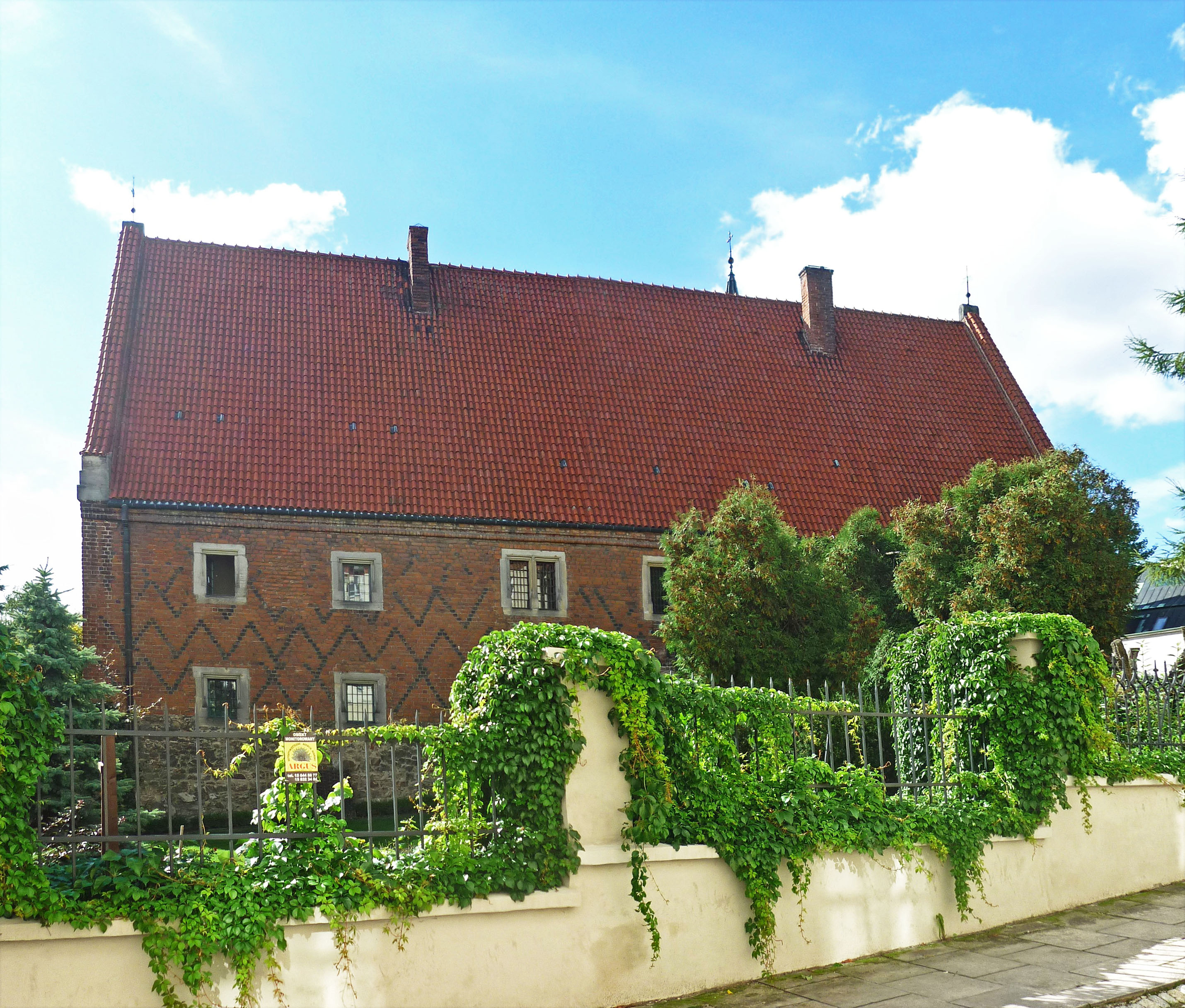
- Building in 21st century

General information
- Status: Museum
- Location: Sandomierz
- Coordinates: 50°40′36.7″N 21°45′01.9″E
- Year(s) built: 15th century
- Designations: Register of monuments

The Długosz House is a 15th century mansionary structure in Sandomierz, Poland. The structure was financed and built with the support of Jan Długosz. The building is on the register of monuments in Poland, and it composes part of the historic portion of old Sandomierz.

== History ==
Financial support for the structure was derived from Długosz's own wealth and the wealth of two prebendaries in Sandomierz.

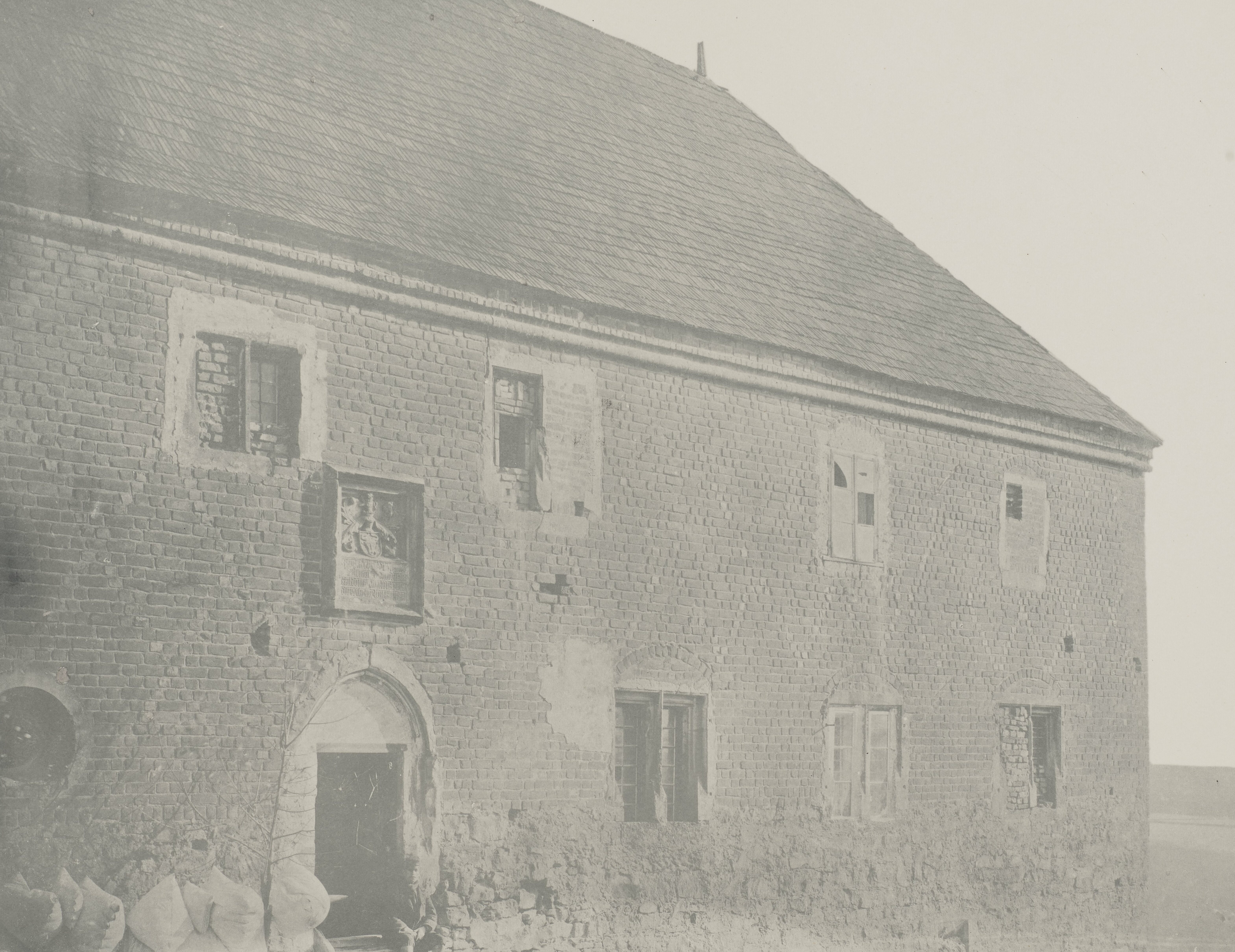
The building in the late 19th century

Professor Heinrich von Zeissberg noted a construction date of 1475. According to Zeissberg, Długosz's letters from the period indicate a slow rate of construction. Historian Michał Bobrzyński states that Długosz controlled the construction of the mansionary building in Sandomierz by way of correspondence and visits to the site.

In 1918, editor Mieczysław Treter published accounts of the status of the structure. Church workers still resided in the building, but it was in "a visible state of neglect." There was a hole in the ceiling, and stained-glass windows had been plastered.

In 2018, the structure, by then a diocesan museum, was mentioned in the Michelin Guide.

== See also ==
- Długosz House in Kraków
- Długosz House in Wiślica
- Gothic architecture in modern Poland
