= Sandomierz Castle =

Coordinates: 50°40′34″N 21°44′50″E

Sandomierz Royal Castle Zamek Królewski w Sandomierzu (in Polish)
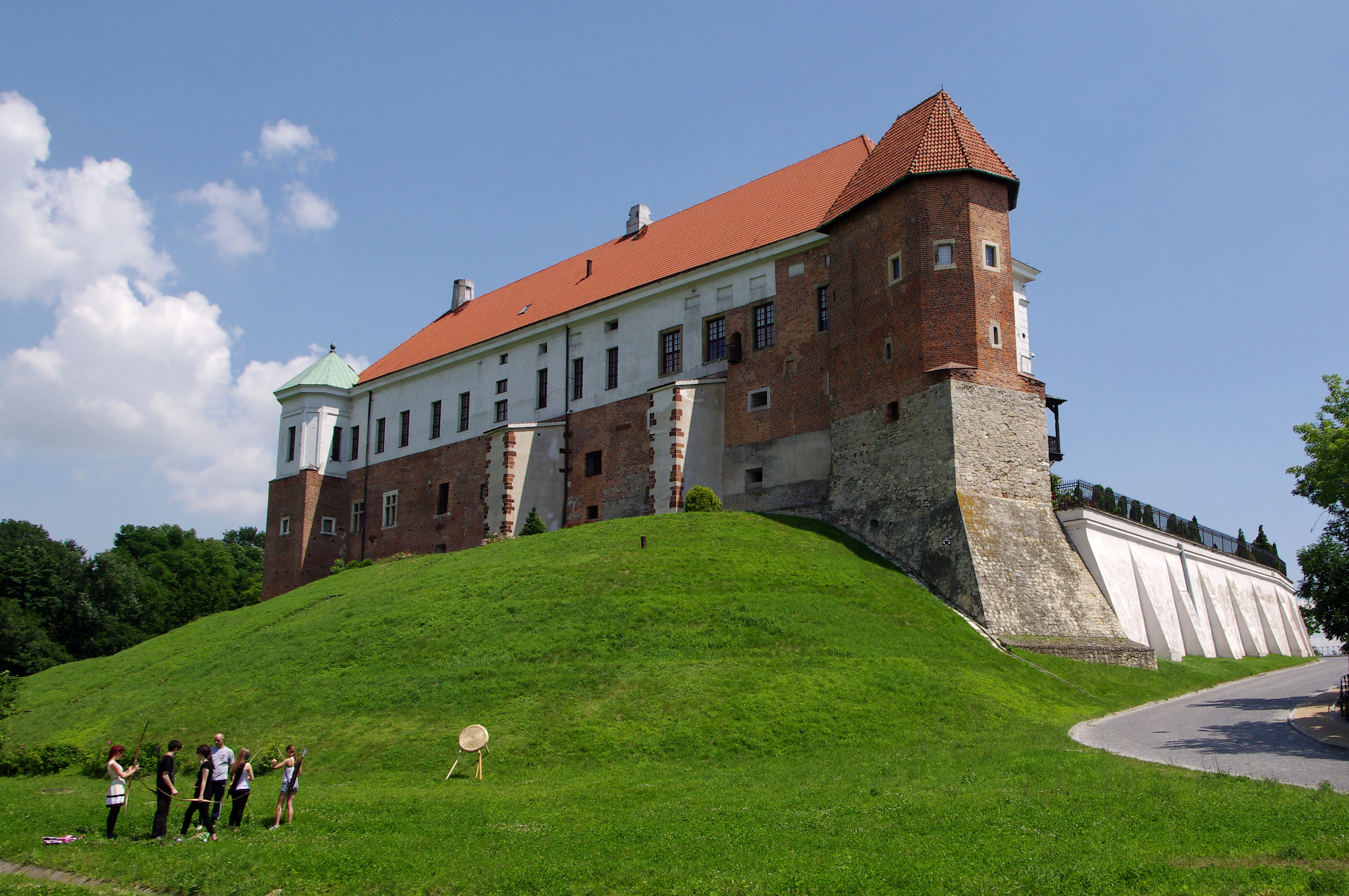
- The west wing of the castle
- Interactive map of the Sandomierz Royal Castle; Zamek Królewski w Sandomierzu (in Polish) area

General information
- Architectural style: Polish Gothic
- Location: Sandomierz, Poland
- Construction started: 14th century
- Demolished: 1656
- Client: Casimir III the Great

The Sandomierz Royal Castle (Polish: Zamek Królewski w Sandomierzu) is a medieval structure in Sandomierz, Poland. It was built on a slope of Vistula River by Casimir III the Great and extended in the 16th century. The original building was blown up in 1656, leaving only the west wing standing. It was later transformed into a Renaissance styled residence with the west wing preserved as a museum.

== History ==
The 14th-century castle was built on the site of the existing stronghold in the 10th century. Between 1146 and 1166 it was the seat of Prince Henry of Sandomierz, son of Bolesław III Wrymouth. The Gothic castle was built by Casimir the Great. The remnants of the Gothic structure are visible in the foundations of the octagonal tower of the south corner, which is the oldest part of the monument. The existing tower was built during the reign of Casimir IV Jagiellon in the 15th century as an integral part of the so-called Great House, the seat of the prince.

During the reign of Sigismund I the Old and Sigismund II Augustus, the castle was enlarged. The Sigismund the Old's cornerstone preserved above the entrance on the east side of the array. It bears the date 1520 and a cartouche with Sigismund's eagle. The construction was supervised by the royal architect Benedyct Sandomierski, who erected two-storey arcaded cloisters around a closed courtyard.

During the Deluge the castle was blown up by the retreating Swedish troops of general Sincler. About fifty Poles, who entered the abandoned castle, were killed. The survived western wing of the castle was later rebuilt during the reign of king John III Sobieski between 1680 and 1688.

== Gallery ==
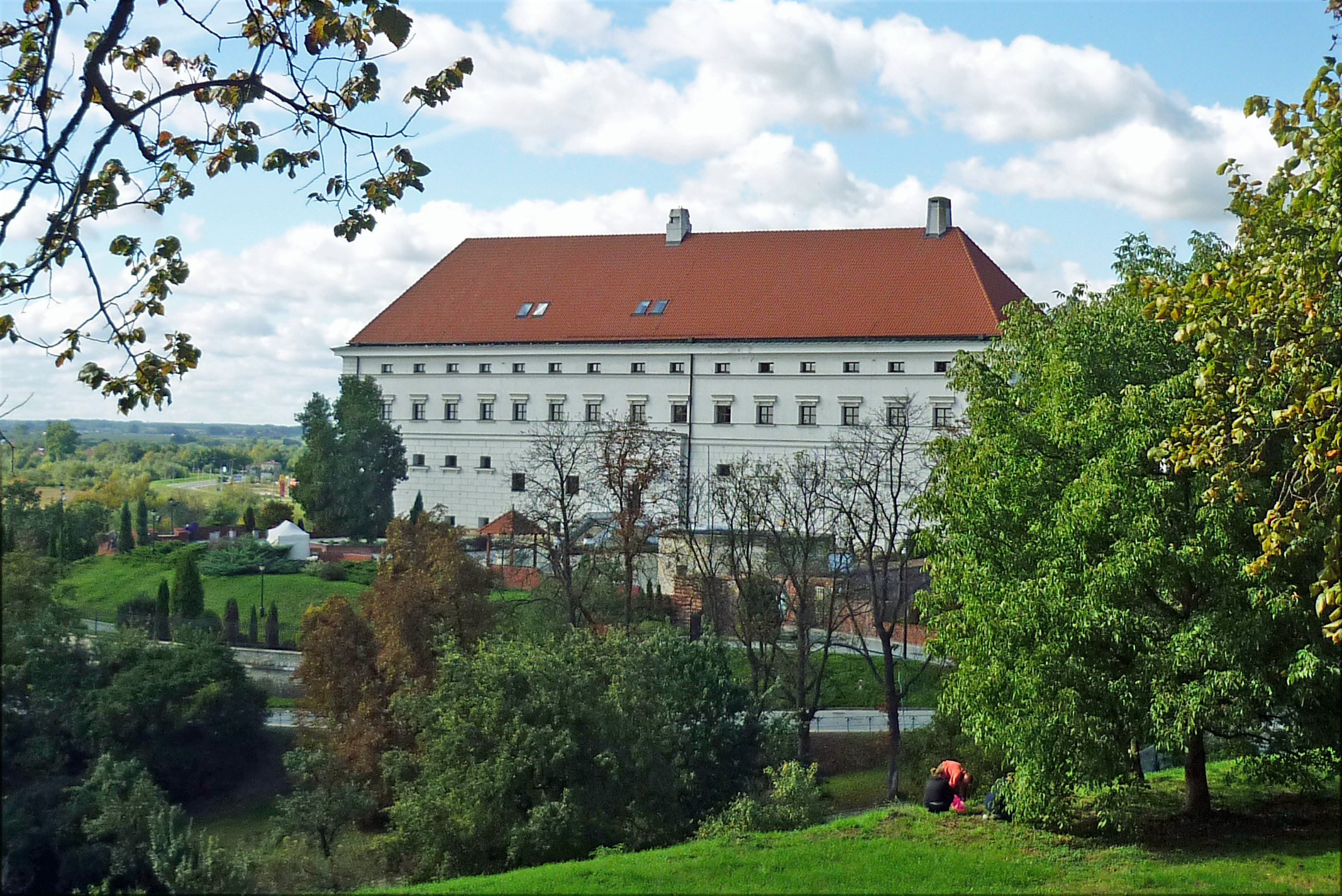
Exterior of the castle

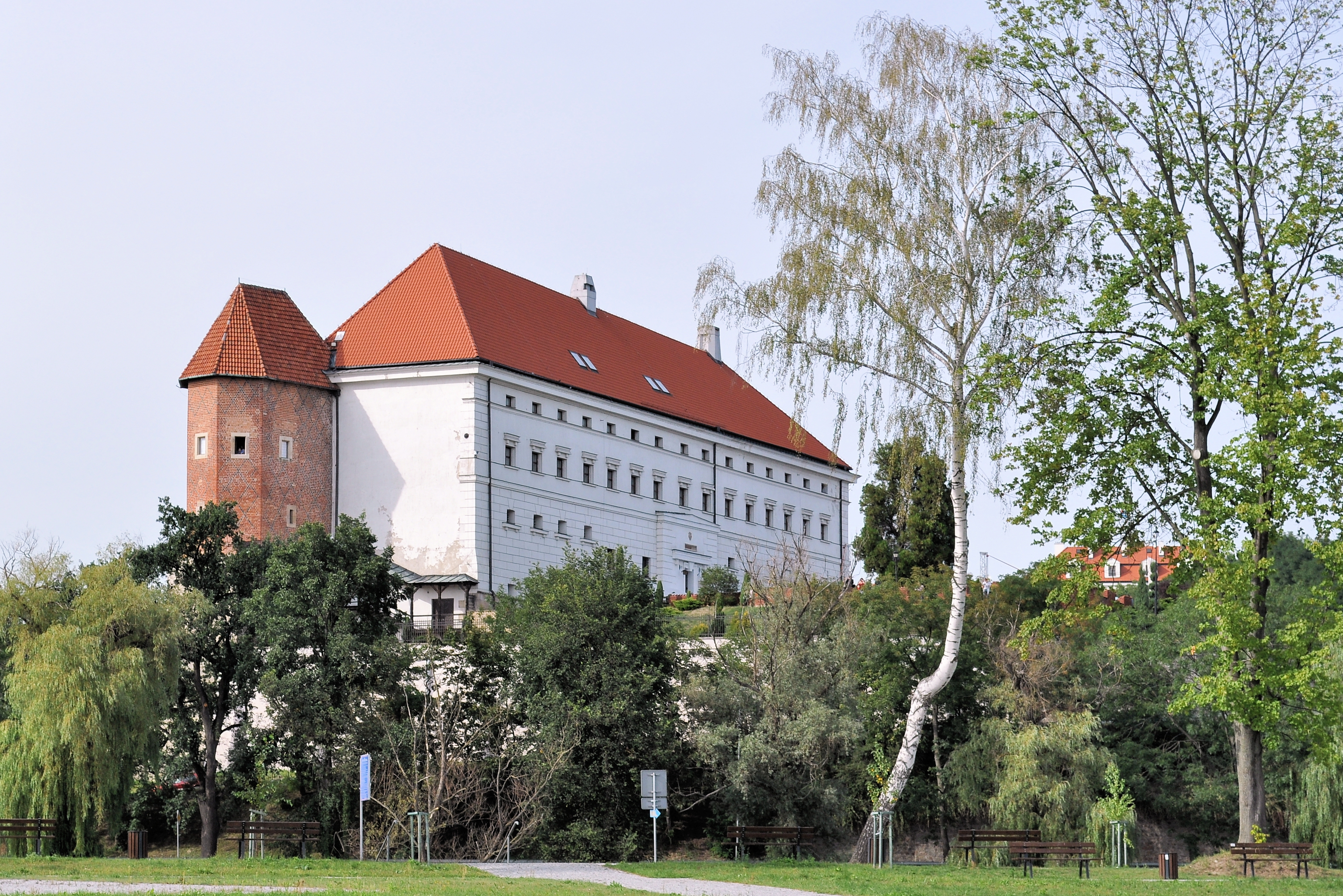
Side view

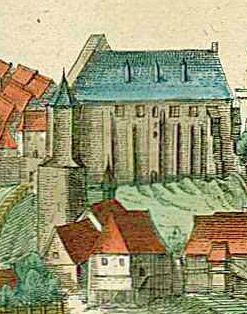
Sandomierz castle in the 15th century, during the reign of Casimir IV Jagiellon

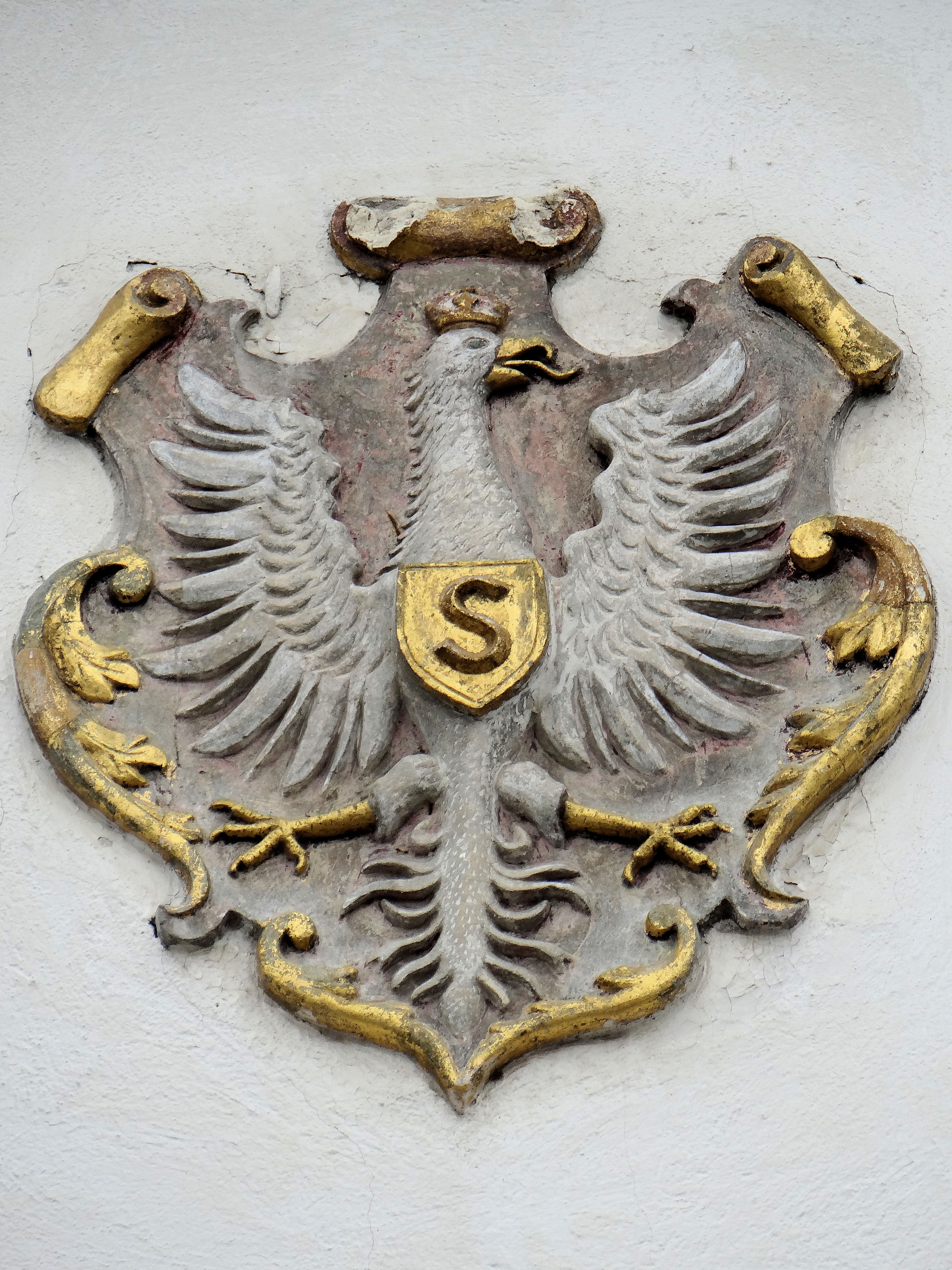
Eagle of Sigismund I the Old on the façade

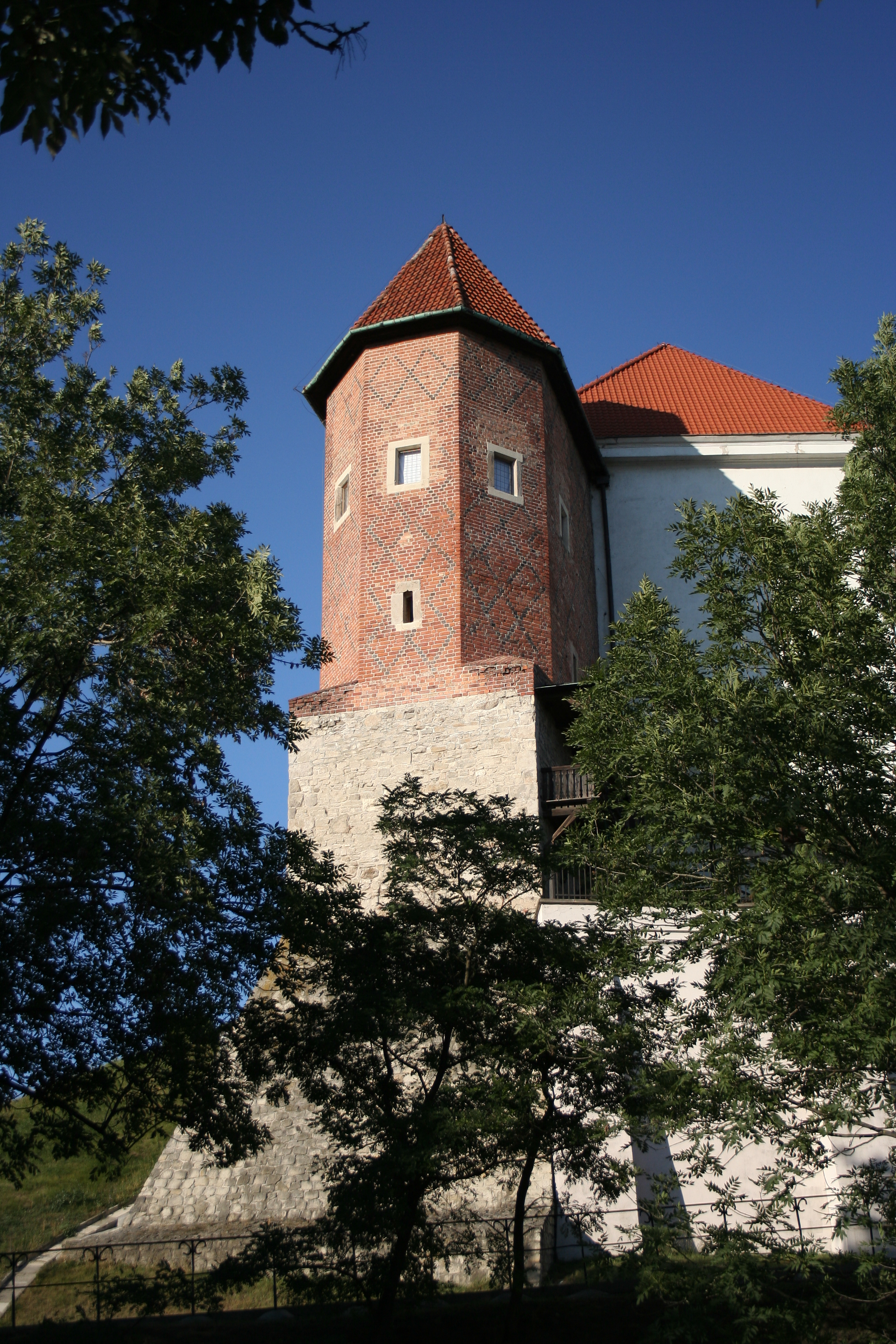
West wing of the castle and the gothic tower known as "Kurza Stopka" (Hen's Foot)

== See also ==
- Castles in Poland
