= Opatów Gate =

Gate in Sandomierz, Poland

- Brama Opatowska
- Sandomierz, Poland
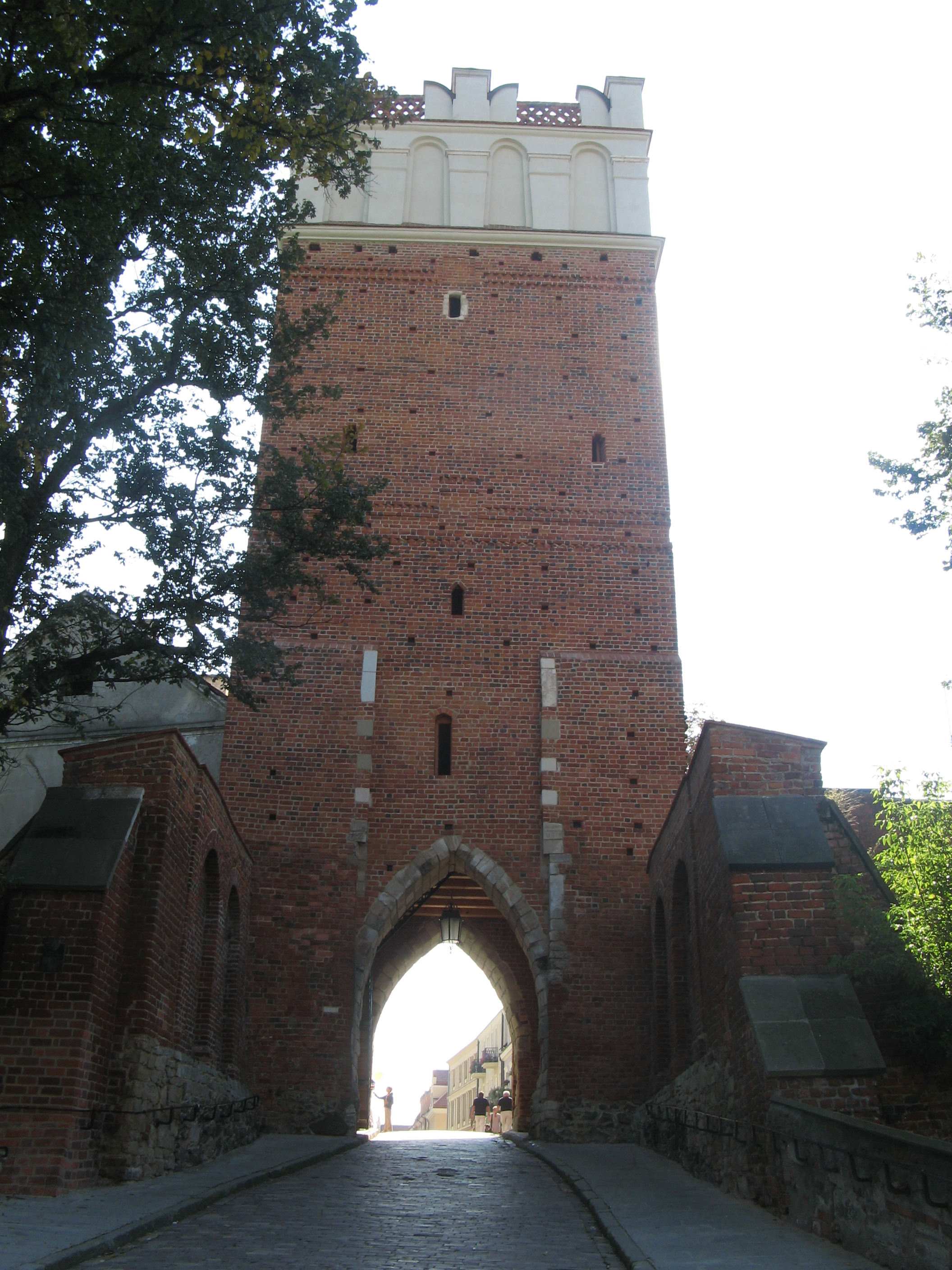

Site information
- Type: Wall

Location
- Coordinates: 50°40′53.5″N 21°44′58″E

Site history
- Built: 14th century
- Designations: Register of monuments

Opatów Gate is a gothic city gate in Sandomierz, Poland. It was built during the Middle Ages and is a registered monument in Poland.

Geographer Mieczysław Orłowicz mentioned it as one of the last remaining elements of the city walls. It is also the only surviving example of the four original city gates. The top of the gate is accessible and provides a view of the city.

== History ==
The gate was built in the 14th century. It is associated with the fortifications build by Casimir the Great.

The battlements were renovated after the completion of the original construction.

In 2015, a court returned the gate to the control of the city after a contract dispute with the Polish Tourist and Sightseeing Society.

== Description ==
In 1900, historian Zygmunt Gloger described the structure as "built of bricks, and the corners are made of ashlar stone, the top is topped with a beautiful balustrade."

== See also ==
- Gothic architecture in modern Poland
- Kraków Gate in Lublin
