= Collegium Gostomianum =

Coordinates: 50°40′38″N 21°45′05″E

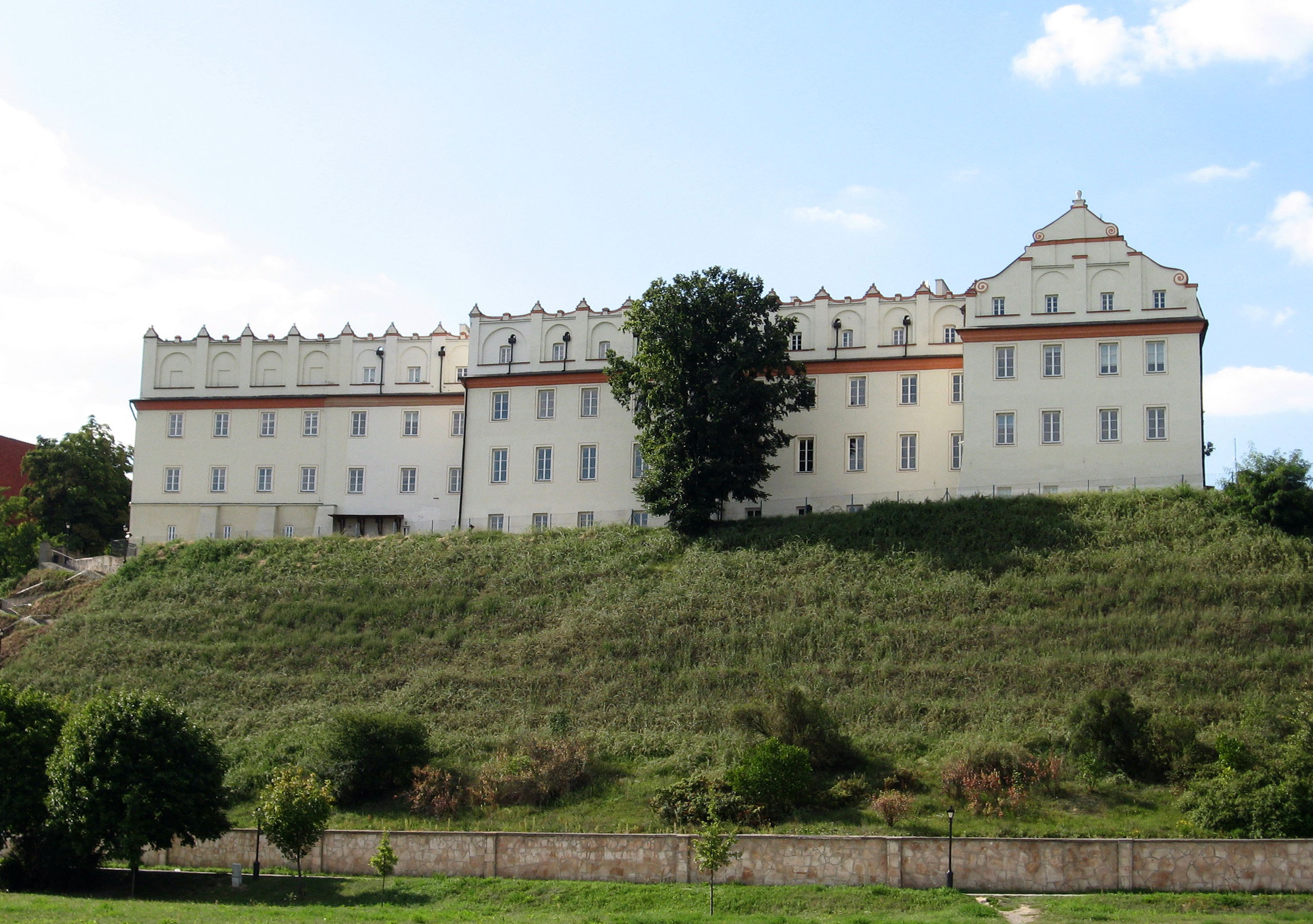
- Interactive map of the Collegium Gostomianum area

General information
- Architectural style: Polish Mannerism
- Location: Sandomierz, Poland
- Construction started: 1604
- Completed: 1615
- Client: Hieronim Gostomski

Design and construction
- Architect: Michał Hintz

Collegium Gostomianum is a secondary school in Sandomierz, Poland. Founded in 1602, it is one of the oldest schools in Poland.

== History ==
The building was established in 1602 by Hieronim Gostomski, voivode of Poznań for the Jesuits. The construction started in 1604 according to design by a Jesuit Michał Hintz and was completed in 1615. At that time two wings were built at the edge of Vistula river and surrounding romanesque St. Peter's Parish Church. The eastern wing was intended to house Jesuit Collegium, named after the founder Gostomianum, and the southern wing housed a monastery.

== See also ==
- List of mannerist structures in Southern Poland
- List of Jesuit sites
