= Sandomierz =

Town in Świętokrzyskie Voivodeship, Poland

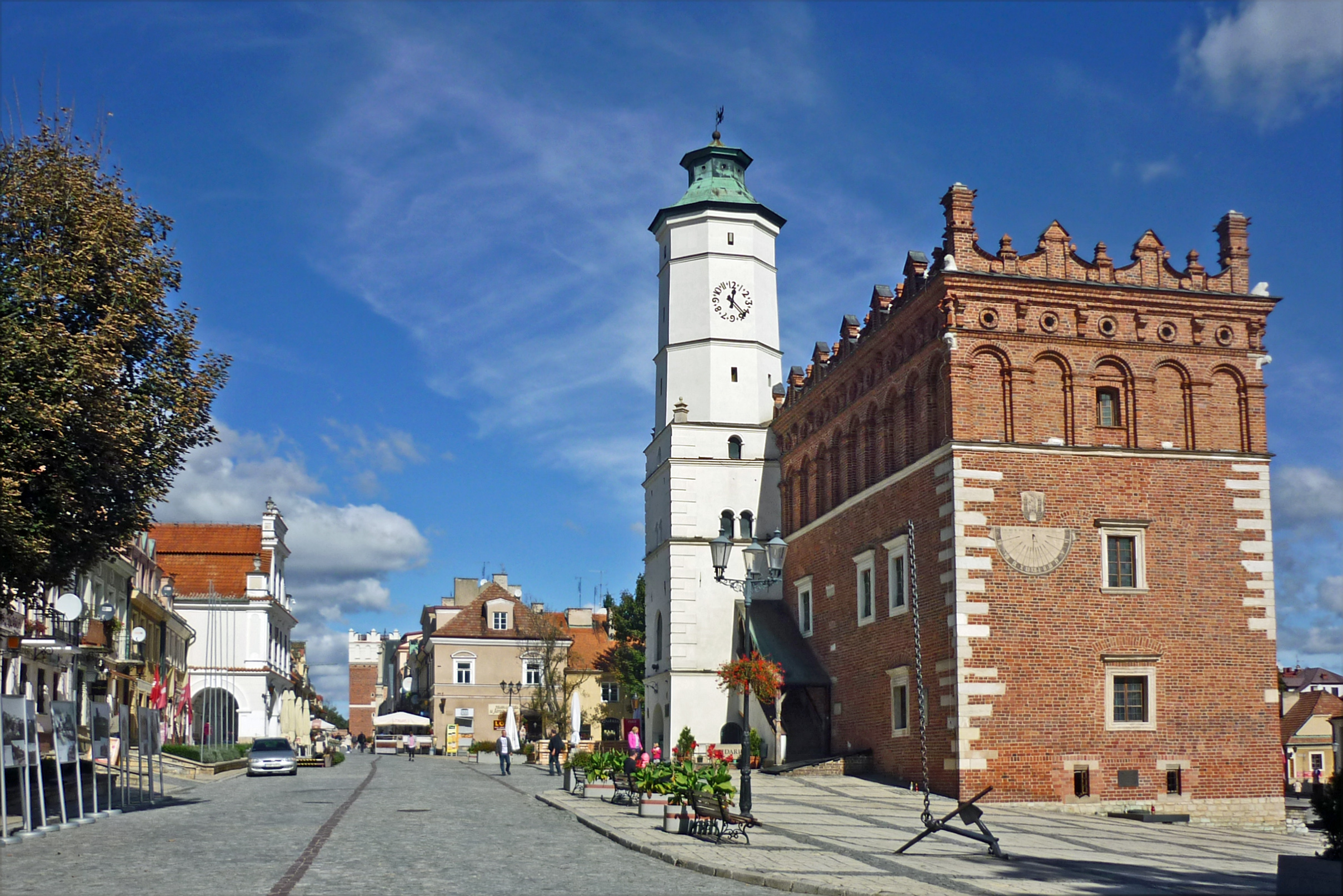
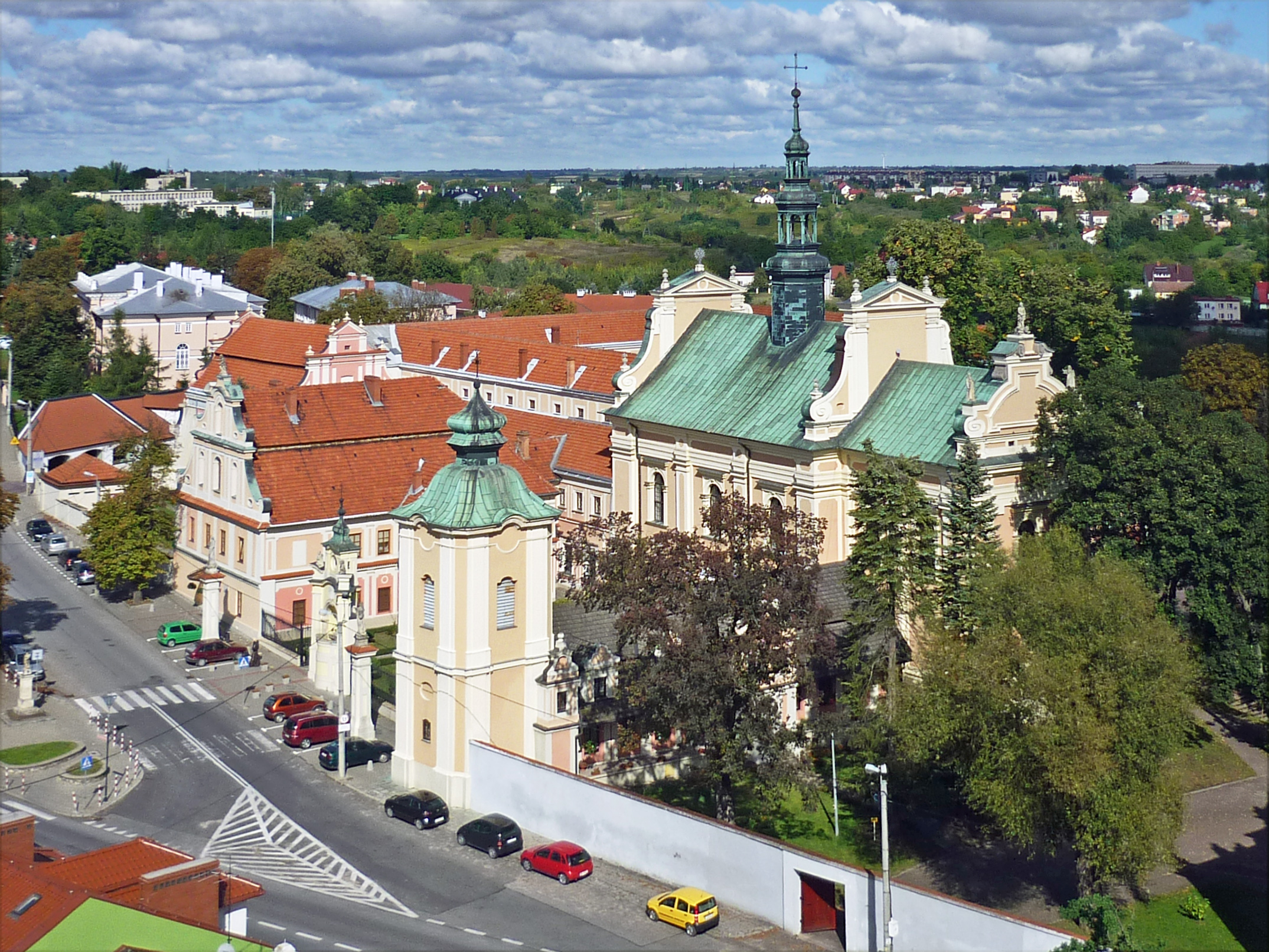
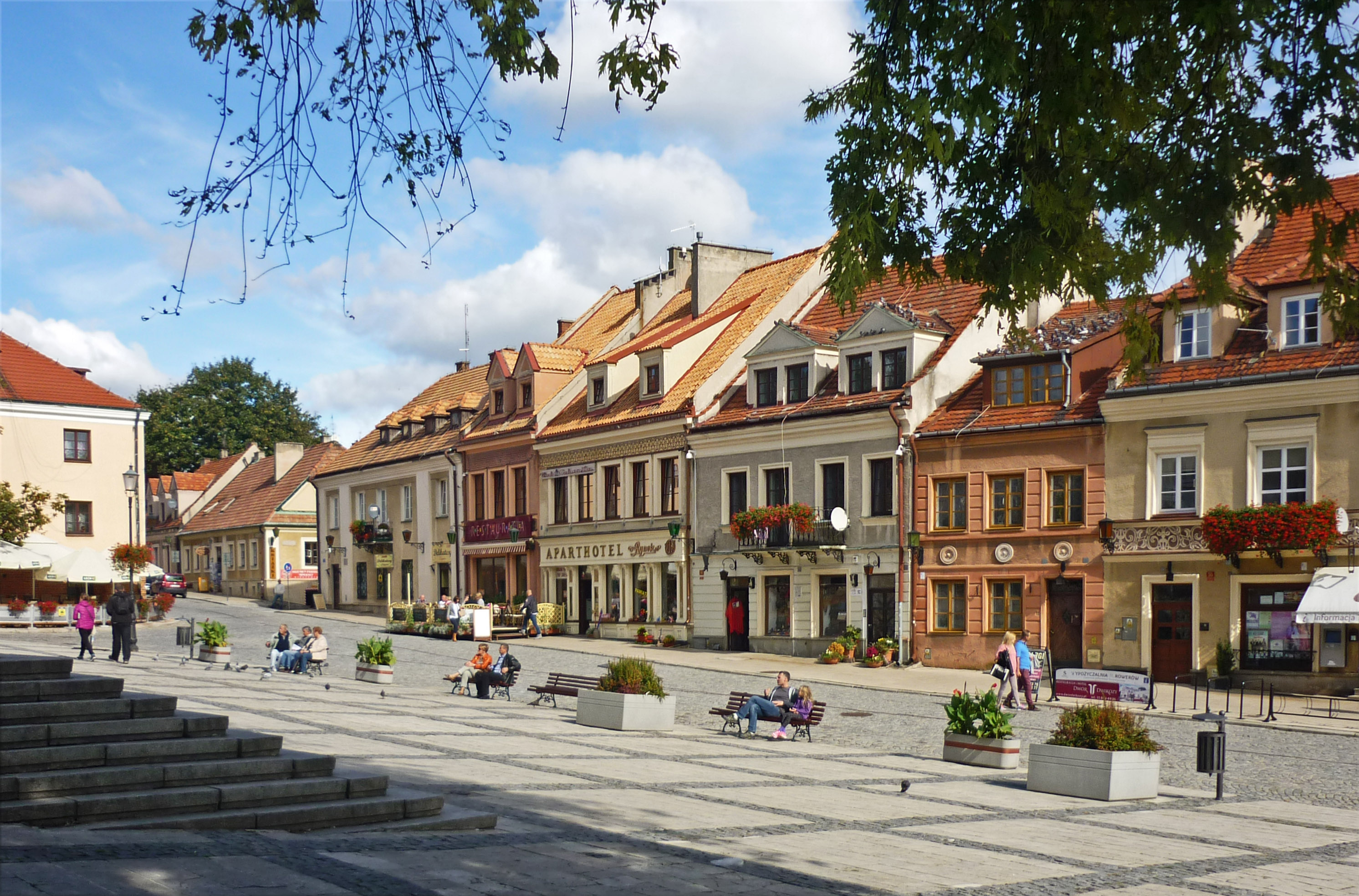
- Town Hall St. Michael's Church Old townhouses at the Market Square

- Flag Coat of arms
- Interactive map of Sandomierz
- Location within Świętokrzyskie Voivodeship Location within Poland
- Coordinates: 50°41′N 21°45′E
- Country: Poland
- Voivodeship: Świętokrzyskie
- County: Sandomierz County
- Gmina: Sandomierz (urban gmina)
- Town rights: before 1227

Government
  - Mayor: Paweł Niedźwiedź (PSL)

Area
  - Total: 28.8 km^{2} (11.1 sq mi)
- Elevation: 200 m (660 ft)

Population (2017)
  - Total: 23,863
  - Density: 829/km^{2} (2,150/sq mi)
- Time zone: UTC+1 (CET)
  - Summer (DST): UTC+2 (CEST)
- Postal code: 27-600
- Area code: +48 15
- Car plates: TSA
- Website: www.sandomierz.pl

Historic Monument of Poland
- Designated: 2017-11-22
- Reference no.: Dz. U. z 2017 r. poz. 2273

Sandomierz (pronounced: [sanˈdɔmjɛʂ]; Latin: Sandomiria, Yiddish: צויזמר, צוזמיר, romanized: Tsouzmer, Tsoyzmer) is a historic town in south-eastern Poland with 23,863 inhabitants (as of 2017), situated on the Vistula River near its confluence with the San, in the Sandomierz Basin. It is the capital of Sandomierz County within the Świętokrzyskie Voivodeship. Sandomierz is known for its preserved Old Town, a major cultural and tourist attraction which the President of Poland declared a National Monument of Poland in 2017.

In the past, Sandomierz was one of the most important urban centers not only of Lesser Poland, but also of the whole country. It was a royal city of the Polish Crown and functioned as a regional administrative centre from the High Middle Ages to the 19th century.

== Etymology ==
The name of the city might have originated from the Old Polish Sędomir, composed of Sędzi- (from the verb sądzić "to judge") and mir ("peace"), or more likely from the antiquated given name Sędzimir, once popular in several Slavic languages. Sandomierz is known in Latin as Sandomiria and in Yiddish as צויזמיר (Tzoyzmir). Sandor is short form of Aleksander. “Mierz” means measure in Polish language. In conclusion this land is named Sandor’s measure, or Sandor’s Land.

== History ==
=== Early history ===
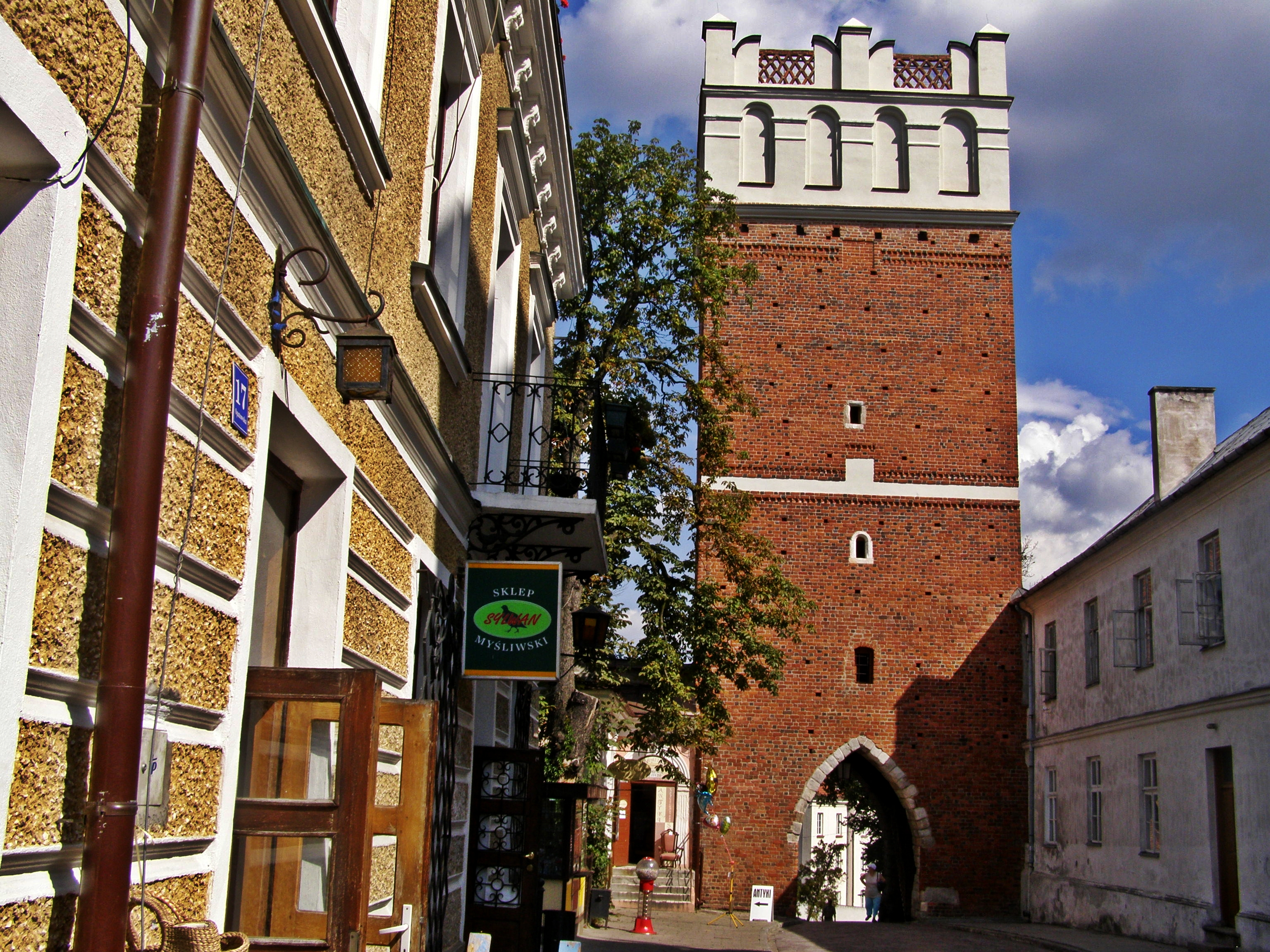
Opatów Gate

Sandomierz is one of the oldest and historically most significant cities in Poland. Archaeological finds around the city indicate that humans have inhabited the area since Neolithic times. The city came into existence in the early Middle Ages, taking advantage of an excellent location at the junction of Vistula and San rivers, and on the path of important trade routes. The first known historical mention of the city comes from the early 12th century, when the chronicler Gallus Anonymus ranked it together with Kraków and Wrocław as one of the main cities of Poland. The testament (c. 1115–1118) of Bolesław III Wrymouth, in which he divided Poland among his sons, designated Sandomierz as the capital of one of the resulting principalities, the Duchy of Sandomierz.

In the early 13th century, the second oldest Dominican monastery in Poland (after Kraków) and one of the oldest in Europe was founded in Sandomierz. In the course of the 13th century the city suffered grievous damage during the raids by Mongols in 1241, 1260 and 1287. The old wooden buildings of the town were completely destroyed. As a result, in 1286 the High Duke of Poland Leszek II the Black, effectively refounded the city under Magdeburg Law and granted staple right. The city archives preserve the founding document. (An important note: in 1260, as the Tartars invaded Christian Sandomir, a community of Dominicans was praying Matins while a novice read the martyrology for the next day: "the 49 martyrs of Sandomir". When the friars realized they were being warned of their death, they spent the remainder of the night and all the next day preparing to meet the Lord. At last, after the brethren had finished praying Compline, and as they processed singing the Salve Regina to Mary, the Tartars broke through the church door. While the Tartars intended to bring death to these Dominicans, they actually brought them great gifts - crowns of martyrdom. Ever since, at the death of every Dominican a song to his Beloved Mother is sung to usher him into her arms - the Salve Regina (or Hail, Holy Queen).

After the re-unification of the Polish lands in the 14th century, the former principality became the Sandomierz Voivodeship, incorporating large areas of southeastern Poland. Until 1474, it was one of two voivodeships (administrative area/province) of Lesser Poland, together with Kraków Voivodeship. In 1474, Lublin Voivodeship was created from eastern part of Sandomierz Voivodeship. At this time Sandomierz had about 3,000 inhabitants and was one of the largest Polish cities. In the middle of the 14th century the city was burned again during a raid by the Lithuanians. It was rebuilt during the rule of king Casimir III of Poland, who extended its privileges. The layout of the city has survived practically unchanged since that time until the present day. In 1389, Lithuanian prince Lengvenis paid homage to Polish king Władysław II Jagiełło.

=== Modern era ===
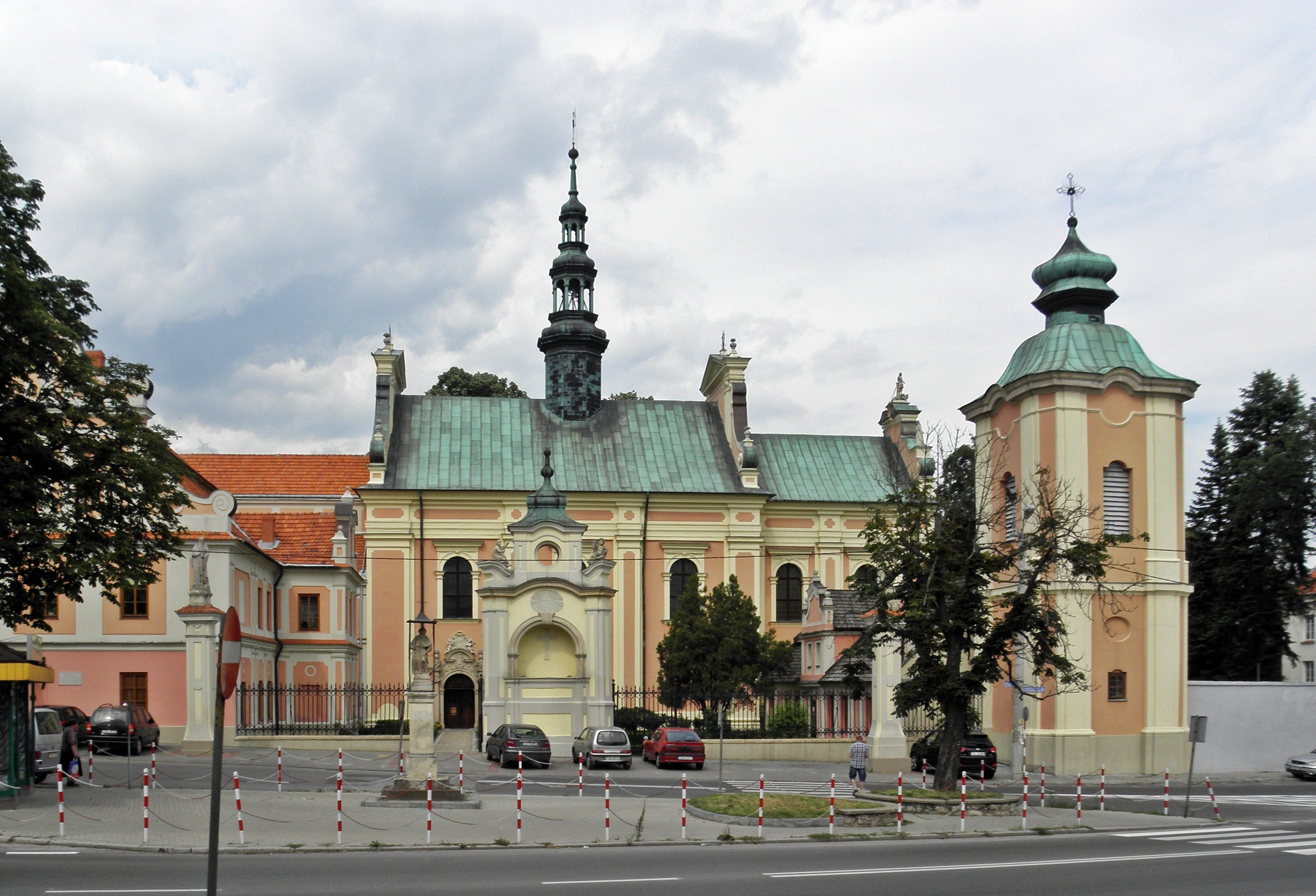
Saint Michael the Archangel's Church

Over centuries, Sandomierz was in competition with the nearby town of Opatòw for the seat of regional administrations. In 1570 an alliance of non-Catholic Polish Churches, the Lutherans, the Reformed, and the Bohemian Brethren, drew up what is known as the Sandomierz Agreement, effecting a confederation of the work in order to stave off defeat at the hands of the Roman Church. Thanks to the efforts of the local starost Hieronim Gostomski, the Jesuits settled in the city and founded the Collegium Gostomianum, one Poland's oldest high schools, at the beginning of the 17th century.

The early modern period, running until the middle of the 17th century, was quite prosperous for the city. The most important historical buildings were built during this period. This golden age came to an end in 1655 when Swedish forces captured the city in the course of the Deluge. After briefly holding out in the city, the withdrawing Swedes blew up the castle and caused heavy damage to other buildings. In the next 100 years the economy of Poland suffered a decline, which also affected the city. A great fire in 1757 and the Third Partition of Poland in 1795, which placed Sandomierz in Austria, further reduced its status. As a result, Sandomierz lost its role as an administrative capital. In 1774, the oldest extant Polish piano was constructed in Sandomierz. The 3rd Polish National Cavalry Brigade was stationed in Sandomierz in 1792.

Fighting of the Austro-Polish War of 1809 caused damage to the city. Following the Polish victory, it became part of the short-lived Polish Duchy of Warsaw and after 1815 it found itself in Congress Poland. At this point the city had just 2640 inhabitants.

==== Sandomierz Cathedral and St Paul's Church blood painting ====
This cathedral contains a series of paintings built into the church's wooden panelling depicting the Martyrologium Romanum. The third painting shows the scene which, it is claimed: "...depicts ritual murders committed in Sandomierz by Jews on Christian children. The inscription above the painting reads filius apothecary ab infidelibus judaeis sandomiriensibus occisus (son of an apothecary, by infidel Sandomierz Jews killed)

The St Paul's Church contains a different series of paintings including one in the chancel, depicting the torment of Jerzy Krassowski who was allegedly strangled by the Jews. Discussion on these pictures has taken place with the participation of the Polish Jewish Community."The Polish Council of Christians and Jews has offered to finance a plaque with explanations of the painting and information about the official statements by various Popes". This plaque is now displayed in the St Paul's Church next to the picture in question.

=== The world wars ===
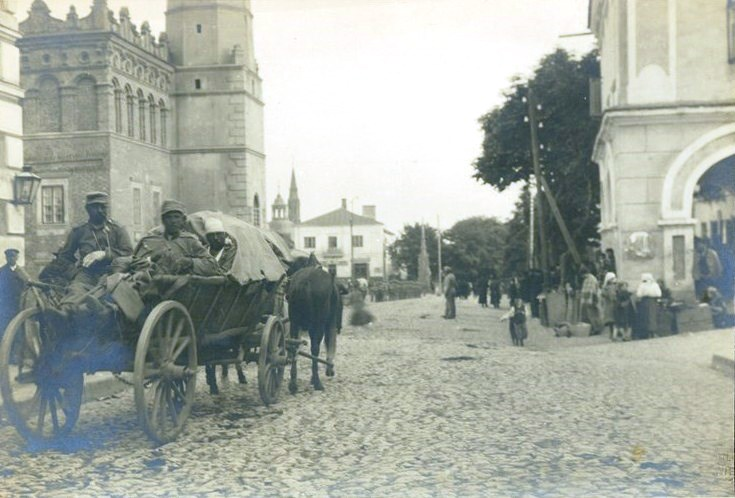
1914. Wounded in action Austro-Hungarian soldiers in Sandomierz during World War I

The city again suffered damage during World War I. In 1918, it again became part of independent Poland. In the 1930s, due to the massive public works project known as the Central Industrial Area, Sandomierz began to grow quickly. It was projected to become capital of the Sandomierz Voivodeship, and local authorities planned fast development of the city. The Greater Sandomierz was to turn in the 1940s into a city of 120,000.

In September 1939, following the German invasion of Poland, the city was occupied by Germany and made part of the General Government. The Polish and Jewish population were subjected to various crimes. Poles who were expelled by the Germans from annexed Złoczew in late 1939 were deported to Sandomierz. Others were conscripted for forced labour and many were sent to labor camps. The largest mass arrests of Poles, including teachers, local officials and activists, were carried out in March 1940. Poles were then held in the local prison and deported to Nazi concentration camps. Mayor of Sandomierz Wiktor Jesipowicz was murdered by the Russians in Kharkiv in the Katyn massacre in 1940. In June 1940 in Brzask Forest, Germans murdered 760 Poles as part of the German AB-Aktion in Poland directed to exterminate Polish intelligentsia. Bodies were buried in an unnamed mass grave. That was the largest massacre in the Kielce Region. At the same time, the nearby village of Góry Wysokie was the site a massacre of 117 Poles from the region. Despite this, the Polish underground resistance movement was active in Sandomierz, and in late 1940 it even launched a secret printing house in Sandomierz and issued the Polish underground newspaper Odwet, which was also distributed to nearby villages. In March 1942, the Germans carried out mass arrests of around 150 members of the Polish resistance. Among those arrested was local Polish writer Roman Koseła, one of several Polish writers murdered in the Auschwitz concentration camp.

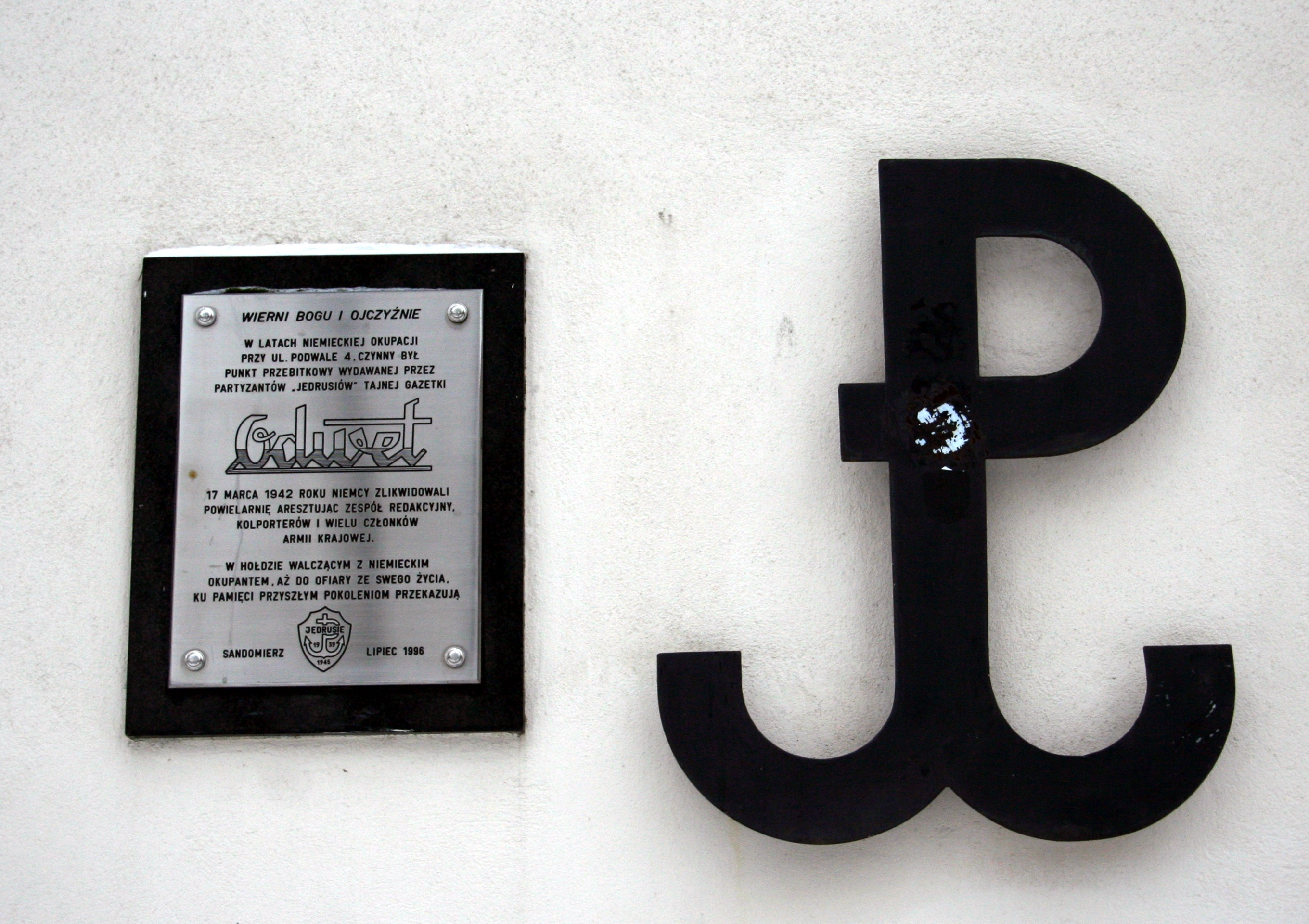
Memorial plaque at the site of the former secret printing house of the Polish resistance movement

In May 1942, the Jewish population was confined to a ghetto area and hundreds of Jews from around the region were brought there, increasing the population to more than 5000. In October 1942, about 3,000 prisoners were sent to Bełżec where they were immediately gassed. After that deportation, hundreds of Jews came out of hiding and others were sent to Sandomierz from elsewhere. Now the population was more than 6000 confined to another ghetto where as many as twelve people shared each room and some lived in the streets. Sanitary conditions were horrid and many became ill. Those who reported to the hospital were usually shot after a few days. Some prisoners during this time were sent to labor camps, but in January 1943, the SS and German police, surrounded the ghetto, set some houses on fire and bombed others. They rounded up 7,000 people, send a few hundred to a labor camp, and escorted the rest to the railway station, shooting hundreds en route. The trains took the prisoners to Treblinka where they were murdered by gas the same day. Poles were persecuted for helping Jews, some were even imprisoned for barely "transporting Jews illegally".

The city was captured by the Red Army in August 1944. Unlike many Polish cities, it managed to avoid destruction; the merit of protecting the city is attributed to the military skill of the Soviet Lieutenant Colonel Vasyl Skopenko, who led the operation. His grave with a monument was located near the Opatowska Gate, but in 1990, by the decision of Mayor Tomasz Panfil, it was moved to the Soviet military cemetery on Mickiewicz Street; this was one of the first public acts of decommunization in Poland.

No major industrial development took place in Sandomierz during the communist era, thus preserving its look of a charming, small city full of historical monuments among the unspoiled landscape.

== Climate ==
The city experiences a humid continental climate with notably warm summers (Köppen: Dfb), much more consistently pronounced in eastern Poland. Precipitation, especially in the form of rains, is concentrated in the summer, reducing until the end of winter. Sandomierz has four well defined seasons of the year, hot summers (sometimes), usually bearable and cold winters but with slightly moderate extremes.

Climate data for Sandomierz (Chwałki), elevation: 217 m, 1991-2020 normals, extremes 1951–present
Month	Jan	Feb	Mar	Apr	May	Jun	Jul	Aug	Sep	Oct	Nov	Dec	Year
Record high °C (°F)	13.3 (55.9)	18.7 (65.7)	23.6 (74.5)	29.7 (85.5)	31.9 (89.4)	34.2 (93.6)	35.9 (96.6)	37.1 (98.8)	33.9 (93.0)	25.4 (77.7)	20.0 (68.0)	16.0 (60.8)	37.1 (98.8)
Mean daily maximum °C (°F)	0.6 (33.1)	2.6 (36.7)	7.5 (45.5)	14.6 (58.3)	19.7 (67.5)	23.0 (73.4)	25.0 (77.0)	24.7 (76.5)	19.1 (66.4)	13.0 (55.4)	6.8 (44.2)	1.7 (35.1)	13.2 (55.8)
Daily mean °C (°F)	−2.1 (28.2)	−0.7 (30.7)	3.2 (37.8)	9.3 (48.7)	14.2 (57.6)	17.6 (63.7)	19.5 (67.1)	19.0 (66.2)	14.0 (57.2)	8.6 (47.5)	3.6 (38.5)	−0.7 (30.7)	8.8 (47.8)
Mean daily minimum °C (°F)	−4.5 (23.9)	−3.6 (25.5)	−0.4 (31.3)	4.5 (40.1)	9.2 (48.6)	12.6 (54.7)	14.4 (57.9)	13.9 (57.0)	9.6 (49.3)	5.0 (41.0)	1.1 (34.0)	−3.0 (26.6)	4.9 (40.8)
Record low °C (°F)	−27.3 (−17.1)	−28.6 (−19.5)	−22.1 (−7.8)	−7.0 (19.4)	−1.9 (28.6)	0.2 (32.4)	5.4 (41.7)	3.8 (38.8)	−2.3 (27.9)	−7.4 (18.7)	−18.0 (−0.4)	−26.4 (−15.5)	−28.6 (−19.5)
Average precipitation mm (inches)	24.3 (0.96)	20.9 (0.82)	30.8 (1.21)	40.5 (1.59)	67.3 (2.65)	63.0 (2.48)	90.3 (3.56)	55.7 (2.19)	58.4 (2.30)	46.2 (1.82)	29.4 (1.16)	24.4 (0.96)	551.3 (21.70)
Average extreme snow depth cm (inches)	7.3 (2.9)	8.0 (3.1)	4.9 (1.9)	1.5 (0.6)	0.0 (0.0)	0.0 (0.0)	0.0 (0.0)	0.0 (0.0)	0.0 (0.0)	1.0 (0.4)	3.6 (1.4)	4.8 (1.9)	8.0 (3.1)
Average precipitation days (≥ 0.1 mm)	15.50	13.44	13.97	12.33	13.73	13.23	14.00	11.03	11.57	13.48	13.97	15.13	161.39
Average snowy days (≥ 0 cm)	17.5	16.9	7.6	1.4	0.0	0.0	0.0	0.0	0.0	0.7	4.9	14.3	63.3
Average relative humidity (%)	87.2	83.9	76.3	68.6	71.0	72.7	73.0	73.1	79.6	84.3	88.5	89.1	79.0
Mean monthly sunshine hours	55.7	70.9	130.6	184.4	243.4	255.3	255.6	248.4	168.1	117.1	55.9	42.0	1,827.2
Source 1: Institute of Meteorology and Water Management
Source 2: Meteomodel.pl (records, relative humidity 1991–2020)

== Points of interest ==
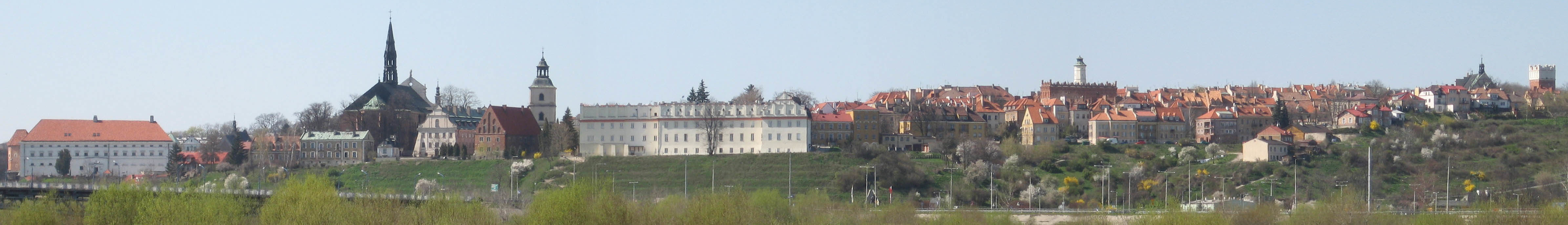
Panorama of Sandomierz, landmarks seen from the left: Royal Castle, Cathedral Basilica, Jan Długosz House, cathedral bell tower, Collegium Gostomianum, Old Town with the town hall in the middle and the Opatów Gate on the right end

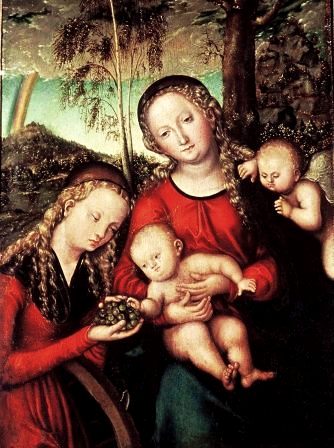
Virgin and Child with Saint Catherine of Alexandria, (1518-1520) by Lucas Cranach the Elder in the Diocesan Museum

- Church of the Holy Spirit in Sandomierz
- Church of St. Jacob where Lesser Polish Way begins
- Sandomierz Church of St. Joseph
- Sandomierz Church of St. Michael
- Sandomierz Church of St. Paul
- Collegium Gostomianum, one of the oldest schools in Poland founded in 1602
- Jan Długosz House
- Kamienica Oleśnickich (Oleśnicki Manor)
- Pepper Mountains nature reserve
- Diocesan Museum in Sandomierz
- Opatowska Gate (Brama Opatowska), Gothic entrance to the city founded by King Casimir (Kazimierz Wielki)
- Sandomierz Castle, medieval structure built on a slope of Vistula River by Casimir III the Great, portrayed in the opera Boris Godunov by Modest Musorgsky
- Sandomierz Cathedral, constructed in 1360 and renovated in the Baroque style in the 18th century
- Sandomierz Main Market Square
- Sandomierz Palace also known as the Bishop's Palace in Sandomierz
- Sandomierz Synagogue, built in 1768 of brick in the Polish Baroque style
- Sandomierz Town Hall

== Education ==
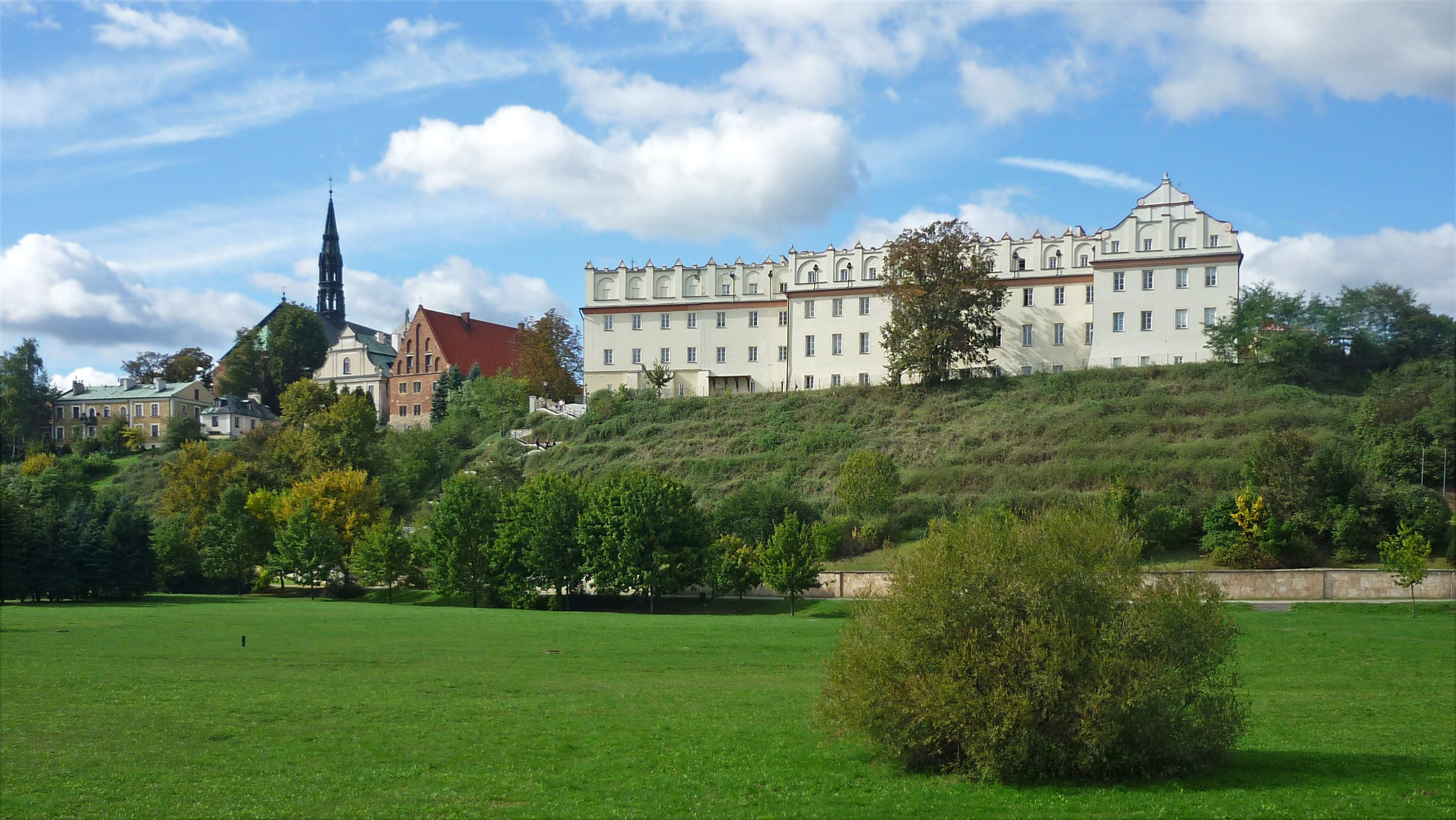
Collegium Gostomianum, one of the oldest schools in Poland

- Wyższa Szkoła Humanistyczno-Przyrodnicza Studium Generale Sandomiriense
- Wyższe Seminarium Duchowne w Sandomierzu
- 1 Liceum Ogolnoksztalcace Collegium Gostomianum
- 2 Liceum Ogólnokształcące im. Tadeusza Kościuszki
- Zespół Szkół Gastronomicznych i Hotelarskich
- Zespół Szkół Technicznych i Ogólnokształcących

== Sports ==
The local football team is Wisła Sandomierz. It competes in the lower leagues.

== International relations ==
=== Twin towns — Sister cities ===
Sandomierz is twinned with:

- Ostroh, Ukraine
- Volterra, Italy
- Newark-on-Trent, United Kingdom
- Emmendingen, Germany

== Gallery ==
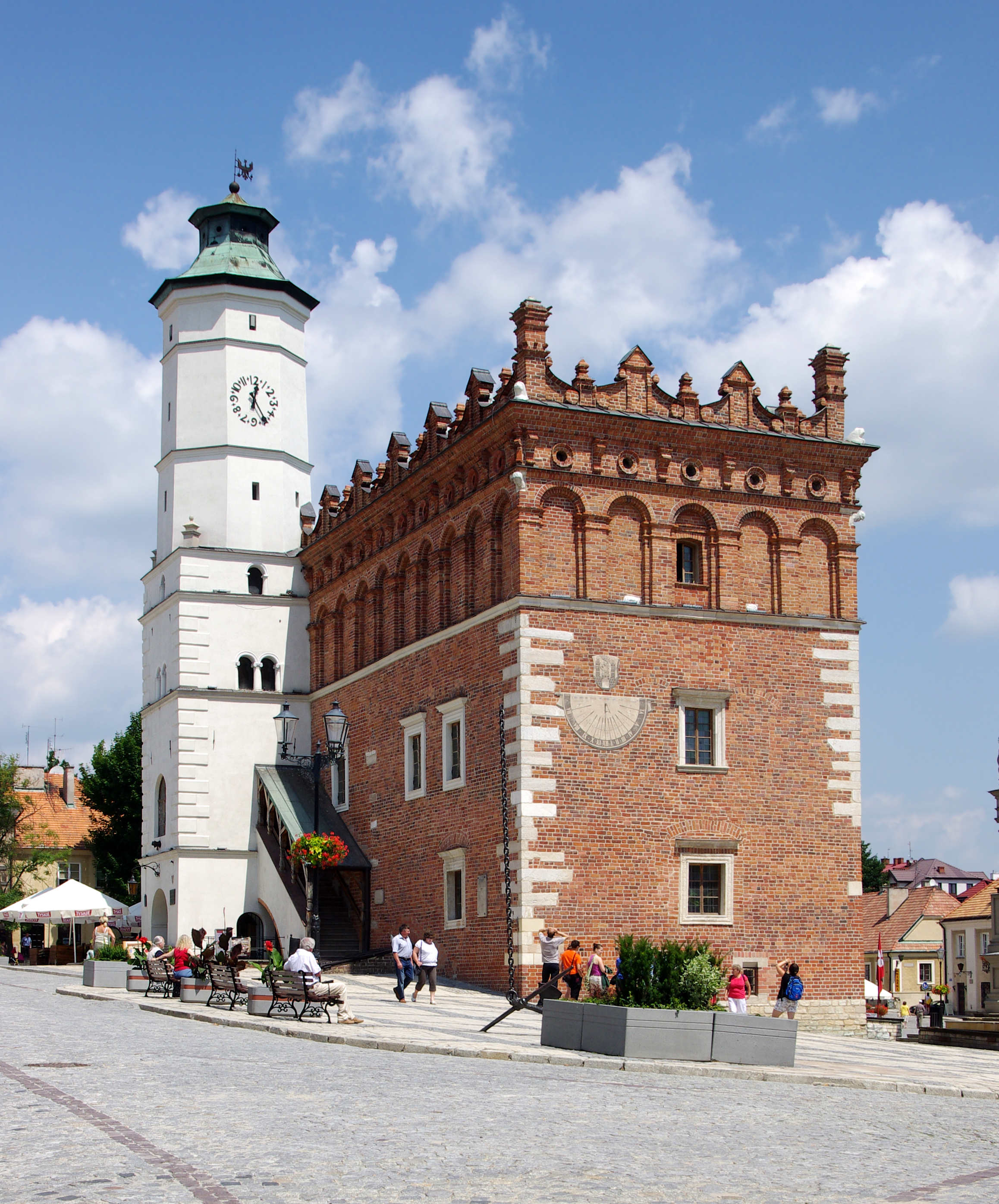
Town Hall

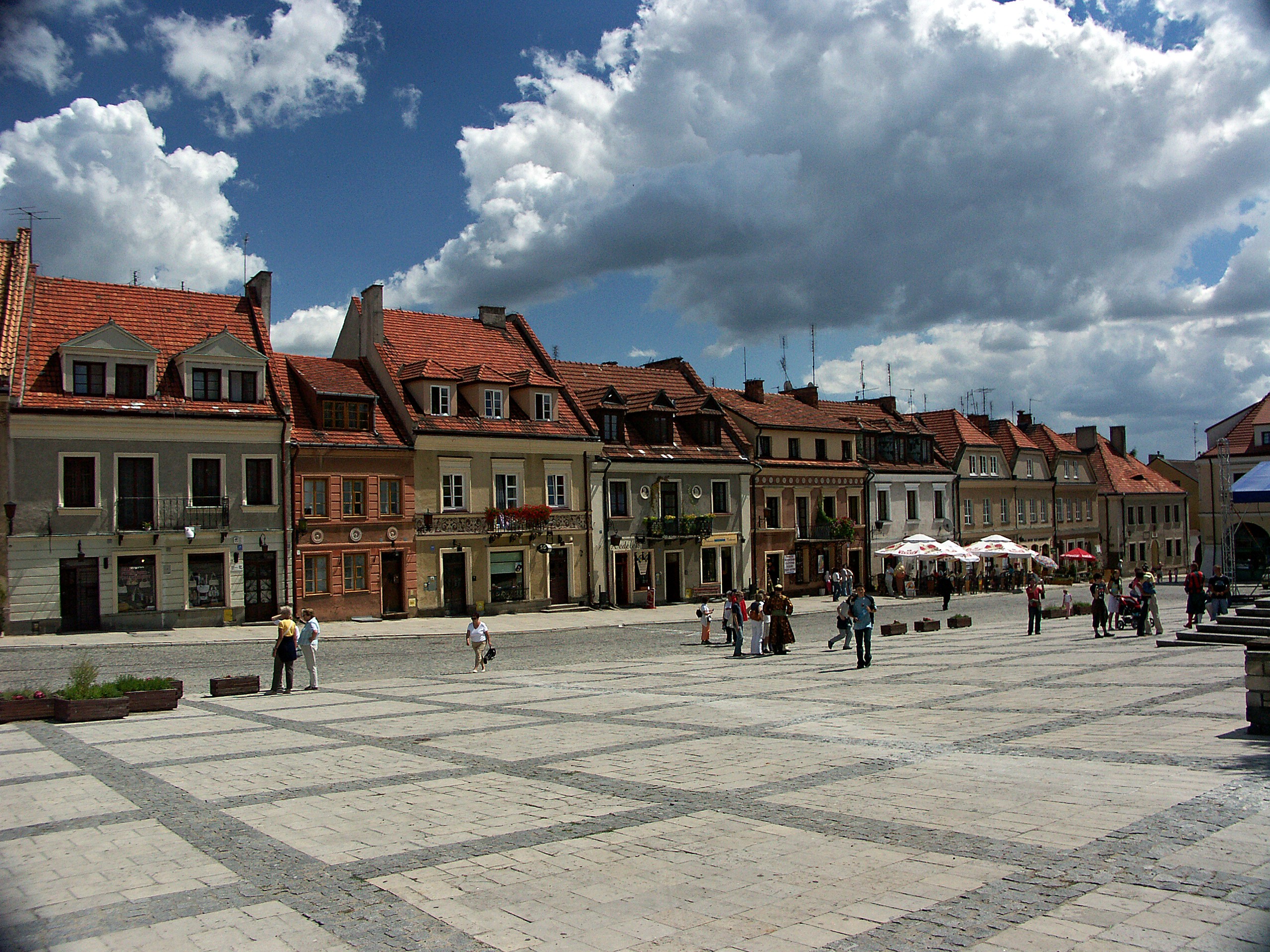
Market Square (Rynek)

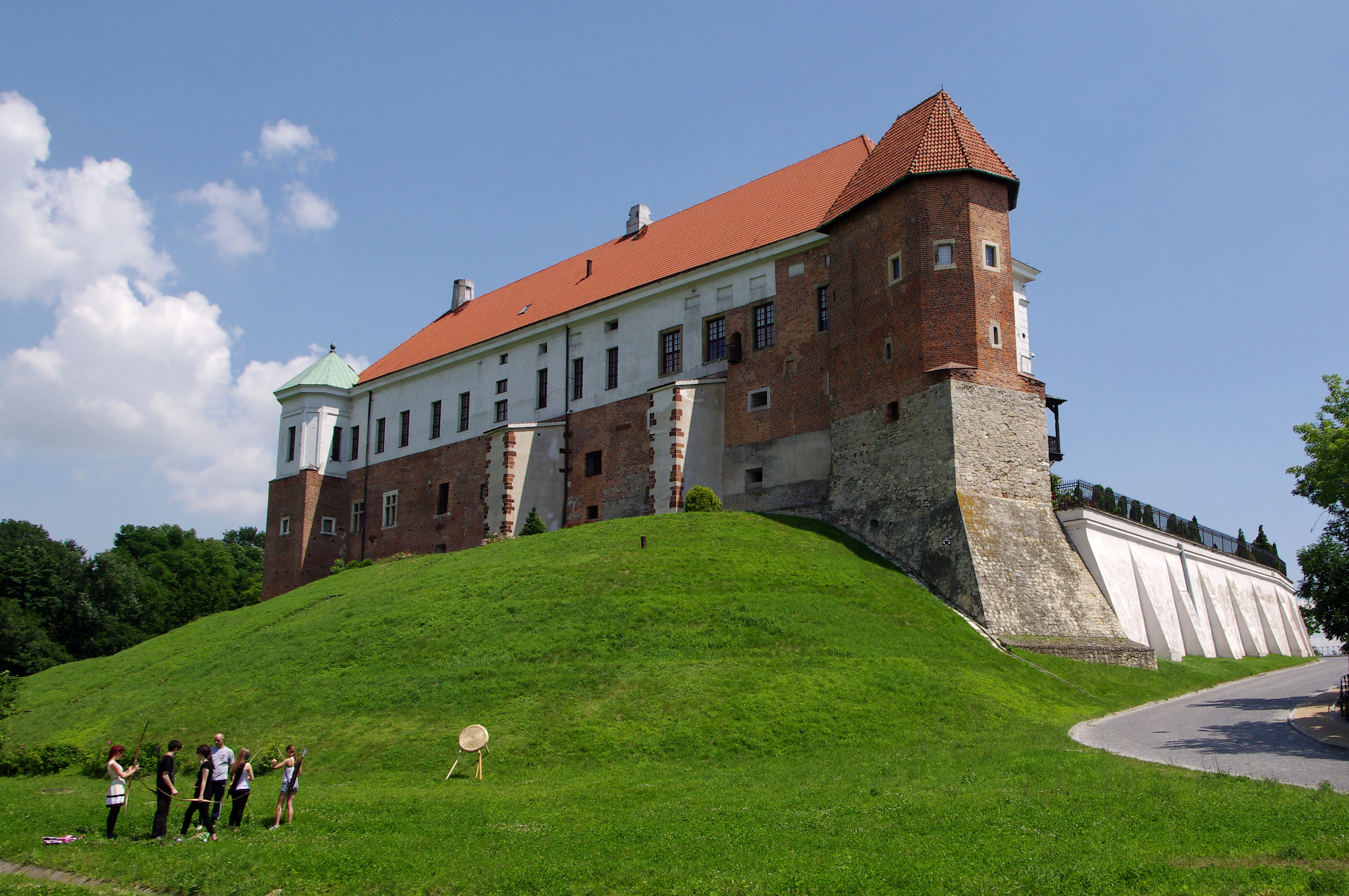
Sandomierz Royal Castle

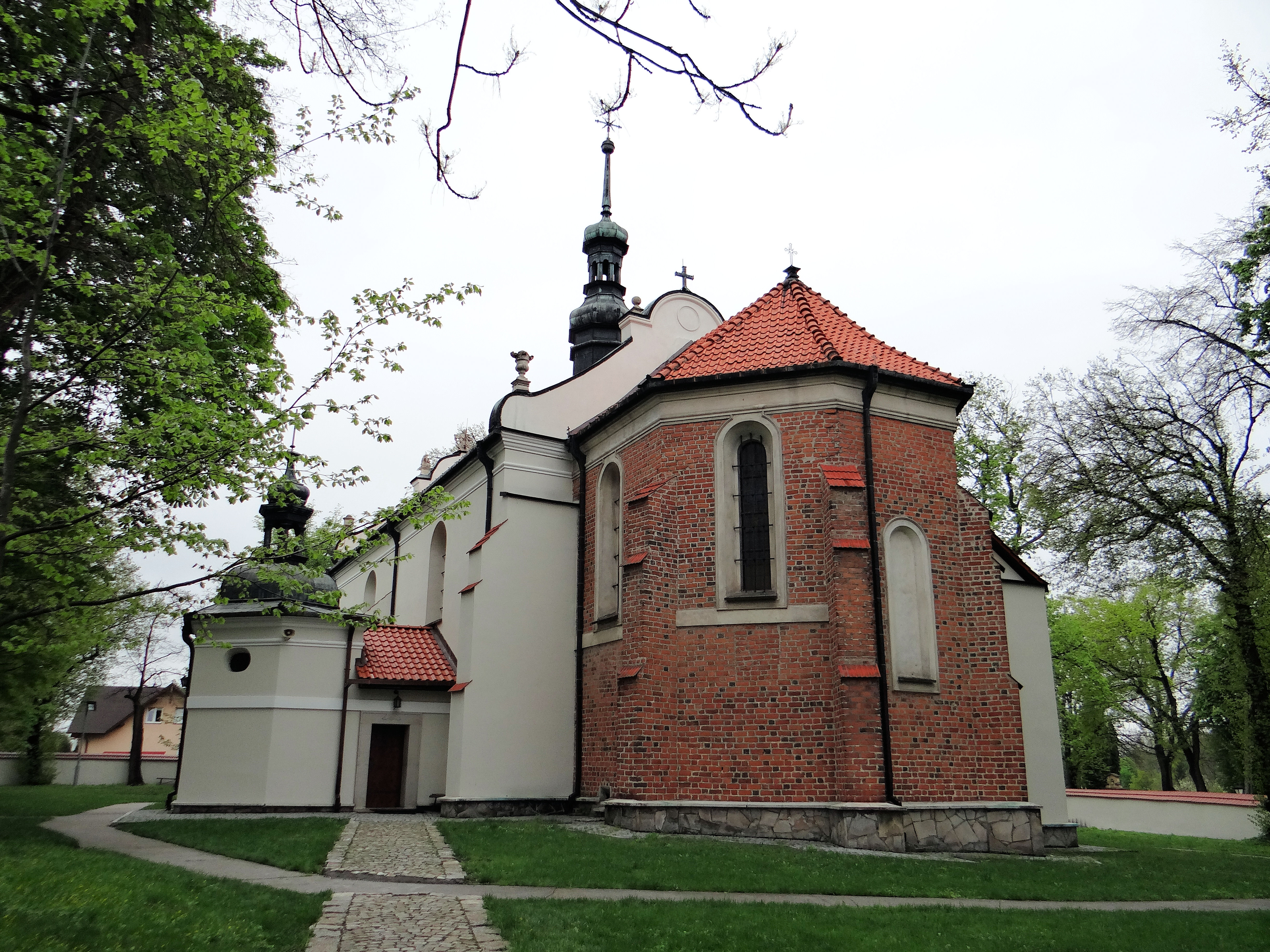
Church of the Conversion of Saint Paul

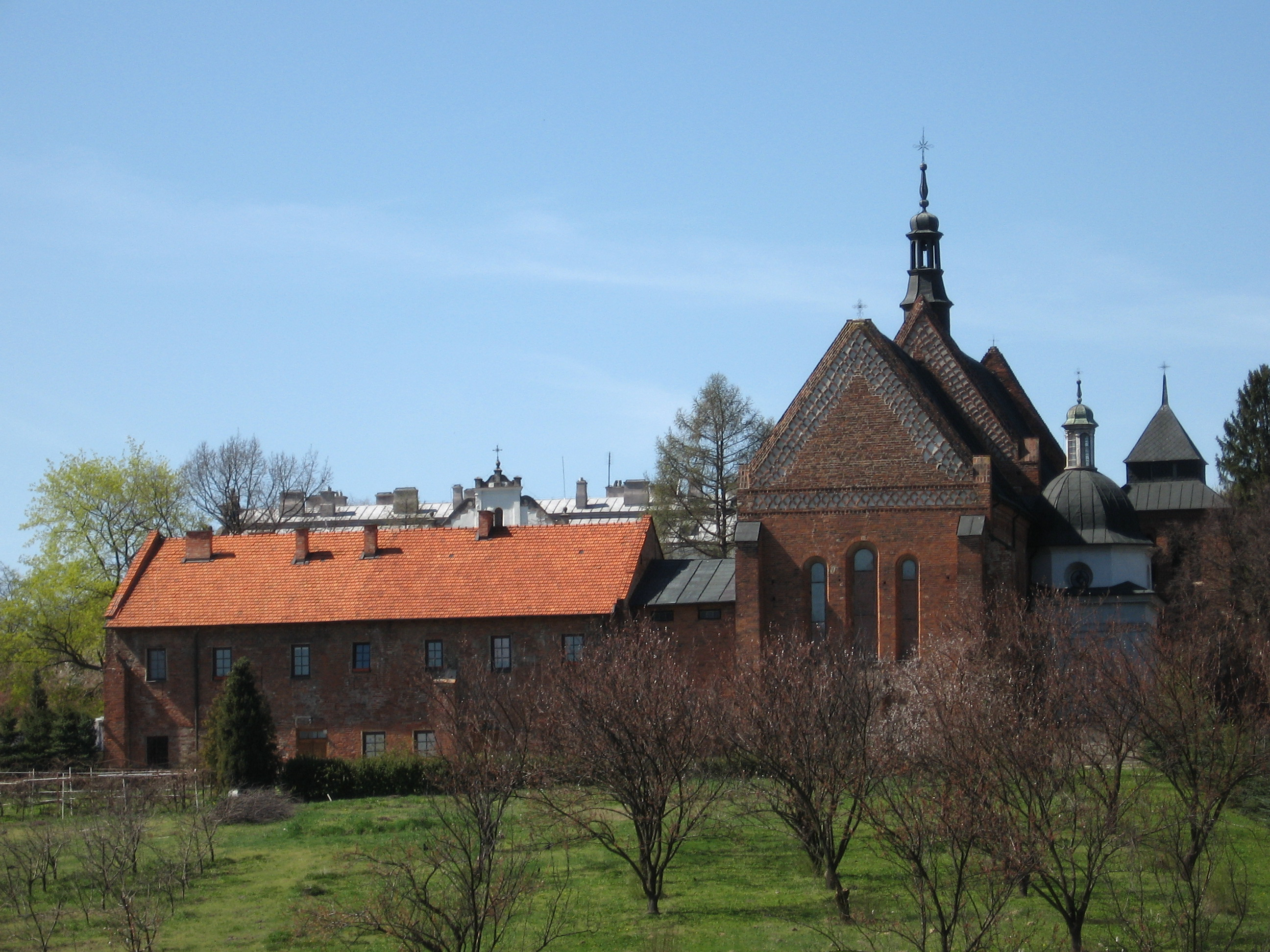
St. Jacob's Church, 13th–14th century

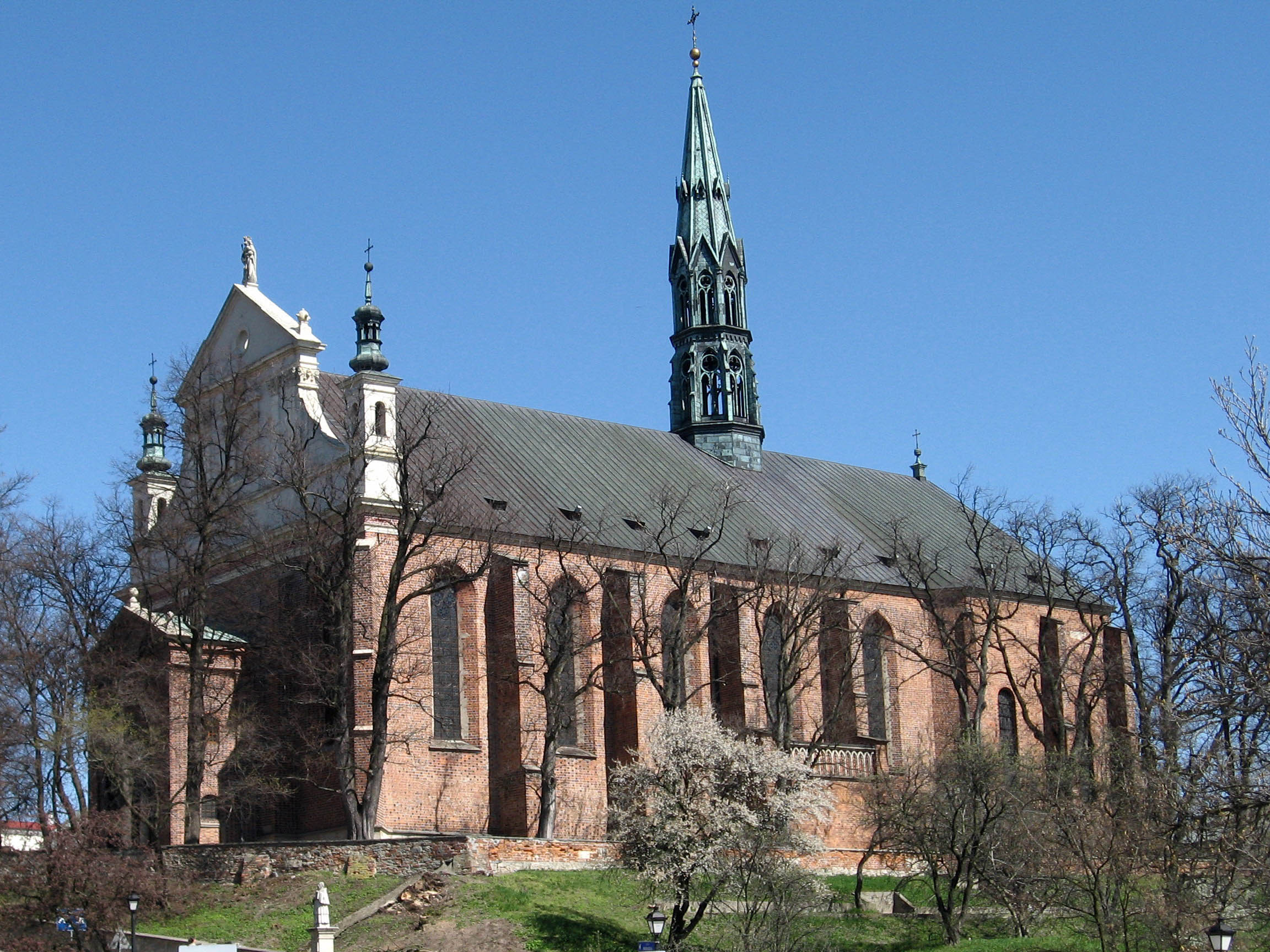
Cathedral

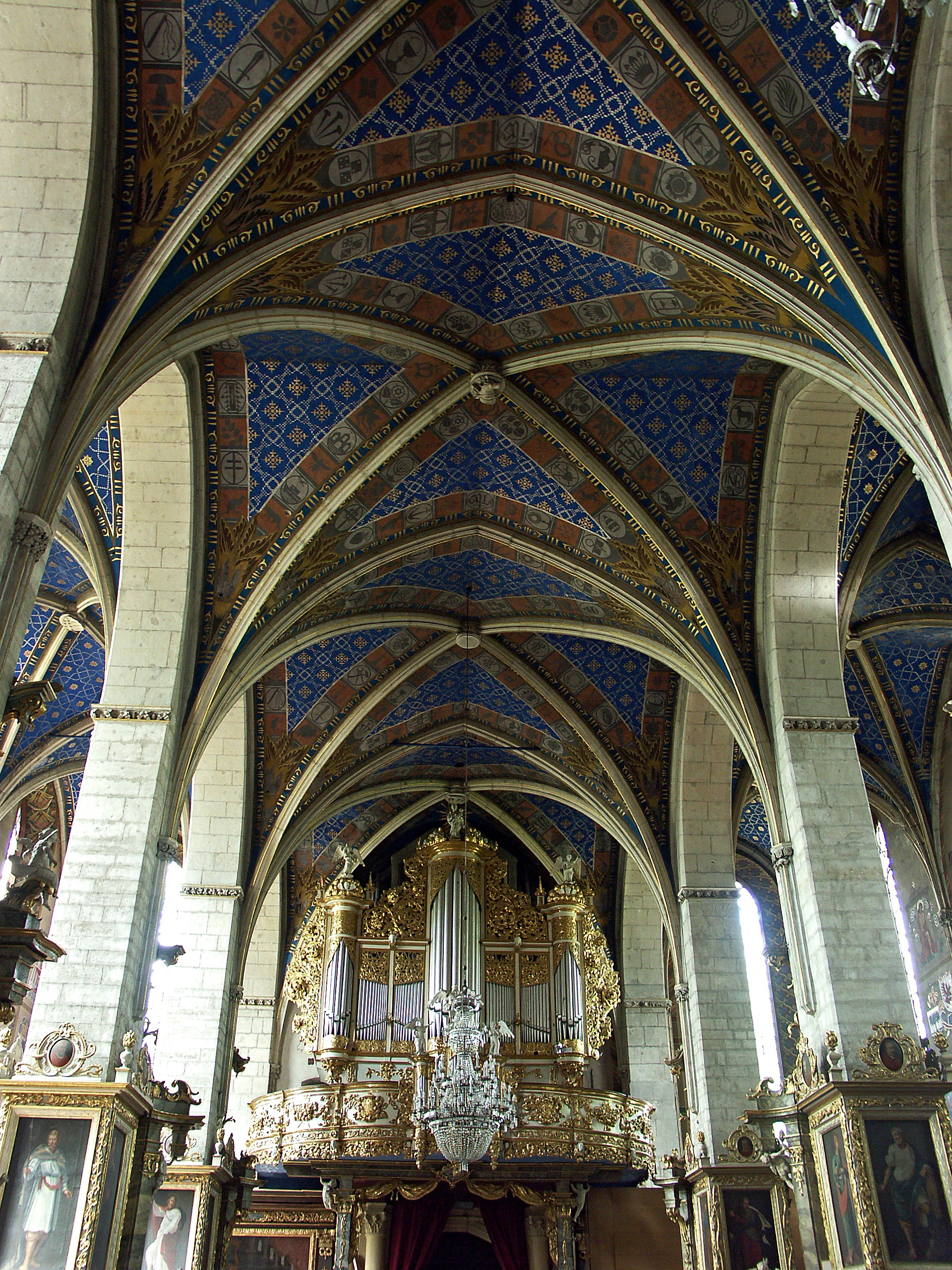
Cathedral, interior

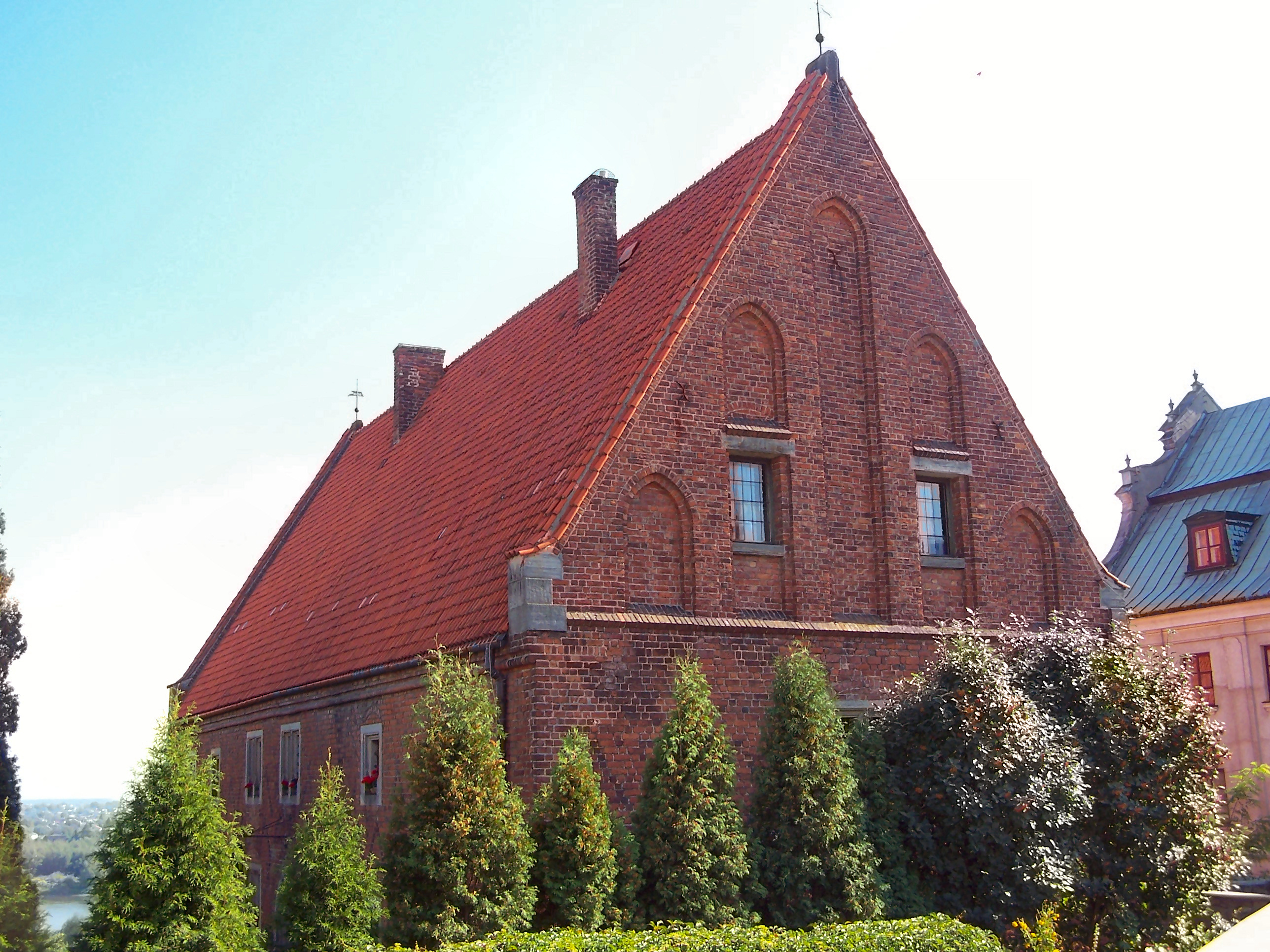
Jan Długosz house

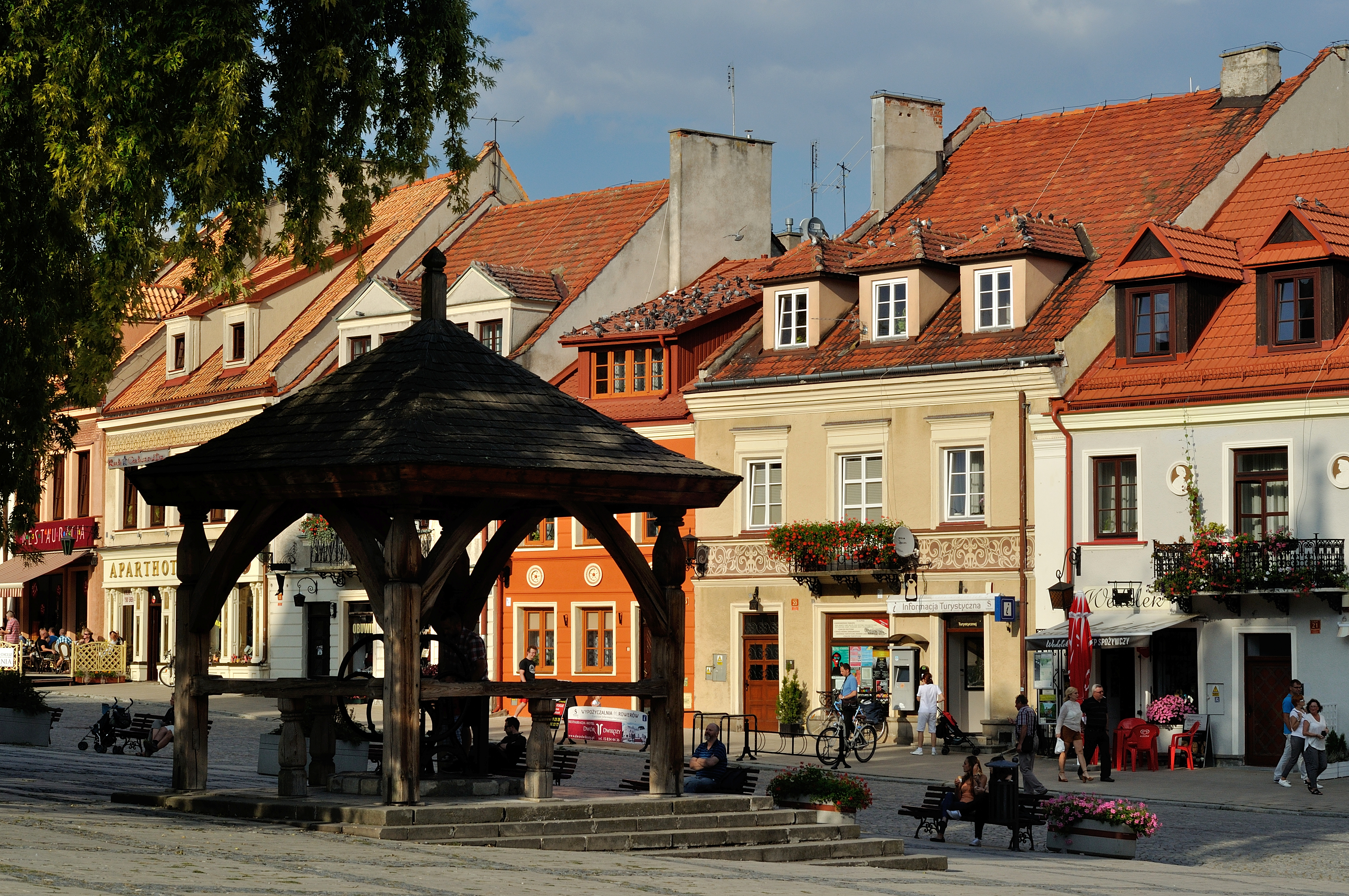
Historic well at the main square

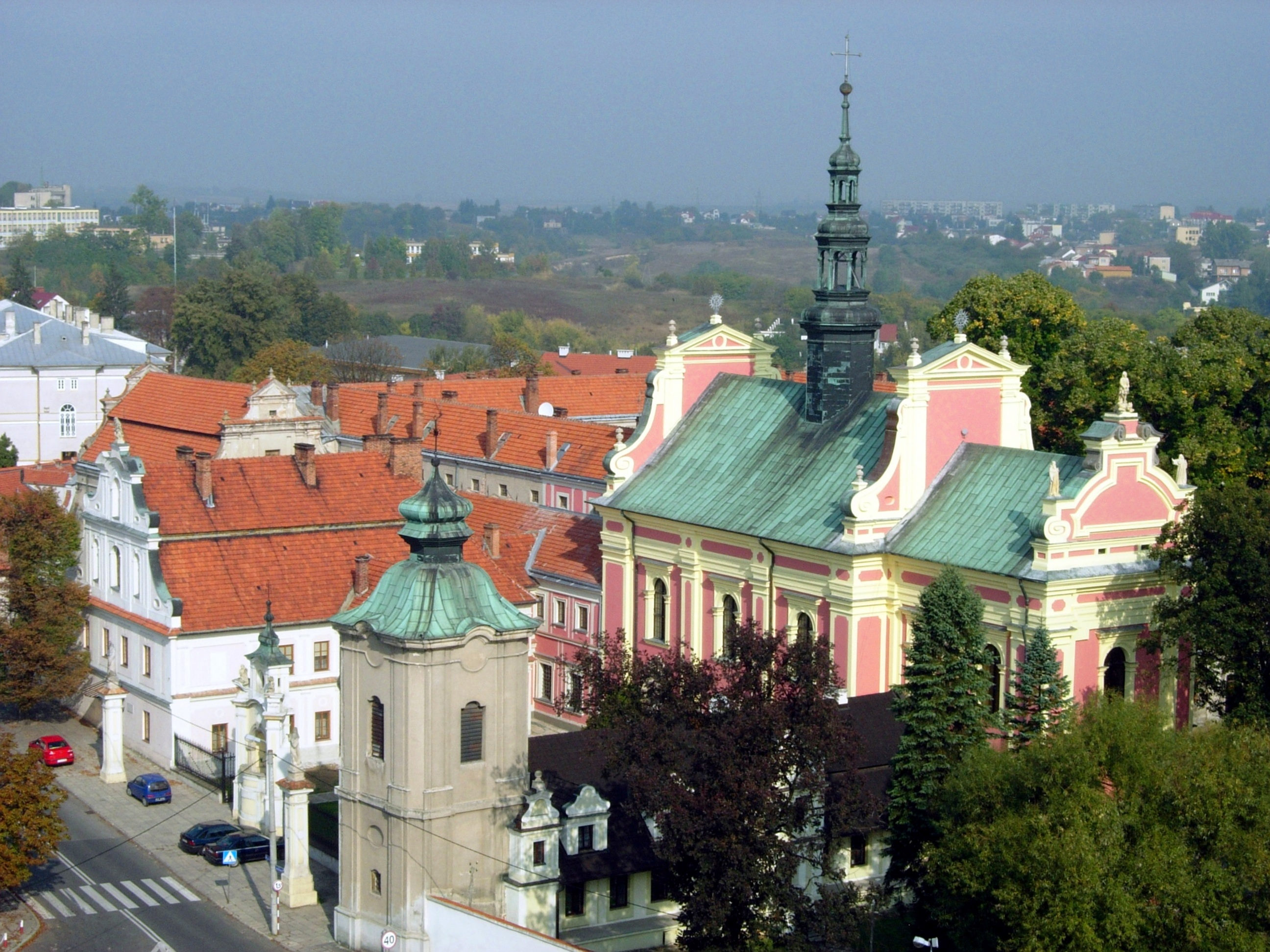
Church of St. Michael

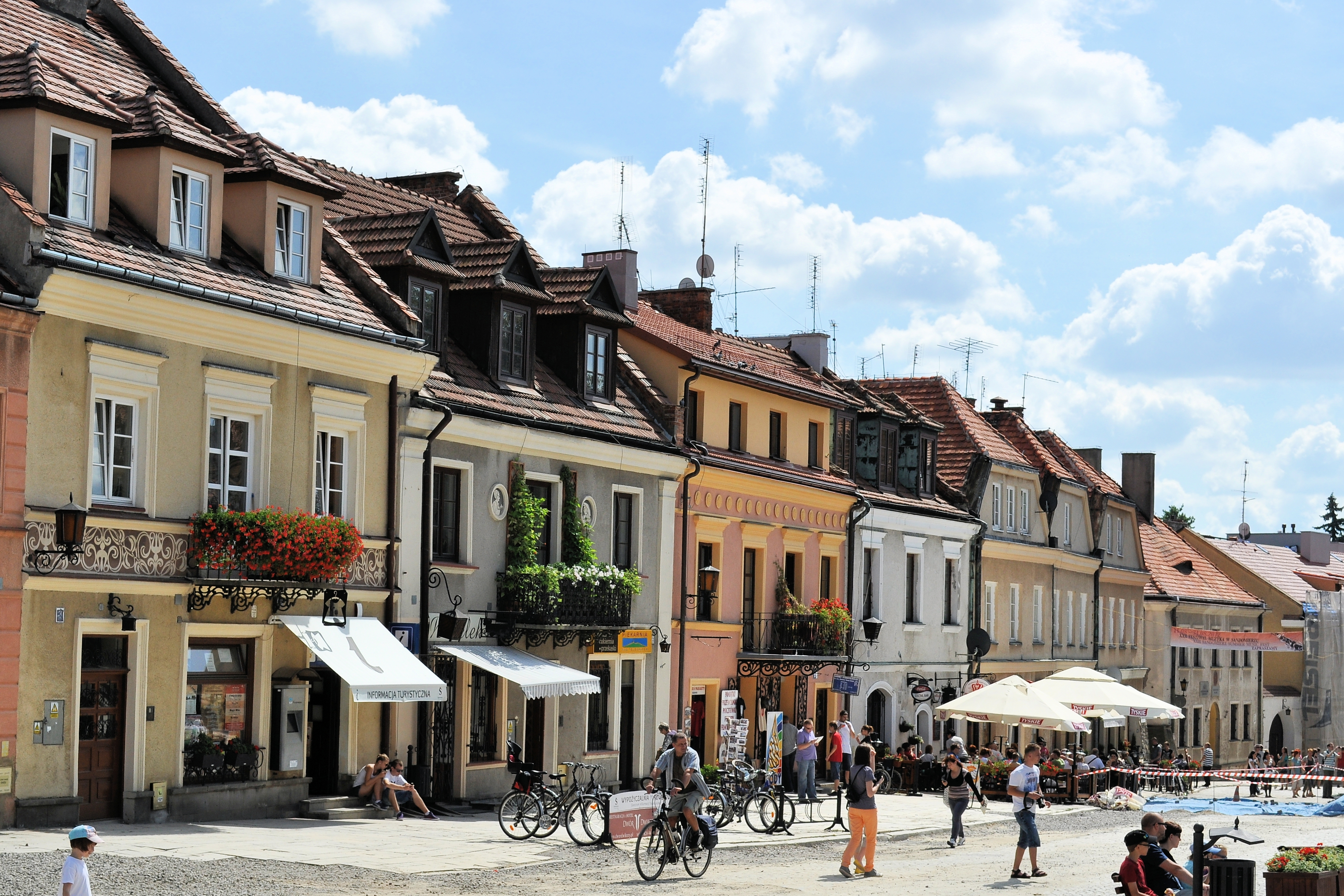
Townhouses at the main market square

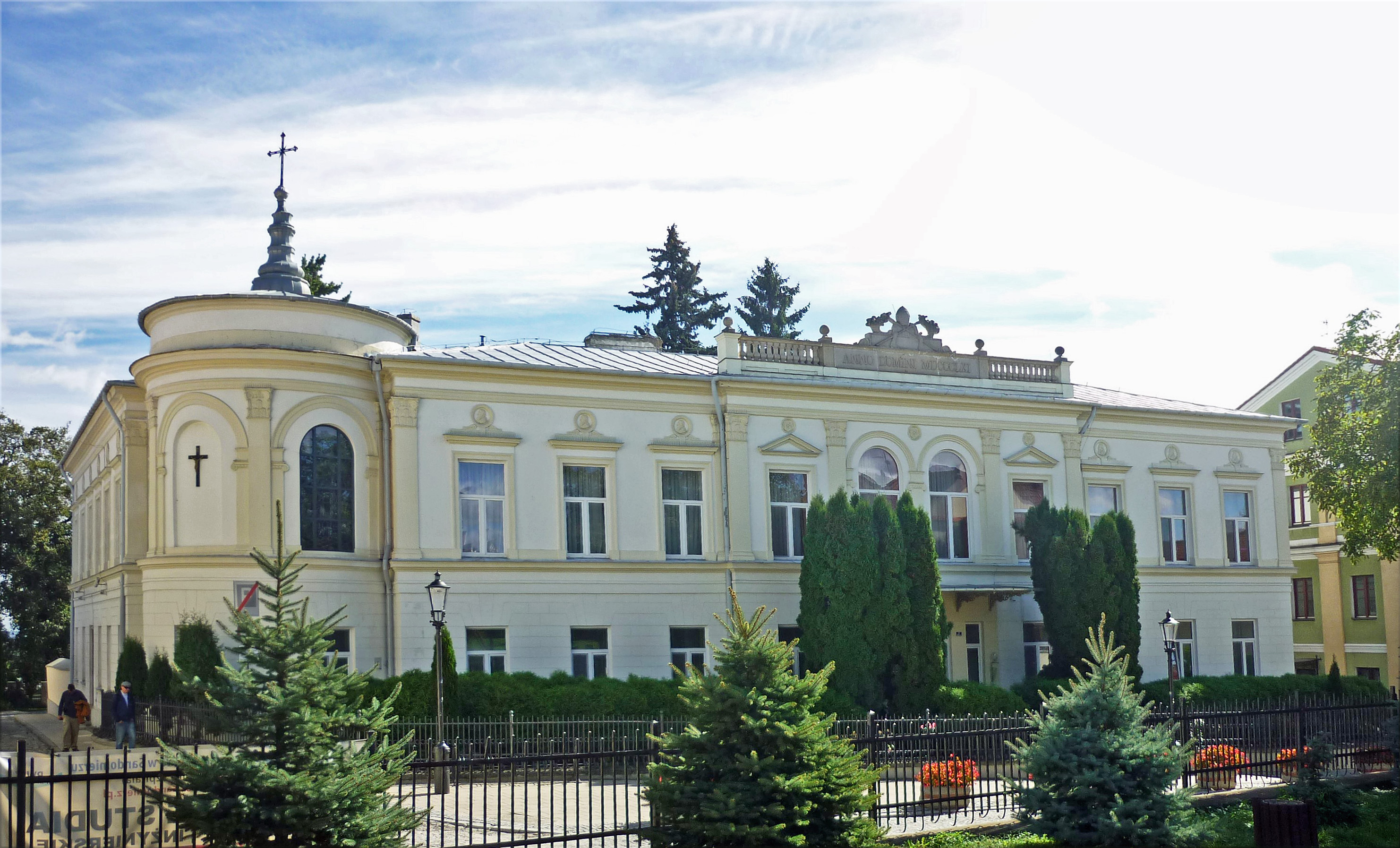
Bishops' Palace

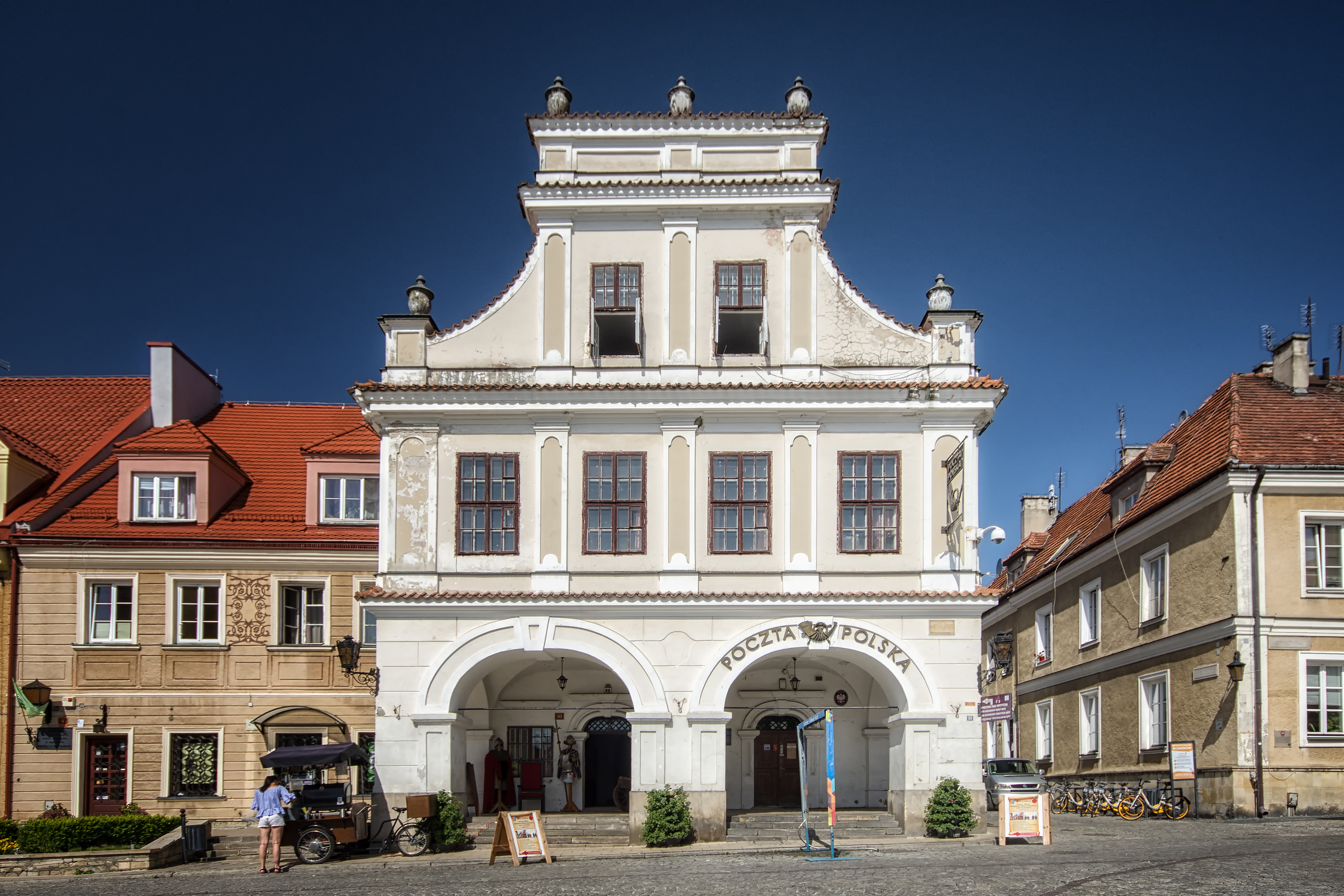
Post office

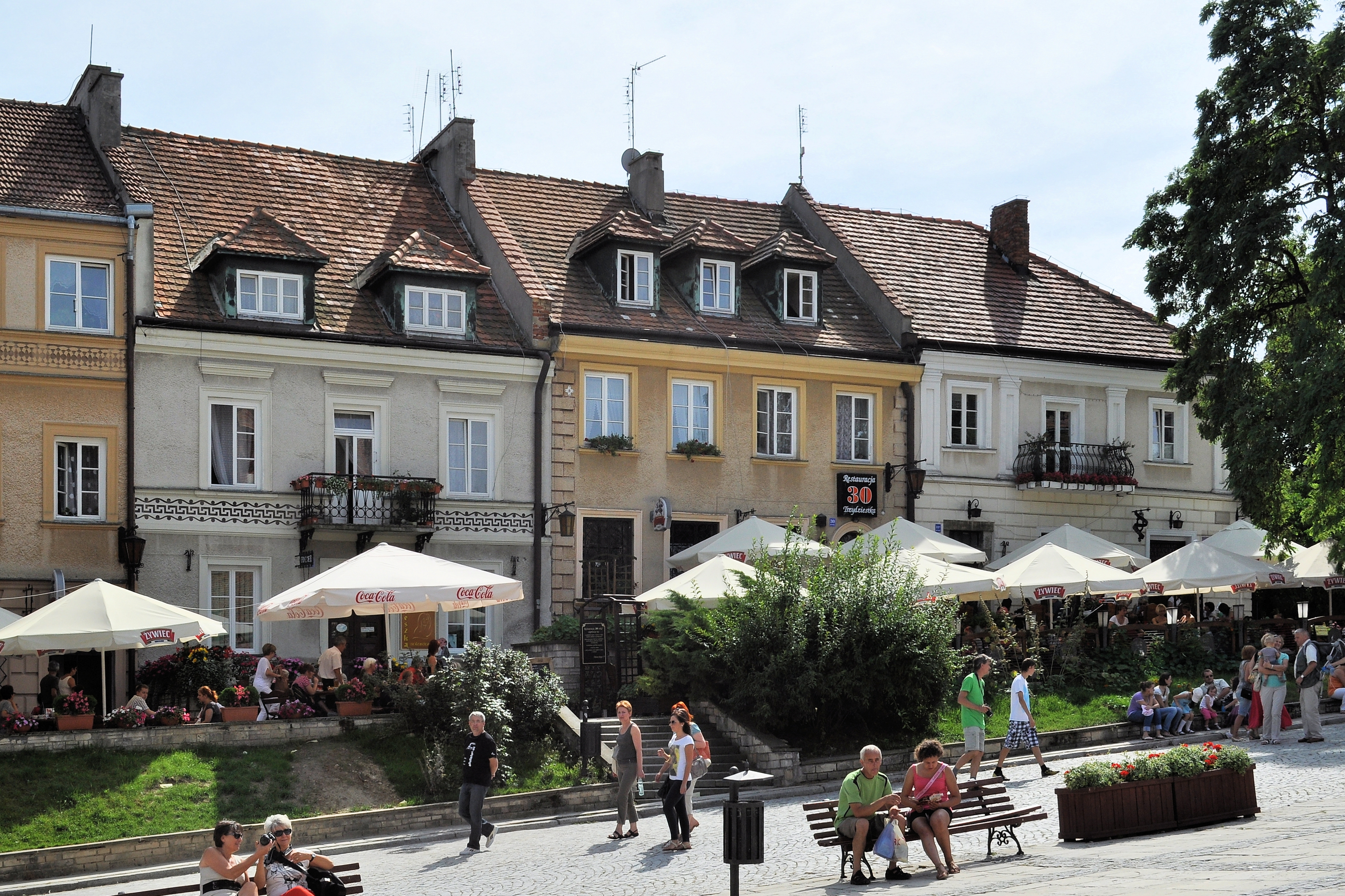
House at 31 Rynek

== Notable residents ==
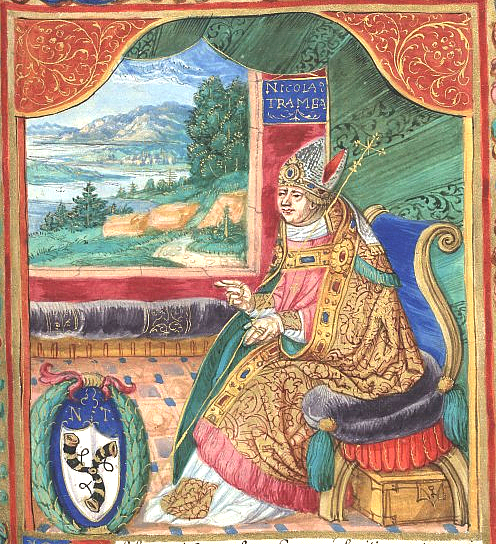
Mikołaj Trąba, first Primate of Poland

- Karol Bielecki (born 1982), handball player
- Wiktor Chabel (born 1985), rower
- Mikołaj Gomółka (1591–1609), Polish Renaissance composer
- Wincenty Kadłubek (1150–1223), mediaeval chronicler
- Karolina Kołeczek (born 1993), athlete specializing in 100 meter hurdles
- Stanisław Krawczyński (1884–1940) medical doctor, member of Polish Parliament
- Wacław Król (1915–1991), Polish military pilot
- Marianna Moszyńska (1710–?), composer and Benedictine nun
- Wiesław Myśliwski (born 1932), writer, Nike Award laureate
- Piotr Nurowski (1945–2010), tennis player, President of the Polish Olympic Committee
- Sebastian Petrycy (1554–1626), philosopher and physician
- Gracjan Piotrkowski (1734–1785), Catholic polemicist
- Andrzej Sarwa (born 1953), writer: a Polish prose writer, poet, journalist
- Andrzej Schinzel (1937–2021), mathematician
- Joseph Schleifstein (born 1941), Holocaust survivor whose life served as inspiration for the script to the movie Life Is Beautiful
- Mikołaj Trąba (1358–1422), Polish Roman Catholic priest, first Primate of Poland
- Stanisław Warszycki (c. 1600 – 1680/1681), nobleman and magnate in the Polish–Lithuanian Commonwealth

== Webcams ==
- City hall & façades of houses on the lower market square
- Panning: Gomulka's House, Kordegarda, Oleśnicki Family's House, rear façade of city hall, water well, Ciżemka
- Panorama
- Panning: City Hall, Main square and Opatowska Tower

== Virtual walks ==
- Google Street View

== See also ==
- Lesser Poland
