= Gracjan Piotrkowski =

Polish Catholic priest, teacher, and writer

Gracjan Piotrkowski (1734 in Sandomierz – 1785 in Lipsko) was a Polish Catholic priest, teacher and writer. Piarist educated, he was famed was his firebrand sermons and satirical poems. In 1772 he has published a book titled "Satyr przeciwko zdaniom i zgorszeniom wieku naszego" ("A satire against ideas and deprivations of our age") containing 25 rhymed satires.
