= Sandomierz Synagogue =

Former synagogue in Sandomierz, Poland

- Polish: Synagoga w Sandomierzu
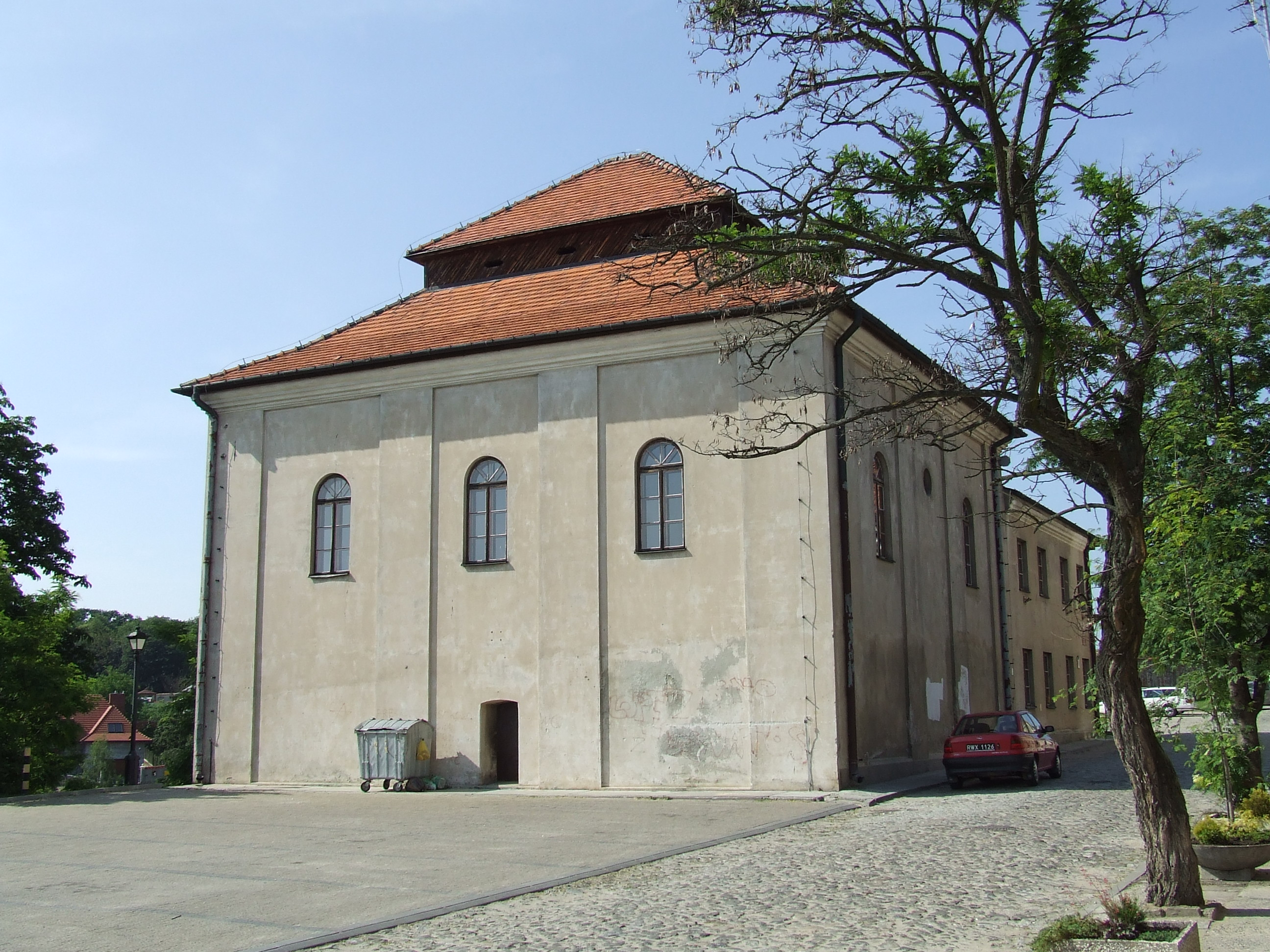
- The former synagogue, in 2006

- Location of the former synagogue in the Świętokrzyskie Voivodeship Sandomierz Synagogue (Poland)

Religion
- Affiliation: Judaism (former)
- Ecclesiastical or organizational status: Synagogue (1768–1942); Polish State Archives (since 1970s)
- Status: Abandoned (as a synagogue); Repurposed

Location
- Location: Sandomierz, Świętokrzyskie Voivodeship
- Country: Poland
- Interactive map of Sandomierz Synagogue
- Coordinates: 50°40′48″N 21°44′53″E

Architecture
- Type: Synagogue architecture
- Style: Baroque
- Completed: 1255 (1st building); 1768 (2nd building)
- Materials: Brick

The Sandomierz Synagogue is a former Jewish congregation and synagogue, that was located in Sandomierz, in the Świętokrzyskie Voivodeship of Poland. Abandoned as a synagogue in 1942 during German occupation in World War II, the building is standing and has been used for secular purposes since the 1970s.

== History ==
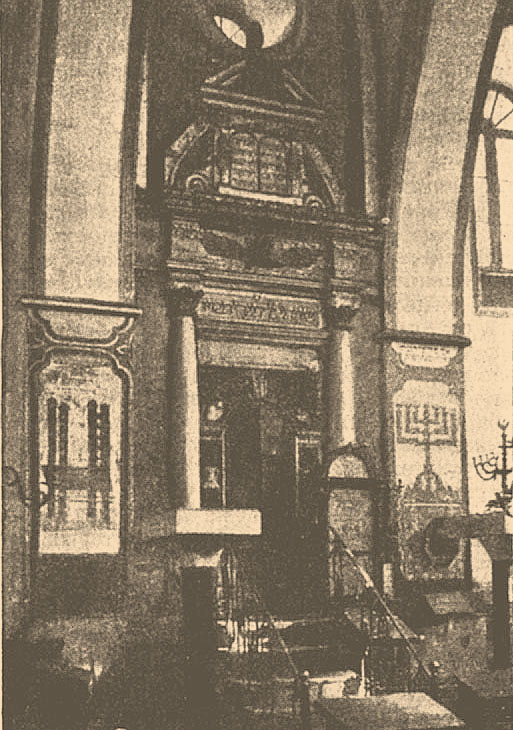
Interior before 1906

The first Jews arrived in Sandomierz in the thirteenth century and the first synagogue in Sandomierz was built in 1255. By the 16th century, the town was one of the largest Jewish communities in Poland, according to taxation records. The Jewish community was attacked during the Swedish invasions by both Swedish and Polish forces. In 1712, Jews were ordered to leave the city by King Augustus II the Strong, although the order was likely unenforced. The first synagogue was destroyed by fire.

Despite the official decree, the brick synagogue was built in 1768 in the Polish Baroque style, after the old synagogue burned down again for the last time in 1758. The building was renovated several times in its history, notably in 1872, 1911 and 1929. This new synagogue was used for nearly two centuries before it was devastated by the Nazis during World War II, and abandoned by the community during the Holocaust.

The building still exists, however, is no longer used as a synagogue. A subsequent renovation in the 1970s has enabled the building to be used as a repository for the Polish State Archives.

== See also ==
- History of the Jews in Poland
- List of synagogues in Poland
