= List of Gothic brick buildings in Poland =

This list is a part of the international List of Gothic brick buildings. For the parts of this list on the various countries see:

Navigation: BELA • BEL • CZ • DK • ENG • EST • FIN • FRA • GER • HUNG • ITA • LAT • LIT • NL • POL • RUS • SK • SWE • SWI • UKR

– In long tables, vertical arrows link to the navigation boards above (after the preceding table) and below (before the next table). –

Navigation: W.POM • GDA.POM • CHŁM • WAR+MAS+POW • GR-PL+KUJ+LĘC • MAZ • LUBU • EAST • SIL • LESS.PL

== Western Pomerania ==
– and other former territories of the House of the Griffins –

Chojna • Darłowo • Gryfice • Myślibórz • Słupsk • Szczecin

↕	Place	Building	Main period of construction	Special features	Image
↓	Banie	St. George Chapel	15th century		
↓	Barlinek	Church of St. Mary	15th century	lot of alterations in 18th century	
↓	Baszewice	Village church	15th century		
↓	Białogard	St. Mary's Church	14th century	basilica	
↓	Białogard	St. George's Church	14th century		
↓	Bierzwnik, Choszczno County	Cistercian monastery of Bierzwnik	14th/15th centuries	restored church, ruins of a Gothic brewery	
↓	Bonin	St Isidor (Kościół św. Izydora)	15th century		
↓	Budzistowo	Church of St. John the Baptist	13th century	later alterations	
↓	Buk, Police County	St. Anthony church	13th century	eastern gable triangle of mainly granite building	
↓	Bukowo Morskie	Church of the Sacred Heart	13th/14th century	Cistercian hall church	
↓	Cerkwica	Church Jesus' Heart	15th century		
↑	Charnowo, Pomeranian Voivodeship	Village church	15th century	only steeple of brick, cross shaped nave of framework	
↓	Chojna	Town hall	15th century		
↑	Chojna	St. Mary's Church	mainly 1389–1459		
↓	Chojna	Holy Trinity Church	13th–15th century	former Augustine monastery, 1536 secularized	
↑	Chojna	St. Gertrude Chapel		today ruins and memorial	
↓	Chojna	City gates	14th–15th century	Brama Świecka & Brama Barnkowska	
↑	Narost (Gmina Chojna)	Mary Queen of Poland church	2nd half of 13th century	Romanesque/Gothic, window framings of brick, later alterations, steeple Gothic Revival	
↑	Choszczno	St. Mary Church	14th century	predecessor of granite 13th century	
↓	Choszczno	Defensive walls	14th/15th centuries		
↑	Chwarszczany	Saint Stanislaus Kostka church	1280		
↓	Cisowo	Saint Stanislaus Kostka church in Cisowo	14th century		
↑	Czernin	Church of the Assumption	14th–15th century	alterations 17th & 19th centuries	
↓	Darłowo	Darłowo Castle	since 1352		
↑	Darłowo	St. Mary's Church	since early 14th century		
↓	Darłowo	High Gate (Brama Wysoka)			
↑	Gryfice	St. Mary's Church	15th century		
↓	Gryfice	St. George's Chapel	14th century		
↑	Gryfice	Fortifications with the Powder Tower	14th/15th century	High Gate and Stone Gate	
↓	Drawsko Pomorskie	Resurrection Church	mid 14th to mid 15th century	hall church	
↑	Goleniów	St. Catharine Church	15th century		
↓	Górki, Kamień County	Our Lady of Częstochowa church	15th & 18th century		
↑	Gosław	Christ the King church	13th & 15th century		
↓	Granowo	Mary Help church	13th/14th, steeple 15th century	boulders with edges of brick	
↑	Gryfino	Nativity of the Virgin Mary	13th–15th centuries	brick above level of the drippings	
↓	Iwięcino	St Mary Queen of Poland Church			
↑	Kamień Pomorski	Cathedral of St. John	about 1175, altered in 15th century	Romanesque-Gothic basilica	
↓	Kamień Pomorski	Town hall	13th century	Renaissance alterations in 16th century	
↑	Klępicz	St. Stanislaus	steeple 13th century	edges and older windows of the steeple of brick; nave 16th/17th century	
↓	Klępino	Church of the Nativity of the Virgin Mary	14th/15th century	gable triangle of brick abov ewalls of boulders	
↑	Kłodkowo	St. Mary Church	15th century	wooden steeple	
↓	Kołbacz	Cistercian Abbey	1210–1347	church and a magazin building; Historic Monument of Poland	
↑	Kołobrzeg	Co-Cathedral of the Assumption	1288–1397	hall church, five naves	
↓	Konikowo	Sacred Heart Church	14th century	since reconstruction in 19th century only choir original	
↑	Kościernica	St Marry Queen of Poland		only tower and upper eastern gable of brick	
↓	Koszalin	St. Mary's Church	1300–1333	cathedral since 1972	
↑	Koszalin	Dormition of St. Mary	rebuilt beginning of 17th century	nowadays Orthodox church	
↓	Kozielice	Christ the King church	15th century	steeple 1594	
↑	Krupy	St. Mary church	steeple 14th century	nave of framework behind brick, about 1570	
↓	Maszewo	Our Lady of Częstochowa church	14th century	base of the steeple of stone	
↓	Mechowo	St. Michael	13th or 16th century	steeple 1911	
↑	Mieszkowice	Church of the Transfiguration	14th century	hall church with flat ceilings; Gothic Revival additions	
↓	Myślibórz	Collegiate Church	(13th–)15th century	partly stone base of a predecessor	
↑	Myślibórz	former Dominican monastery	1433 – about 1500		
↓	Myślibórz	St. Gertrude Chapel (Kaplica św. Gertrudy)	15th century		
↑	Myślibórz	Holy Ghost Chapel (Kaplica Św. Ducha)	1514	ground flour of stone	
↓	Myślibórz	Fortifications	gates 14th century: Brama Nowogródzka; Brama Pyrzycka; Powder Tower (Baszta Prochowa)		
↓	Niemierze	Village church	14th – 16th centuries	brick & boulders; later alterations	
↑	Nowogard	Church of the Assumption of St. Mary	15th/16th centuries	stepped hall	
↓	Osieki	St Anthony church	14th century		
↑	Police	Gothic Chapel St. Boleslaw	15th century	rest of the former St. Mary's Church from 13./14th century	
↓	Police	St. Peter and Paul in (Jasienica)	1299	alterations in 1725; other buildings of the monastery in ruins	
↑	Pyrzyce	St. Maurice / Assumption of St. Mary	1st half of 14th century	pseudo-basilica, steeple replaced in 1739, after WW II reconstruction 1958–1966	
↓	Pyrzyce	Our Lady of Sorrows church	1260	alterations 19th century	
↑	Recz	Christ the King church	14th/15th centuries	alterations in 19th century	
↓	Rożnowo	Our Lady of Częstochowa church	15th century	building of boulders with edges of brick	
↑	Rusowo	Mother of God church (Kościół filialny Matki Bożej Różańcowej)	14 & 16th century	tower of brick upon a nave of boulders	
↓	Sianów	St. Stanislaus Kostka Church	steeple 16th century	framework nave 1793	
↑	Sierakowo Sławieńskie	Our Lady of the Rosary church	15th & 17th centuries	brick and boulders	
↓	Sławno	Church of Our Lady	1326–1364		
↑	Słupsk	St. Mary's Church	1276/80–1350		
↓	Słupsk	St. John's or St. Hyazinth Church	13th century		
↑	Słupsk	Castle Mill			
↓	Słupsk	Fortifications	Mill Gate; New Gate; Witches' Tower		
↑	Śmiechów	Our Lady Queen of Poland church	13th/14th centuries		
↓	Stargard	St. Mary's	13th-century origins, 1388–1500 additions		
↑	Stargard	Mill Gate	15th century	one of only two surviving examples of such gates (the other one Waterpoort, the Netherlands)	
↓	Stargard	Towers of the defensive wall	2nd half of 14th century	Red Sea Tower; Ice Tower; Prisoners' Tower	
↑	Stary Jarosław	Holy Cross church	steeple about 1400	nave younger	
↓	Stary Klukom	Ascension of Lord (Wniebowstąpienia Pańskiego)	2nd half of 15th century	boulders; simple decorations of brick on eastern gable and at the windows; alterations in 2nd half of 19th century	
↑	Świdwin	St. Mary	14th century	basilica, later alterations	
↓	Świdwin	Castle	1382–1455	founded by the Teutonic Order; alterations in 18th century	
↑	Świdwin	Stone Gate (Brama Kamienna)			
↓	Świelino	Sts. Peter & Paul	15th century	alterations in 1840	
↑	Swobnica	St. Casimir church	13th century	eastern gable (above the newer presbytery) and some edges of brick	
↓	Szczecin	Szczecin Cathedral	several phases between 1375 and 1504	hall church	
↑	Szczecin	St. John	13th to 15th century	19th-century renovations; hall church	
↓	Szczecin	Old Town Hall	15th century		
↑	Szczecinek	St Nicholas steeple	16th century	nave converted into a museum building	
↓	Trzcińsko-Zdrój	St. Mary Help church	13th & 15th century	boulders with edges of brick, hall church	
↑	Trzebiatów	St. Mary's Church	14th & 15th century	hall church, altered in 17th century	
↓	Trzęsacz, Gryfice County	Ruins of the church	around 1270	ruins on top of the escarpment of the coast, destroyed by its erosion	
↑	Tuczno (Hist. to greater Poland)	Assumption of St. Mary church	1522		
↓	Tychowo	Mary Queen of Poland church	steeple 14th century	nave 19th century	
↑	Wełtyń	Our Lady of the Rosary church	15th century	alterations in 1690 & 1784	
↑	Witnica	Christ the King church	13th/14th century	alterations in 15th & 19th centuries	
↑	Wolin	St. Nicholas church	about 1300	pseudo-basilica with galleries and flat ceilings	
↑	Wrzosowo, Kołobrzeg County	Transfiguration Church	13th, 15th & 16th centuries		

Western Pomerania ⬆ : Chojna • Darłowo • Gryfice • Myślibórz • Słupsk • Szczecin

Navigation: W.POM • GDA.POM • CHŁM • WAR+MAS+POW • GR-PL+KUJ+LĘC • MAZ • LUBU • EAST • SIL • LESS.PL

== Gdańsk Pomerania ==
– Subregion of the historic Pomerania region, part of Pomeranian Voivodeship west of Vistula river and a section of Kujavian-Pomeranian Voivodeship around Świecie;
ruled by the Teutonic Order from 1309/1317 to 1454/1466 –

Chojnice • Gdańsk • Gniew • Pelplin • Starogard Gdański • Tczew

↕	Place	Building	Main period of construction	Special features	Image
↑	Bytów	Bytów Castle	1398–1405	outer wall partly of stone	
↑	Bytów	Old St. Catherine church		only the steeple preserved	
↑	Cedry Wielkie (Gdańsk County)	Church of the Holy Guardian Angels	14th century	in 17th century enlarged to be a pseudo-basilica	
↑	Trutnowy (Gmina Cedry Wielkie)	Sts. Peter and Paul church	14th century		
↑	Wocławy (Gmina Cedry Wielkie)	Sts. Peter and Paul church	14th century	alterations in 1730; ruins since 1945	
↑	Chojnice	St. John's Church	1340–1360		
↑	Chojnice	City fortifications		Brama Człuchowska (gate); Wronia tower; Szewska tower; Kurza Stopa tower	
↓	Ostrowite (Gmina Chojnice)	St. James church	1403–1435	choir and steeple of brick	
↑	Człuchow	Castle	1325–1365	only tower preserved; attached church from 1826–1828	
↓	Dzierzazno (Gmina Morzeszczyn)	St. James church (św. Jakuba Apostoła)	1580 (!)	steeple of framework 1768	
↑	Dzierzgoń (Sztum County)	Holy Trinity church	1310–1320	alterations in 1730	
↓	Dzierzgoń (Sztum County)	St. Anne Chapel	15th century	alterations in 1737	
↑	Dzierzgoń (Sztum County)	Castle of the Teutonic Order		only foundations preserved	
↓	Gdańsk	St. Mary's Church	1343–1502	with c. 190,000 m^{3} one of the largest hall churches of the world, second or third largest Gothic brick church (San Petronio, Bologna c. 258,000 m^{3}, Ulm Minster c. 190,000 m^{3}, Frauenkirche, Munich c. 185,000–190,000 m^{3})	
↑	Gdańsk	St. Catherine's Church	probably 14th and 15th century		
↓	Gdańsk	Basilica of St. Nicholas	1348-early 15th century	Dominican church	
↑	Gdańsk	Church of Holy Trinity	1481–1514	former Franciscan monastery	
↓	Gdańsk	St. George guildhall	1487–94		
↑	Gdańsk	Schlieff House	1520	masonry made in Venice – originally for Nuremberg	
↓	Gdańsk	Great Mill	14th century		
↑	Gdańsk	Crane Gate	1442–1444		
↓	Gdańsk	St. Mary's Gate	15th century		
↑	Oliwa (Gdańsk)	Oliwa Cathedral	14th century	Cistercian Abbey	
↑	Oliwa (Gdańsk)	House of Plague	14th century	Cistercian Abbey	
↓	Gniew	Castle of the Teutonic Order	late 13th to 14th century		
↑	Gniew	St. Nicholas	1st half of 14th century	alterations in 1870	
↓	Piaseczno (Gmina Gniew)	Nativity of the Virgin Mary	1348, 15th century	alterations 1676 and later	
↑	Hel	Sts. Peter & Paul church	14th century	today a museum	
↓	Jeziernik (Gmina Ostaszewo)	St. George church	mid 14th century	wooden steeple 17th century	
↑	Kartuzy	Collegiate St. Mary's	1383–1405	Baroque alterations in 1731–1733	
↓	Lublewo Gdańskie (Gmina Kolbudy)	St. Mary Queen of Poland	14th century	alterations in 1683	
↑	Pręgowo (Gmina Kolbudy)	Corpus Christi church	14th century	18th century alterations	
↓	Krzyżanowo (Gmina Stare Pole)	St. Barbara church	14th/15th century		
↑	Lębork	St. James' Church	14th/15th century		
↑	Mierzeszyn (Gmina Trąbki Wielkie)	Saint Bartholomew church	14th century	alterations in 18th and 20th centuries, only eastern gable almost original	
↓	Miłoradz	St Michael church	14th/15th century		
↑	Gnojewo (Gmina Miłoradz)	St. Simon & Jude	14th–16th centuries	steeple 1853/1854; 1945 half a ruin	
↓	Kończewice (Gmina Miłoradz)	Village church	14th/15th century		
↑	Mątowy Wielkie (Gmina Miłoradz)	Sts. Peter and Paul church	about 1340		
↓	Stara Kościelnica (Gmina Miłoradz)	St. George church	about 1400	alterations in 1816	
↑	Niedźwiedzica (Gmina Stegna)	St. James church (Kościół św. Jakuba)	mid 14th century	alterations in 19th century	
↓	Nowe (Świecie County)	St. Mathew Church	14th/15th century	alterations 1910–1912	
↑	Nowe (Świecie County)	Castle of the Teutonic Order	14th century	1266 seat of a noble family, 1313 bought by the Teutonic Order, 1465 military parts destroyed by the citizens	
↓	Nowy Staw	Collegiate St. Matthew	beginning of 15th century	alterations in 1573/1574	
↑	Myszewo (Gmina Nowy Staw)	Holy Cross church	1382	western gable new	
↓	Cyganek (Gmina Nowy Dwór Gdański)	St. Nicholas church	1352	alterations in 1637–1674, western part of the nave of framework	
↑	Lubieszewo (Gm. Nowy Dwór Gd.)	Church of Elisabeth of Hungary	14th & 16th century	alterations 19th century	
↓	Marynowy (Gm. Nowy Dwór Gd.)	St. Anne church	mid 14th century	alterations in 1619	
↑	Orłowo (Gm. Nowy Dwór Gd.)	St. Barbara church	mid 14th century	wooden steeple late 17th century	
↓	Tuja (Gm. Nowy Dwór Gd.)	St. James the Greater church	14th century	hall church	
↑	Oksywie (Gdynia)	St. Michael church	13th & 14th century	brick with intermingled boulders	
↓	Ostaszewo (Nowy Dwór County)	Old church of St. John the Baptist	mid 14th century	later alterations	
↑	Puck	Sts. Peter & Paul church	1283 to 14th century	alterations 17th century	
↓	Pelplin	Cathedral Basilica of the Assumption	13th/14th century	originally Cistercian	
↑	Pelplin	Corpus Christi church	15th century	17th century changes. The outer skin looks like destroyed by overshooting recent renovation.	
↓	Lignowy Szlacheckie (Gmina Pelplin)	Sts. Martin & Margret church	2nd half of 14th century	17th century alterations	
↑	Wielki Garc (Gmina Pelplin)	Church of the Immaculate Conception	16th century	mostly Gothic, steeple completed in Renaissance style	
↓	Pruszcz Gdański (Gdańsk County)	Church of the Exaltation of the Cross	15th century		
↑	Przezmark (Gmina Stary Dzierzgoń)	Castle of the Teutonic Order		except one tower sparse remains	
↓	Skarszewy (Starogard County)	St. Michel church	14th century	upper eastern gable of 1868	
↑	Skórcz	All Saints church		later alterations	
↓	Barłożno (Gmina Skórcz)	St. Martin church	14th/15th century	baroque alterations; eastern gable Brick Gothic	
↑	Czarnylas (Gmina Skórcz)	St. Andrew church	14th century	altered to Baroque in 17th century, only eastern gable still Brick Gothic	
↓	Pączewo (Gmina Skórcz)	Church of the Annunciation	14th century	building of Boulders with Gothic eastern gable and Baroque steeple	
↑	Kościelna Jania (Gm. Smętowo Graniczne)	Holy trinity church (Kościół Świętej Trójcy)	tower finished in 1622	tower nevertheless of Gothic appearance, nave consecrated in 1633	
↓	Lalkowy (Gm. Smętowo Graniczne)	St. Barbara church	14th/15th century	new decorated gables on steeple and nave	
↑	Starogard Gdański	St. Matthew church	14th century		
↓	Starogard Gdański	Defensive walls		towers: Baszta Gdańska; Baszta Wodna	
↑	Dąbrówka (Gmina Starogard Gdański)	Exaltation of the Holy Cross (Podwyższenia Krzyża Świętego)	14th/15th century		
↓	Jabłowo (Gm. Starograd Gd.)	St. Lawrence (Kościół św. Wawrzyńca)		gables probably newer	
↑	Klonówka (Gm. Starograd Gd.)	St. Catherine (Kościół św. Katarzyny)	14th century		
↓	Kokoszkowy (Gm. Starograd Gd.)	St. Barbara	14th century	windows & gables of brick on a building of boulders, decorated gable with Renaissance elements	
↑	Lubochowo (Gmina Stary Dzierzgoń)	Sts. Peter & Paul church	about 1350	alterations in 18th century	
↓	Myślice (Gmina Stary Dzierzgoń)	Church of the Assumption	14th century	alterations in 1872	
↑	Stary Targ	Sts. Simon and Jude church (św. Apostołów Szymona i Judy Tadeusza)	1st half of 14th century	alterations in 1821 & 1905–1906	
↓	Kalwa (Gmina Stary Targ)	St. Mary Magdalene church (św. Marii Magdaleny)	1286, 1310, 1420	lower and middling walls of boulders; wooden steeple of 1821	
↑	Nowy Targ (Gmina Stary Targ)	Saint Roch church (Kościoł fil. św. Rocha)		first church on this site since 1340; 19th century alterations	
↓	Subkowy	St. Stanislaus	14th/15th century	alterations 1600, about 1850, 1907	
↑	Gorzędziej (Gmina Subkowy)	St. Adalbert	15th century	18th/19th century alterations	
↓	Suchy Dąb	St. Anna	14th century	alterations in 1732	
↑	Koźliny (Gmina Suchy Dąb)	St. Mary church	1353	eastern gable altered to Renaissance	
↓	Krzywe Koło (Gmina Suchy Dąb)	Church of the Holy Cross	14th century	alterations in 1685-1686 and 1748	
↑	Osice (Gmina Suchy Dąb)	St. Anthony church (Świętego Antoniego z Padwy)	14th/15th century	eastern gable new??	
↓	Steblewo (Gmina Suchy Dąb)	Church	14th/15th century	ruins since 1945	
↑	Świecie	Teutonic Castle	1335–1350	destroyed in 1664 (Deluge)	
↓	Świecie	Parish Church	15th–early 16th century	after destruction by Swedish troops reconstructed in 1626–1629 in Renaissance style	
↑	Tczew	Holy Cross Church	13th century	hall church	
↓	Tczew	St. Stanislaus Kostka Church	14th century	former Dominican monastery	
↑	Lubiszewo Tczewskie (Gmina Tczew)	Holy Trinity church	1348	later alterations	
↑	Miłobądz (Gmina Tczew)	St. Mary Church	end 14th to 15th century		
↑	Żarnowiec (Gmina Krokowa)	Church of the Annunciation (Zwiastowania NMP)	13th century	former monastery	
↑	Żukowo (Kartuzy County)	Assumption of St. Mary church	14th/15th century	alterations in 17th century	

Gdańsk Pomerania ⬆ : Chojnice • Gdańsk • Gniew • Pelplin • Starogard Gdański • Tczew

Navigation: W.POM • GDA.POM • CHŁM • WAR+MAS+POW • GR-PL+KUJ+LĘC • MAZ • LUBU • EAST • SIL • LESS.PL

== Land of Chełmno ==
– Subregion of the historic Pomerania region, mostly within the Kujavian-Pomeranian Voivodeship, with a small portion in the Warmian-Masurian Voivodeship; territory of the Teutonic Order from 1225 to 1454/1466 –

Bobrowo • Brodnica • Chełmno • Chełmza • Chełmża • Dębowa Łąka • Grudziądz • Kowalewo Porskie • Radzyń Chełmiński • Toruń

↕	Place	Building	Main period of construction	Special features	Image
↑	Błędowo (Gmina Płużnica)	St. Michael church	14th and 15th century	destroyed in 1410	
↑	Bobrowo (Brodnica County)	Saint James church	13th/14th century	steeple 1755	
↑	Brudzawy (Gmina Bobrowo)	St. Andrew church	brick 15th century	restituted 1645	
↑	Kruszyny (Gmina Bobrowo)	St. Nicholas church	14th century		
↑	Nieżywięć (Gmina Bobrowo)	St. George church	13th century/14th century		
↑	Nieżywięć (Gmina Bobrowo)	St. John the Baptist church	beginning of 14th century		
↓	Brodnica	St. Catherine	14th century	hall church	
↑	Brodnica	Castle of the Teutonic Order	14th century	mostly dismantled in 18th-19th centuries. 54-m tower is the best preserved part	
↓	Brodnica	Chełmno City Gate	beginning of 14th century	part of the city fortifications	
↓	Brodnica	Mazurian Tower	beginning of 14th century	part of the city fortifications	
↑	Cielęta (hist. in Michałów Land) (Gmina Brodnica)	St. Nicholas church	1st half of 14th century	changes in 1783	
↓	Gorczenica (hist. in Michałów Land) (Gmina Brodnica)	Exaltation of the Holy Cross church	14th century	decorated eastern gable; steeple looks newer	
↑	Chełmno	Church of the Assumption of the Blessed Virgin Mary	1290–1333	hall church	
↓	Chełmno	Sts. Peter and Paul	built in 13th century, altered in 14th	former Dominican church, basilica	
↑	Chełmno	Sts. James and Nicholas	built in 13th and 14th century	former Franciscan church, hall church	
↓	Chełmno	Former Cistercian Nunnery	13th–14th century	with presumed Teutonic Knights fortifications	
↑	Chełmno	Mestwin Tower	2nd half of 13th century	part of the city walls	
↓	Chełmno	Grudziądz Gate	end of 13th century	part of the city walls	
↑	Chełmno	City defensive walls	13th–16th century	almost completely preserved city defensive walls with 23 watchtowers and 1 gate (Mestwin Tower & Grudziądz Gate see above)	
↓	Chełmża	Co-Cathedral Basilica of the Most Holy Trinity	13th–15th century	former cathedral – seat of Bishopric of Chełmno, hall church	
↑	Grzywna (Gmina Chełmża)	St. Catherine of Alexandria church	13th/14th century	renewed; steeple 1906	
↓	Kiełbasin (Gmina Chełmża)	Nativity of the Virgin church	14th/15th centuries	upper parts of the steeple 17th	
↑	Zajączkowo (Gmina Chełmża)	St. John the Baptist church	about 1300	farly deleted in 1856; gate (and windows) of brick in a building of boulders	
↓	Czarnowo (Gm. Zławieś Wielka)	St. Martin church	14th century		
↑	Czarże (Gmina Dąbrowa Chełmińska)	Church of the Nativity of the Blessed Virgin Mary	14th century	alterations 15th & 19th centuries	
↓	Dębowa Łąka (Wąbrzeźno County)	Sts Peter and Paul church	14th century		
↑	Kurkocin (Gmina Dębowa Łąka)	St. Bartholomew church	14th century		
↓	Łobdowo (Gmina Dębowa Łąka)	St. Margaret church [św. Małgorzaty]	1st half of 14th century		
↑	Wielkie Radowiska (Gmina Dębowa Łąka)	St. James church	14th century	alterations in 1558 & end 18th century	
↓	Gardeja (Kwidzyn County)	St. Joseph church	steeple 1330-1340	only steeple original; nave modern	
↑	Czarne Dolne (Gmina Gardeja)	Our Lady of the Rosary church	1320	alterations 1719 and 19th century (western façade)	
↓	Trumieje (Gmina Gardeja)	Christ the King church	14th century	steeple & windows of brick; in 1892 stabilisation of the steeple	
↑	Ostrowite (Gm. Golub-Dobrzyń)	St. Mary Magdalene church	kon. 15th century	lower parts of the walls of brick, Gothic windows, Renaissance gable and steeple	
↓	Wrocki (Gm. Golub-Dobrzyń)	St. Martin church	13th/14th century	restituted in 17th century	
↑	Grudziądz	St. Nicholas church	about 1300	several destructions and restitutions	
↓	Grudziądz	Grudziądz Granaries	since mid 14th century	Historic Monument of Poland	
↑	Grudziądz	Defensive walls	14th/15th century	especially the Water Gate (Brama Wodna)	
↓	Grudziądz	Castle of the Teutonic Order	13th century	already destroyed by wars (Swedish Deluge), most of the ruins were demolished 1796–1804	
↑	Gruta (Grudziądz County)	Church of the Assumption of Mary	14th century	modernized in 1670	
↓	Dąbrówka Królewska (Gmina Gruta)	St. James church	about 1300	decorated eastern gable of brick; steeple 17th century	100
↑	Okonin (Gmina Gruta)	Sts. Cosmas & Damian church	1st half of 14th century		
↓	Kowalewo Pomorskie	St Nicholas church	14th–15th century	alterations in the west about 1900	
↑	Kowalewo Pomorskie	Tower of the defensive walls	14th century	only upper part of brick	
↓	Kowalewo Pomorskie	Castle of the Teutonic Order	1300–1330	sparse relics	
↑	Chełmonie (Gm. Kowalewo Pom.)	St. Bartholomew's church	beginning of 14th century	alterations in 15th & 19th centuries	
↓	Pluskowęsy (Gm. Kowalewo Pom.)	St. John the Baptist and St. Valentine church	14th century	later alterations	
↑	Srebrniki (Gm. Kowalewo Pom.)	Our Lady of the Snow	13th & 14th century	later alterations	
↓	Łasin (Grudziądz County)	St. Catherine church	brick 1320–1328	1568 Renaissance alterations, 1628 burnt in a war, 1710–1719 reconstruction	
↑	Szczepanki (Gmina Łasin)	St Lawrence (Kościół św. Wawrzyńca)	1st half of 14th century	predecessor since 1292; Baroque alterations in 18th century	
↓	Lembarg (Gm. Jabłonowo Pom.)	Sts. Peter & Paul	1st half of 14th century	changes in 1507, 1700, late 18th century; steeple new?	
↑	Linowo (Gm. Świecie n. Osą)	St. Michael church	16th century		
↑	Łopatki (Gmina Książki)	St. Mary Magdalene church	2nd quarter of 14th century	alterations in 1865–1867	
↓	Bierzgłowo (Gmina Łubianka)	Church of the Assumption	13th century/14th century		
↑	Przeczno (Gmina Łubianka)	Church of the Exaltation of the Holy Cross	about 1300	later alterations	
↓	Gronowo (Gmina Lubicz)	St. Nicholas	14th century	alterations in 17th & 18th centuries	
↑	Rogowo (Gmina Lubicz)	Church of the Exaltation of the Holy Cross	13th/14th century		
↓	Papowo Toruńskie (Gmina Łysomice)	Saint Nicholas church	before 1300	steeple 1906/1907	
↑	Swierczynki (Gmina Łysomice)	St. John church	13th/14th century	alterations in 18th and early 18th centuries	
↓	Nowa Wieś Królewska (Gmina Płużnica)	St. John the Baptist church	13th/14th century		
↑	Orzechowo (Gmina Wąbrzeźno)	St. Mary Magdalene church	13th century	alterations in 1685	
↓	Osiek (Brodnica County)	Church of the Assumption	14th century/15th century	changes in 1796	
↑	Papowo Biskupie	Saint Nicholas Church		tower modern simple substitute	
↓	Radzyń Chełmiński (Grudziądz County)	Radzyń Chełmiński Castle	first brick 1270–1285, rebuilt 1310–1330	since 1242 wooden, 1278 destroyed by Prussian revolt, since 1772 dismantled in various steps	
↑	Radzyń Chełmiński (Grudziądz County)	Saint Anne church	1310–1600		
↓	Radzyń Chełmiński (Grudziądz County)	Saint George Chapel	about 1340	alterations in 15th century and 1851	
↑	Sarnowo (Chełmno County)	St. Martin Church	14th or 15th century		
↓	Szynwałd (Grudziądz County)	Nativity of the Virgin Mary	14th century	reconstruction after war of 1453–1466, further alterations in 17th, 18th & 19th centuries	
↑	Toruń	Cathedral of St. John the Baptist and St. John the Evangelist	14th and 15th century	former parish church of Toruń's Old Town	
↓	Toruń	St. Mary's Church	1350-1370	former Franciscan hall church, with some alterations in late 18th century (roof over nave and western gable)	
↑	Toruń	St. James's church	1309-about 1340	Parish church of Toruń's New Town, basilica, one of the most sophisticatedly decorated Gothic brick churches	
↓	Toruń	Old Town City Hall	13th–14th century, rebuilt in 17th century	The oldest town hall tower in Central-Eastern Europe in the type of Flemish belfries	
↑	Toruń	House no. 15 Kopernika Str.	15th century	one of the best examples of Gothic brick houses in Northern Europe	
↓	Toruń	Several other particular houses	13th to 15th century		
↓	Toruń	"House of the Landlords"	from 1489	club of advanced citizens; built of brick from the destroyed Teutonic Knights' Castle	
↑	Toruń	Teutonic Knights' castle	13th – early 15th century	one of the earliest Teutonic Knights' castles in Chełmno Land, demolished by citizens of Toruń in 1454	
↓	Toruń	City defensive walls with gates and watchtowers	Half of 14th century to early 16th century	one of the oldest and finest examples of city walls in Poland	
↑	Toruń	Dybów Castle	1424–1428	Polish border castle on the opposite (southern) side of Vistula river, historically outside the Land of Chełmno	
↓	Trzebcz Szlachecki (Gm. Kijewo Król.)	Church of St. Mary's Assumption	14th century	inside simplified reconstruction in 18th century; eastern brick gable above boulders wall	
↑	Wielkie Czyste (Gmina Stolno)	St. Catherine of Alexandria Church	13th century		
↑	Unisław (Chełmno County)	St. Bartholomew church	end 13th century	additions in 1841	
↑	Zieleń (Gmina Ryńsk)	Sts. Peter & Paul church	14th/15th century	later alterations	
↑	Żmijewo (Gmina Zbiczno)	St. James	about 1330	very much renewed in 1935	

Land of Chełmno ⬆ : Bobrowo • Brodnica • Chełmno • Chełmza • Chełmża • Dębowa Łąka • Grudziądz • Kowalewo Porskie • Radzyń Chełmiński • Toruń

Navigation: W.POM • GDA.POM • CHŁM • WAR+MAS+POW • GR-PL+KUJ+LĘC • MAZ • LUBU • EAST • SIL • LESS.PL

== Warmia, Masuria and Powiśle ==
– Territory of the Old Prussians, conquered by the Teutonic Order in the 13th and 14th centuries, since 1454/1466 part of Poland (Warmia and part of Powiśle directly, remainder as a fief) –

Barciany • Bartoszyce • Biskupiec • Bisztynek • Frombork • Korsze • Kwidzyn • Malbork • Olsztyn • Prabuty • Reszel

↕	Place	Building	Main period of construction	Special features	Image
↑	Barciany (Kętrzyn County)	Barciany Castle	late 14th century		
↑	Barciany (Kętrzyn County)	Church of the Immaculate Heart of Mary	14th/15th century	alterations in 18th & 19th centuries	
↑	Asuny (Gmina Barciany)	Church of the Assumption	15th century	alterations in 1914; since 1958 Greek Catholic	
↑	Drogosze (Gmina Barciany)	Our Lady of the Gate of Dawn	late 14th, 15th century	eastern gable original, but most of the building a substitute, built 1589–1593	
↓	Mołtajny (Gmina Barciany)	St. Anne church (also St. Mary – Matki Boskiej Anielskiej)	14th & 16th century		
↑	Winda (Gmina Barciany)	St. Mary Help church (M. B. Nieustającej Pomocy)	15th century	alterations in 19th century	
↓	Barczewo (Olsztyn County)	Sts. Anne & Steven church	14th century	alterations in 16th & 17th centuries	
↑	Bartąg (Gmina Stawiguda)	St. John church	1348	rebuilt in 1724	
↓	Bartoszyce	St. John the Evangelist	14th–15th century		
↑	Bartoszyce	St. John the Baptist	15th century	predecessor	
↓	Bartoszyce	Lidzbark Gate	1468	later alterations	
↑	Galiny (Gmina Bartoszyce)	Church of St. Mary's Assumption	1350 & 1500 (steeple)	alterations by renovation in 19th century	
↓	Grzęda (Gmina Bartoszyce)	St. Michael church	15th century	Baroque 18th century, western part 1889	
↑	Łabędnik (Gmina Bartoszyce)	Our Lady of Victory church	14th/15th century	later alterations	
↓	Sokolica (Gmina Bartoszyce)	St. Anne	14th century		
↑	Biskupiec (Olsztyn County)	St. John the Baptist	since 1505	predecessor of 1395 destroyed in 1414	
↓	Lipinki (Gmina Biskupiec)	Sts. Peter and Paul church	1339	alterations in 17th century	
↑	Ostrowite (Gmina Biskupiec)	St. James the Greater Church	1330	probable alterations	
↓	Łąkorz (Gmina Biskupiec)	Saint Nicholas church	mid 14th century	alterations in baroque & Rococo	
↑	Paluzy (Gmina Bisztynek)	Church of the Bearing Mary (Narodzenia NMP)	1409 or 2nd half of 14th century	enlargement in 1890	
↓	Sątopy (Gmina Bisztynek)	St. Judoc church	14th century	alterations in 1884-1886	
↑	Sułowo (Gmina Bisztynek)	Holy Cross church (Św. Krzyża)	1380–1400 & 1500	eastern gable of brick, other walls mostly of boulders; 19th century alterations	
↓	Unikowo (Gmina Bisztynek)	St. John the Baptist church	15th century		
↑	Wozławki (Gmina Bisztynek)	St. Anthony church	1370–1380		
↓	Braniewo	St. Catherine		badly damaged in World War II, rebuilt afterwards	
↑	Braniewo	Holy Trinity church	1st half of 15th century	alterations in 1583/84, 1681,19th century	
↓	Żelazna Góra (Gmina Braniewo)	Holy Family church	1st half of 16th century		
↑	Dobre Miasto	Collegial Church	14th century		
↓	Dźwierzuty (Szczytno County)	Evangelical church	steeple 14th century	nave after fire of 1691	
↑	Elbląg	St. Nicholas Cathedral	13th & 15th century	in 15th century converted from basilica to hall church; burnt effigy in 1945, rebuilt 1969–1989	
↓	Przezmark (Gmina Elbląg)	Exaltation of the Holy Cross church	mid 14th century	alterations in 1901/02	
↑	Fiszewo (Gmina Gronowo Elbląskie)	Old church	1380	1754, 1897 alterations, since 1945 in ruins	
↓	Frombork	Cathedral	1343–1383	Bishopric of Warmia	
↑	Frombork	St. Nicholas church	1461–1507	predecessor destroyed in the Thirteen Years' War	
↓	Frombork	Holy Ghost hospital	1426–1433	nowadays a museum for the history of medicine	
↑	Frombork	Cathedral Castle		Bell tower; West gate; Copernicus tower	
↓	Górowo Iławeckie (Bartoszyce County)	Exaltation of the Holy Cross church	1367	later alterations	
↑	Grodziczno (Nowe Miasto County)	Sts. Peter and Paul church	about 1500	predecessors since 1340	
↓	Iława	Church of the Transfiguration	1317–1325	steeple 1550, Renaissance	
↑	Jeziorany (Olsztyn County)	St. Barthomomew church	2nd half 14th century	alterations in 1912	
↓	Tłokowo (Gmina Jeziorany)	St. John the Baptist church	14th century	alterations around 1500	
↑	Radostowo (Gmina Jeziorany)	St. George church	14th/15th century	alterations in 19th century	
↓	Jonkowo (Olsztyn County)	St. John the Baptist church	1350-1375 and late 16th century	much lost by alterations in 19th century	
↑	Wrzesina (Gmina Jonkowo)	Mary Magdalene church	about 1500	later alterations	
↓	Nowe Kawkowo (Gmina Jonkowo)	St. John the Evangelist	14th century		
↑	Kętrzyn	St. George's Church	14th century		
↓	Kętrzyn	Kętrzyn Castle	1345–1348	1797 destroyed by fire, since 1912 simplified reconstruction as an apartment house	
↑	Czerniki (Gmina Kętrzyn)	St. John the Evangelist church	14th century	alterations in 18th century	
↓	Kisielice (Iława County)	Regina Mundi church	14th century	alterations in 17th century	
↑	Kolno (Olsztyn County)	Church of the Epiphany	about 1400		
↓	Garbno (Gmina Korsze)	Our Lady Queen of Poland church	1st half of 15th century	nave rebuilt in 1824	
↑	Kraskowo (Gmina Korsze)	Our Lady of Częstochowa Church	15th century		
↓	Łankiejmy (Gmina Korsze)	St. John the Baptist church	14th/15th century	gables & steeple of brick; windows and parts of the steeple 19th century	
↑	Parys (Gmina Korsze)	Our Lady of Help church	14th century	alterations in 17th century	
↓	Sątoczno (Gmina Korsze)	Christ the King church	14th/15th century	alterations in 1839–1842	
↑	Tołkiny (Gmina Korsze)	St. Mary in the Dawn church	14th/15th century		
↓	Kuty (Gmina Pozezdrze)	St. Maximilian Maria Kolbe church	1576–1586	very much restored in 1973/1974	
↑	Kwidzyn	Kwidzyn Castle	1344–1355	Historic Monument of Poland	
↓	Kwidzyn	Cathedral	1343–1384	Historic Monument of Poland	
↑	Rakowiec (Gmina Kwidzyn)	St. Anthony church	14th/15th century	alterations in 1725 & 1893	
↓	Leszcz (Gmina Dąbrówno)	Holy Trinity church	14th century	building of boulders with windows an edges of brick; alterations in 18th century	
↑	Lichnowy (Malbork County)	Church of Saint Ursula	14th/15th century	alterations in 1894	
↓	Lidzbark Warmiński	Lidzbark Castle		one of the earliest brick buildings in the area, Historic Monument of Poland	
↑	Lubawa (Iława County)	Sts. Mary and Anne church	(1330), 1533–1547	alterations in 1600	
↓	Lukta (Ostróda County)	Our Lady of Częstochowa church	1407	steeple 19th century	
↑	Malbork	Malbork Castle	1276 to late 14th century	Teutonic Knights' castle, largest non-religious Brick Gothic structure, headquarter of the Teutonic Order 1309–1455.	
↓	Malbork	St. John the Baptist's Church	1467–1523		
↑	Malbork	Town Hall	1365–1380		
↓	Malbork	Latin school	1352	nowadays in ruins	
↑	Malbork	City fortifications	14th century	St. Mary's gate; Potters' gate; "Buttermilk Tower" (Baszta Maślankowa)	
↓	Miłakowo (Ostróda County)	Sts. Elisabeth of Hungary & Adalbert of Prague church	1320–1350	alterations in 19th century	
↑	Milejewo (Elbląg County)	St. Stanislaus church	1380–1389	alterations in 1639 & 1856–1860	
↓	Młynary (Elbląg County)	St. Peter church	14th & 16th century	Baroque alterations, nave hence plastered	
↑	Morąg (Ostróda County)	Sts. Peter & Paul church	1305–1312		
↓	Narzym (Gmina Iłowo-Osada)	St. John the Baptist church	15th century		
↑	Nidzica	Nidzica Castle	14th and 15th century	Teutonic Knights' castle	
↓	Nowe Miasto Lubawskie	St. Thomas church	1330		
↑	Nowe Miasto Lubawskie	Lubawa Gate Tower (Baszta Bramy Lubawskiej)	14th–16th centuries		
↓	Olsztyn	Olsztyn Castle	2nd half of 14th century	Teutonic Castle; in 15th and 16th century rebuilt to be a palace; Historic Monument of Poland	
↑	Olsztyn	Co-Cathedral Basilica of St. James	before 1445	Late Gothic hall church	
↓	Olsztyn	St. Lawrence Church	consecrated in 1500		
↑	Olsztyn	Old Town Hall	2nd half of 14th century	later alterations	
↓	Olsztyn	High Gate	14th century		
↑	Orneta	Cathedral of St. John	14th and 15th centuries	basilica	
↓	Orneta	Town Hall	1375	alterations in 17th and 18th centuries	
↑	Pasłęk	St. Bartholomew	about 1350	massive alterations in 18th century	
↓	Pieniężno	Capitular Castle of Warmia	1414	in 17th century changed into Baroque and plastered; since 1945 ruins	
↑	Pieniężno	Town hall	14th/15th century	very much altered in 17th century	
↓	Pluty (Gmina Pieniężno)	St. Lawrence church	2nd half of 14th century	alterations in 1801	
↑	Radziejewo (Gmina Pieniężno)	St. Anthony church	16th century	many alterations in 1716 & 1840	
↓	Płoskinia (Braniewo County)	St. Catharine church	1340–1360	Baroque alterations in 17th century, steeple in 1881	
↑	Prabuty	St. Adalbert	14th century		
↓	Prabuty	Saint Mary chapel	1387–1409	called "the Polish church"	
↑	Prabuty	Castle of the Bishops of Pomesania	2nd half of 13th century	ancient relics and a recent reconstruction beside	
↓	Prabuty	Kwidzyń Gate	14th century		
↑	Reszel	Reszel Castle	1350–1401	later alterations	
↓	Reszel	Sts. Peter & Paul church	1348–1402	hall church	
↑	Reszel	"High" bridge			
↓	Jelonki (Gmina Rychliki)	Sacred Heart church (Serca Pana Jezusa)	14th century	alterations mid 19th century	
↑	Kwietniewo (Gmina Rychliki)	Exaltation of the Holy Cross church	1330–1350, 1536–1541	alterations in 18th century	
↓	Święty Gaj (Gmina Rychliki)	St. Anthony	15th century	alterations in 1878 and recently – the upper part of the gable is a young replica	
↑	Sampława (Gmina Lubawa)	St. Bartholomew	1330		
↓	Sępopol (Bartoszyce County)	St. Michael church	1360–1370 (–1450)	16th century alterations	
↑	Dzietrzychowo (Gmina Sępopol)	Mother of God church (Matkej Boskiej)	15th century	decorated brick gable ona nave of boulders; 17th century alterations	
↓	Lwowiec (Gmina Sępopol)	Our Lady of the Scapular church	1370–1374	alterations in 1870	
↑	Srokowo (Kętrzyn County)	Holy Cross church	1409	alterations in 17th century	
↓	Tolkmicko (Elbląg County)	St. James church	15th century	transept 1901/1902	
↑	Ostróda	Dominic Savio church	14th century		
↓	Pasym (Szczytno County)	Evangelical church	15th/16th century		
↑	Piotraszewo (Gmina Dobre Miasto)	St. Bartholomew church	1580		
↓	Purda (Olsztyn County)	St. Michael church	late 16th century		
↑	Klewki (Gmina Purda)	St. Valentin church (św. Walentego)	1481		
↓	Różynka (Gmina Świątki)	Saint Matthew church	1604–1606	alterations in 18th century	
↑	Pierzchały (Gmina Płoskinia)	St. Margaret church	1330–1341		
↓	Sząbruk (Gmina Gietrzwałd)	St. Michael church	15th century	later alterations	
↑	Sztum	Sztum Castle	early 14th century	destructions in 1683 and 1945	
↓	Postolin (Gmina Sztum)	Our Lady of the Scapular	14th century	hall church; steeple 1867-1869	
↑	Susz (Iława County)	St. Anthony	1340–1350		
↑	Wilczęta (Braniewo County)	Church of the Transfiguration	1330–1350	alterations in 1665 & 1718	
↑	Boreczno (Gmina Zalewo)	Exaltation of the Holy Cross	1330	edges, windows and a steeple of brick on a building mainly of boulders; alterations in 1632	
↑	Dobrzyki (Gmina Zalewo)	Sts. Peter and Paul church	1320–1330	choir Gothic, nave 17th century	

Warmia, Masuria and Powiśle ⬆ : Barciany • Bartoszyce • Biskupiec • Bisztynek • Frombork • Korsze • Kwidzyn • Malbork • Olsztyn • Prabuty • Reszel

Navigation: W.POM • GDA.POM • CHŁM • WAR+MAS+POW • GR-PL+KUJ+LĘC • MAZ • LUBU • EAST • SIL • LESS.PL

== Greater Poland, Kujawy & Łęczyca ==
Bydgoszcz • Gniezno • Kalisz • Mogilno • Poznań • Żnin

↕	Place	Building	Main period of construction	Special features	Image
↓	Będków (Tomaszow County)	Church of the Nativity of St. Mary	1462		
↓	Bielawy (Łowicz County)	Church of the Visitation	1403, 1531	1929/1930 intensively restored	
↓	Sobota (Gmina Bielawy)	Sts. Peter & Paul church	1518		
↓	Borysławice Zamkowe	Borysławice Zamkowe Castle	c. 1425	destroyed by Swedish forces during the Deluge, currently in ruins	
↑	Bratoszewice (Gmina Stryków)	St. Augustine church	end 15th century	massively renewed in 1898–1901	
↓	Brześć Kujawski	St. Stanislaus Church	after 1332, 15th century	hall church, rebuilt in 1710 (Baroque), Gothic Revival in early 19th c. & 1908–1909. Only parts of external walls are original.	
↓	Brudzew (Turek County)	St. Nicholas church	1455	Baroque alterations	
↑	Bydgoszcz	Bernardine Church of Our Lady Queen of Peace	1552–1557	Late Gothic, aisleless	
↑	Bydgoszcz	St. Martin and St. Nicholas Cathedral	1425–1502	Late Gothic, hall church	
↓	Bydgoszcz	White Granary (Biały Spichlerz)	15th century	above ground of framework, basement with Gothic vaults	
↑	Ceradz Kościelny (Gmina Tarnowo Podgórne)	St. Stanisłaus church	1st half of 16th century	presbytery in 1550–1575, western part in 1713	
↓	Chojnica	(with proviso:) St. John the Baptist church	1531	ruins since 19th century, probably originally plastered	
↑	Dębno (Gmina Nowe Miasto nad Wartą)	Church of the Assumption of St. Mary	13th century (?)		
↓	Domaniew (Gmina Dalików)	St. Florian church	16th century		
↑	Drzewica (Opoczno County)	St. Luke church	1460	Gothic revival restoration in 1914, keeping old parts, esp. the round steeple	
↓	Gniewkowo (Inowrocław County)	Sts. Nicholas and Constantina church	14th century	alterations in 1871	
↑	Gniezno	Cathedral	1342–1415, northern tower 1512	rebuilt in 18th century (Baroque-Neoclassical), after WW II restored in presumable Gothic forms	
↓	Gniezno	Sts. Mary and Antony Church		only the steeple still of visible brick	
↑	Gniezno	Church of St. John the Baptist	mid 14th century	most medieval structures replaced in18th/19th century	
↓	Gniezno	St. Lawrence church	15th century	nave nowadays baroque	
↑	Gniezno	St. Michael church	beginning of 15th century	restored after 1613, most medieval structures replaced in 1815 and later, nowadays a typical Gothic Revival building	
↓	Gniezno	Holy Trinity Church	1420–1430	after 1613 rebuilt in Baroque style	
↑	Gosławice (Konin)	Gosławice Castle	1414–1420	only the defensive walls still show brick	
↓	Gostyń	St. Margaret's Church	14th century		
↑	Grabie (Gm. Aleksandrów Kuj.)	St. Wenceslaus	1320, 1597	alterations in 2nd half of 16th century	
↓	Inowrocław	St. Nicholas church	15th century	massive Baroque alterations	
↑	Izbica Kujawska (Włocławek County)	Church of the Assumption of St. Mary	15th century	alterations in early 20th century	
↓	Jarocin	Holy Ghost church	1516	ruins since 1856	
↑	Jaszkowo (Gmina Brodnica)	St. Barbara Church	15th century		
↓	Kalinowa (Gmina Błaszki)	St. Mary Magdalene Church	1465/1466	massive Baroque alterations	
↑	Kalisz	Cathedral of St. Nicholas the Bishop	mid 13th century	many Baroque & Gothic revival alterations	
↓	Kalisz	St. Stanislas Church	14th century	alterations 1537/1539 to 1599–1632	
	Kalisz	Defensive walls	14th century		
↑	Kamionna	St. Mary church	1499		
↓	Kazimierz Biskupi (Konin County)	St. Martin church	stone 12th century, brick stone around 1512	Baroque alterations	
↑	Kaźmierz	St. Mary church	1494		
↓	Bytyń (Gmina Kaźmierz)	Church of the Immaculate Conception	1534	alterations in 1608	
↑	Kleczew (Konin County)	St. Andrew church	14th & 15th or 16th century		
↓	Kobylin (Krotoszyn County)	St. Stanislaus church	consecrated 1518		
↑	Koło	Church of the Exaltation of the Holy Cross	14th–15th century	hall church	
↓	Koło	Koło Castle	before 1362	destroyed by Swedish-Brandenburgian forces during the Deluge	
↑	Konin	St. Bartholomew Church	14th century	Renaissance alterations	
↓	Koronowo (Bydgoszcz County)	Basilica of the Assumption	14th century	Cistercian monastery, 1687 massive Baroque alterations	
↑	Koronowo (Bydgoszcz County)	St. Andrew Church	consecrated 14th century	Renaissance alterations 16th century	
↓	Kościan	Church of the Assumption	end 14th & 15th century	alterations 1615-1620	
↑	Kościan	Church of Holy Ghost	2nd half of 15th century	Renaissance alterations	
↓	Kostrzyn (Poznań County)	Sts. Peter & Paul church	16th century	alterations in 18th century	
↑	Krerowo	St. John the Baptist Church	16th century		
↓	Kruszwica	Kruszwica Castle	1350–1355	destroyed by Swedish-Brandenburgian forces during the Deluge, only "Mouse Tower" preserved	
↑	Krzywiń (Kościan County)	St. Michael the Bishop church	15th century	new ceiling in 1824	
↓	Łęczyca	Łęczyca Castle	1357–1370	mostly dismantled in 19th century, partially rebuilt after 1964 with considerable reconstructions	
↑	Lubiń (Kościan County)	Abbey church of the Nativity of St. Mary	15th–16th century	rebuilt in 18th century in Baroque style, Historic Monument of Poland	
↓	Lubiń (Kościan County)	St. Leonard church	Gothic 1549–1556	Benedictine; Romanesque 13th century; Mannerist end 16th century, Historic Monument of Poland	
↑	Lwówek (Nowy Tomyśl County)	Church of the Assumption of the Blessed Virgin Mary and St. John the Baptist and St. John the Evangelist	2nd half of 15 century	hall church, shorter 4th nave, inside Baroque alterations	
↓	Mogilno	St. James church	finished 1511	later alterations	
↑	Mogilno	St. John the Evangelist church	13th–16th century	Benedictine Monastery in Mogilno; outside altered to Rococo (18th c.)	
↓	Gębice (Gmina Mogilno)	St. Matthew church	15th/16th century	alterations 1768−1772 to Baroque, 1862−1874 back to Gothic	
↑	Kwieciszewo (Gmina Mogilno)	St. Mary Magdalene church	1522	mixture of Gothic & Renaissance style	
↓	Murowana Goślina (Poznań County)	St. James church	Gothic parts about 1500	western section Romanesque of stone, eastern section & gable Brick Gothic, presbytery 1717	
↑	Nieszawa (Aleksandrów County)	St. Hedwig of Silesia Church	15th century		
↓	Nowe Miasto nad Wartą (Środa County)	Holy Trinity church	17th century	hall church	
↑	Oborniki	Church of St. Mary's Assumption	15th/16th century	after fires in 1655, 1757 & 1814 outside only buttresses of visible brick, inside Baroque	
↓	Oporów	Oporów Castle	1434–1449	built for Władysław Oporowski, Bishop of Kujawy and Archbishop of Gniezno	
↑	Orłów (Gmina Bedlno)	Corpus Christi church	1430		
↓	Sobótka (Gm. Ostrów Wpl.)	Church of St. Mary & St. Joseph	end of 13th century	Baroque alterations in 1783–1790	
↑	Wysocko Wielkie (Gm. Ostrów Wpl.)	Exaltation of the Holy Cross church	16th century	Baroque alterations in 17th & 18th centuries	
↓	Ostrzeszów	Church of the Assumption of St. Mary	13th century, choir 1337		
↑	Ostrzeszów	Castle tower	14th century	since 1785, the castle has fallen in ruins	
↓	Owińska (Gmina Czerwonak)	St. Nicholas church	mid 16th century	Baroque alterations	
↑	Pepowo (Gostyń County)	St. Hedwig church	15th century	steeple and parts of the nave 1830, Gothic Revival	
↓	Piotrków Trybunalski	Royal Castle	1512–1519	Gothic-Renaissance	
↑	Piotrków Trybunalski	St. James Church	14th–15th centuries	visible brick: steeple and eastern gable; pseudo-basilica	
↓	Pniewy (Szamotuły County)	St. Lawrence church	1405	rebuilt after fires of 1635 and 1772	
↑	Poznań	Basilica of St. Peter and St. Paul	14th and 15th century	Pre-Romanesque and Romanesque predecessors, thoroughly rebuilt in late 18th century, after damage in WW II reconstructed in presumable Gothic forms	
↓	Poznań	Corpus Christi church	1406, 1465–1470	church founded by Jogaila, partially rebuilt in 18th century, pseudo-basilica	
↑	Poznań	Royal Castle	mainly after 1434	after long decay, nowadays almost all is a reconstruction	
↓	Poznań	House of Psalterists	1518	building founded by Jan Lubrański, bishop of Poznań	
↑	Poznań	St. Mary's Church in summo	1431–1448	hall church; the first church was founded by Dobrawa of Bohemia in 965	
↓	Poznań	defensive walls	since 13th century	preserved parts intensively reconstructed	
↑	Pobiedziska (Poznań metropolitan area)	St. Michael church	14th century	later alterations	
↓	Pszczonów (Gmina Maków)	St. Dorothy & All Saints church	16th–19th century	Gothic, Renaissance, Gothic Revival	
↑	Radziejów	Church of the Assumption of St. Mary	1331	modernized in 16th century; 1860–1864 rebuilt with massive alterations	
↓	Radziejów	Church of the Holy Cross	14th century	rebuilt after fires in 1657 & 1704, the only visible Gothic relic is the eastern portal	
↑	Rogoźno (Oborniki County)	St. Vitus church	1526		
↓	Russocice (Gmina Władysławów)	St. Michael church	early 16th century	Baroque alterations in 1694	
↑	Sieradz	Collegiate Church	1370	rebuilt in 17th century in Baroque style, pseudo-basilica	
↓	Sieradz	St. Stanislas church	about 1380	Baroque alterations in 18th century; Gothic portal preserved	
↑	Śrem	St. Mary's Church	15th century	steeple from 16th century	
↓	Śrem	Holy Ghost church	late 16th century (some parts possibly older)		
↑	Środa Wielkopolska	Collegiate church of the Assumption of St. Mary	15th century	partially rebuilt in 16th century (attic)	
↓	Stary Gostyń	St. Martin church	about 1300	overshoot restoration in 19th century	
↑	Strzelno (Mogilno County)	Holy Trinity Church	consecrated in 1216	Gothic star vaults with ribs of brick; whole church from Romanesque to Baroque; Norbertine monastery	
↓	Sulejów (Piotrków County)	Chapter house of Sulejów Abbey	mid 13th century		
↑	Szadek (Zduńska Wola County)	Church of St. Mary's Assumption & St. James	1333–1335	rebuilt mid 16th century and restored in 1868 & 1905	
↓	Szamotuły	Collegiate church	1423–1430		
↑	Szamotuły	Watchtower Baszta Halszki	15th century	relic of a ducal castle	
↓	Tomice (Gmina Stęszew)	St. Barbara church	1463	alterations in 18th century	
↑	Trląg (Gmina Janikowo)	Sts. Peter and Paul church	14th century	predecessors from 11th/12th centuries	
↓	Tulce (Gmina Kleszczewo)	Assumption of St. Mary	mid 13th, 15th, 16th ... century	oldest brick building in Greater Poland; originally Romanesque, Gothic and further alterations	
↑	Tum (Gmina Góra Świętej Małgorzaty)	Collegiate church	brick stone 15th century	Gothic alterations of a Romanesque stone building; further alterations in 18th century	
↓	Uniejów (Poddębice County)	Archbishop Castle	1360–1365 & since 1525	wooden predecessor destroyed in 1331, first brick building destroyed by a fire in 1525	
↑	Uniejów (Poddębice County)	Church of the Assumption of St. Mary	mid 14th century		
↓	Wągrowiec	St. James church	16th century		
↑	Warzymowo (Gmina Skulsk)	St. Stanislaus church	3rd quarter of 16 century	wooden predecessor; Gothic with Renaissance elements	
↓	Wieluń	Cracow Gate (Brama Krakowska)	14th century	in 19th century adapted for the town hall	
↑	Wilczyn (Konin County)	St. Ursula church	1566	very late Gothic	
↓	Włocławek	Cathedral of St. Mary of the Assumption	14th and 15th century	extensively rebuilt and altered 1883–1901 in Gothic Revival style	Wlocławek Cathedral
↑	Włocławek	St. Vitalis Church	1330–1411		
↓	Września	St. Mary's and St. Stan's Church		only tower still Gothic, burnt during the Swedish Deluge in 1655, rebuilt with alterations in 1672 and 1792	
↑	Żerniki (Gm. Janowiec Wpl.)	Bearing St. Mary church	1467		
↑	Żnin	St. Florian church	14th/15th century	later alterations	
↑	Żnin	St. Martin Church	13th–15th century	later alterations	
↑	Żnin	Town hall tower	1447–1500	alterations in 1692	
↑	Cerekwica (Gmina Żnin)	St. Michael church	13th/14th/15th century (?)	important Gothic portal; massive alterations in 1850	

Greater Poland, Kujawy & Łęczyca ⬆ : Bydgoszcz • Gniezno • Kalisz • Mogilno • Poznań • Żnin

Navigation: W.POM • GDA.POM • CHŁM • WAR+MAS+POW • GR-PL+KUJ+LĘC • MAZ • LUBU • EAST • SIL • LESS.PL

== Mazovia and Dobrzyń Land ==
Navigation Mazowia: Warsaw (Warszawa)

↕	Place	Building	Main period of construction	Special features	Image
↓	Brochów (Sochaczew County)	Fortified Church of St. Roch and St. John the Baptist	1551–1561, 1596	Gothic-Renaissance church established by Jan Brochowski and his family as a three-nave church with three side towers	
↓	Ciechanów	Ciechanów Castle	14th century	Masovian Dukes castle, destroyed by Swedish-Brandenburgian forces during the Deluge, currently in ruins	
↓	Ciechanów	St. Mary's Church	early 16th century	late gothic pseudo-basilica, alteraded restoration after the Deluge	
↓	Czersk	Czersk Castle	1388–1410	Masovian Dukes castle, destroyed by Swedish-Brandenburgian forces during the Deluge, currently in ruins	
↑	Czerwińsk	Abbey Church	12th century	Romanesque, the façade was rebuilt in gothic style in the second half of 15th century	
↓	Czerwińsk	Gate of Abbot Kula	1457		
↑	Dziektarzewo (Gmina Baboszewo)	St. Catharine church	mid 15th century	alterations in 18th and 19th centuries	
↓	Giżyce (Gmina Sochaczew)	Sts. Peter and Paul church	1439		
↑	Gołymin-Ośrodek (Ciechanow County)	St. John the Baptist church	155h/16th century	19th century alterations	
↓	Grójec	St. Nicholas Church	1398 & 1520–1530	already more Renaissance than Gothic elements	
↑	Łęg Probostwo (Gmina Drobin)	St. Catherine church	1409 & 16th century		
↓	Lipno	Assumption of St. Mary Church	1388		
↑	Liw	Liw Castle	before 1429	Masovian Dukes castle, destroyed by Swedish-Brandenburgian forces during the Deluge, currently in ruins	
↓	Łomża	Cathedral of St. Michael the Archangel	1504–1525	Late Masovian Gothic	
↑	Łowicz	Holy Ghost Church	1404	alterations in 17th and 19th centuries	
↓	Maków Mazowiecki	Corpus Christi (or St. Joseph) church	1490–1511	alterations in 18th century	
↑	Nowe Miasto (Płońsk County)	Holy Trinity church	end 14th century	rebuilt after destruction of 1655	
↓	Piaseczno	St. Anna church		very late Gothic	
↑	Płock	Płock Castle	14th century	Masovian Dukes castle	
↓	Płock	Płock Cathedral towers	13th–14th century	Romanesque cathedral, rebuilt several times	
↑	Przasnysz	Church of St. Jacob and St. Anne	1588–1618	considered to be the last gothic church in Poland	
↓	Pułtusk	Tower of the city hall	15th–16th centuries	several periods of construction	
↑	Pułtusk	Defensive walls	since 1508	several periods of construction	
↓	Radomin (Golub-Dobrzyń County)	St. Nicholas church	14th century	alterations in 18th/19th centuries	
↑	Rawa Mazowiecka	Rawa Mazowiecka Castle	14th century	Masovian Dukes castle, destroyed by Swedish-Brandenburgian forces during the Deluge, currently in ruins	
↓	Rypin	Holy Trinity church	century	alterations, massive renovations in 1821, 1825, 1840 & 1865	
↑	Sierpc	Sts. Vitus, Modest & Crescentius Church	1449	only steeple of brick	
↓	Sierpc	Holy Ghost Church	1483	baroquized reconstruction after destruction by fire	
↑	Warsaw (Warszawa)	St. John's Archcathedral	14th century	completely destroyed by German artillery during the Warsaw Uprising, rebuilt 1947–1957 in Masovian Brick Gothic	
↓	Warsaw (Warszawa)	St. Mary's Church	1410–1411	completely destroyed by German artillery during WW II, rebuilt 1947–1966	
↑	Warsaw (Warszawa)	Warsaw Barbican	1548	reconstructed 1952–1954	
↑	Warsaw (Warszawa)	Bridge Gate	1584, additions in 18th century	Gothic-renaissance gate.	
↑	Wyszogród (Płock County)	Our Lady of the Angels church	early 15th century	most of the present building from 17th century	
↑	Złotoria	Złotoria Castle	1343	now ruins, one of the two Polish border strongholds near Toruń	

Navigation Mazowia: Warsaw (Warszawa)

Mazovia and Dobrzyń Land ⬆ : Warsaw (Warszawa)

Navigation Poland: W.POM • GDA.POM • CHŁM • WAR+MAS+POW • GR-PL+KUJ+LĘC • MAZ • LUBU • EAST • SIL • LESS.PL

== Lubusz Voivodeship ==
– Parts of the historic regions of Lubusz Land, Greater Poland, Lower Silesia and Lower Lusatia –

Place(s) in Lubusz Voivodeship with at least three Brick Gothic buildings: Gubin

↕	Place	Building	Main period of construction	Special features	Image
↓	Chociszewo (Gmina Trzciel)	Birth of St. John the Baptist church	14th/15th century	bell from 1500	
↓	Chociule (Gminia Świebodzin)	St. Catharine church (św. Katarzyny)	16th century		
↓	Dębowa Łęka (Gmina Wschowa) hist. Greater Poland	St. Jadwiga church	15th century		
↓	Dobiegniew	Christ the King church	14th/15th century	steeple 19th century	
↑	Drożków (Gmina Żary)	Holy Cross church	13th century	Gothic windows of brick of 15th century at the tower	
↓	Gorzów Wielkopolski	St. Mary's Cathedral	since end 13th century	hall church, cathedral since 1945	
↑	Gubin (Polish part of Guben)	Town hall		oldest parts in Gothic style and brick	
↓	Gubin (Polish part of Guben)	St. Lawrence church		ruins since 1945	
↑	Gubin (Polish part of Guben)	Ostrowska Gate	1523–1530	originally part of a city gate	
↓	Jędrzychowice (Wschowa County)	St. John (kościół fil. św. Jana z Dukli)		later enlargements	
↑	Kamień Wielki (Gmina Witnica)	St. Anthony church	14th–15th century	south side: portico with Brick Gothic ornamental gable, otherwise mixed masonry	
↓	Lubniewice	St. Mary of the Rosary church	13th, 16th, 17th century	tower Gothic Revival	
↓	Lubsko	Church of the Visitation of St. Mary	brick 15th century	eastern gable of brick, rest of boulders	
↑	Marwice (Gmina Lubiszyn)	Church of the Nativity of St. Mary	13th/14th century	window framings and simple decoration of the gable of brick	
↓	Międzyrzecz	St. John the Baptist church	15th century		
↑	Międzyrzecz	Międzyrzecz Castle	1350 and newer		
↓	Ośno Lubuskie	St. James Church	1298–15th century	hall church	
↑	Ośno Lubuskie	City fortifications			
↓	(With proviso:); Osowa Sień (Gmina Wschowa)	Church of St. Fabian and Sebastian	14th/15th century	brick probably new	
↑	Ostrów (Gmina Sulęcin)	Church of the Bearing Mary	1443	steeple and western section of the nave renewed in 19th century	
↓	Połęcko (Gmina Ośno Lubuskie)	St. Casimir church	15th century	altered in 17th century	
↑	Przyczyna Górna (Gmina Wschowa, hist. Greater Poland)	St. George Church	14th century	17th century additions	
↓	Radoszyn (Gmina Skąpe)	St. Jadwiga Church	16th century	Cistercian; alterations in 17th century and 1882	
↑	Rzepin	Jesus' Heart Church	chapel added in 14th century	combination of brick & stone; the church itself was replaced by a Gothic Revival building in 1879/1880	
↓	Skwierzyna	St. Nicholas church	15th century	hall church	
↑	Siedlnica (Gmina Wschowa, hist. Greater Poland)	Church of the Nativity of St. Mary and St. John the Evangelist	1300 and 1604		
↓	Starosiedle	St. John from the Cross church	early 16th century	alterations in 18th century	
↑	Strzelce Krajeńskie	Our Lady of the Rosary Church	since 1300, 15th century	19th century alterations	
↓	Strzelce Krajeńskie	Defensive walls		walls of boulders, 2 towers of brick: Mill Gate (Brama Młyńska); Baszta Więzienia	
↑	Sulechów	Holy Cross Church	16th century		
↓	Sulęcin	St. Nicholas Church	14th/15th century	aisleless brick church on an older base, tower in 1951 restored a bit simplified	
↑	Świebodzin	Saint Michael Church	15th century & 1541	1855–1856 Gothic Revival façade by Alexis Langer	
↓	Szprotawa (hist. Lower Silesia)	Assumption of St. Mary Church	Gothic 1416–1424	founded in 1260; hall church	
↑	Wschowa (hist. Greater Poland)	St. Stanislaus Church	15th century	baroquified between 1720 and 1726	
↑	Żagań (hist. Lower Silesia)	Assumption of the Blessed Virgin Mary Church		tower Gothic, nave Renaissance	
↑	Żary (hist. Lower Silesia)	Church of Jesus' Heart	1401–1430	predecessor 13th century	
↑	Zielona Góra (hist. Lower Silesia)	Saint Hedwig Cathedral		Renaissance & Baroque changes	

Lubusz Voivodeship ⬆: Gubin

Navigation: W.POM • GDA.POM • CHŁM • WAR+MAS+POW • GR-PL+KUJ+LĘC • MAZ • LUBU • EAST • SIL • LESS.PL

== Eastern Poland ==
– Former Podlachian and Polesian (Brest Litovskian) Voivodeships –

Place	Building	Main period of construction	Special features	Image
Kodeń	Church of the Holy Ghost	1530	Belarusian type of Gothic; built as an Orthodox castle chapel by the later voivode of that time Lithuanian Podlachian Voivodeship	
Supraśl	Orthodox Monastery – Church of the Annunciation	1503–1511	Belarusian type of Gothic; blown up in 1944 by retreating German army, rebuilt since 1985	

Navigation: W.POM • GDA.POM • CHŁM • WAR+MAS+POW • GR-PL+KUJ+LĘC • MAZ • LUBU • EAST • SIL • LESS.PL

== Silesia ==
– Silesian, Opole and Lower Silesian Voivodeships –

Brzeg • Byczyna • Głogów • Góra • Namysłów • Nysa • Gm. Olszanka • Opole • Prudnik • Wrocław

↕	Place	Building	Main period of construction	Special features	Image
↓	Biała (Prudnik County)	Prudnik Gate Tower	15th century		
↓	Biała (Prudnik County)	Church of the Assumption of the Blessed Virgin Mary	14th & 16th centuries	rebuilt after fire	
↓	Bierutów	St. Catherine church	1337, 1603	rebuilt after fire	
↓	Bolesławiec	Basilica of the Assumption and St. Nicholas	13th century	brick decoration of the western gable	
↑	Brzeg	St. Nicholas' Church	1370–1420	restoration of 1958 tried to restore towers as in 1370	
↓	Brzeg	Sts. Peter & Paul Church	13th & 14th centuries	Franciscan; in between destroyed by a fire in 1338	
↑	Brzeg	Brzeg Castle		Piast castle: St. Jadwiga's Church; southwestern tower (altered); most of the castle is Renaissance	
↓	Brzezina (Gmina Miękinia)	St. Mary of the Rosary Church	14th century	after WW II rebuilt in the 1950s	
↑	Byczyna (Kluczbork County)	St. Nicholas church	14th century	alterations in 1790/91; has remained Lutheran since 1945	
↓	Byczyna (Kluczbork County)	St. Hedwig chapel	1383	alterations 1860–1876	
↑	Byczyna (Kluczbork County)	Defensive walls	15th century	with three towers: Polish Tower; German Tower; Southern Tower	
↓	Chojnów (Legnica County)	Sts. Peter & Paul (former St. Mary) church	14th century		
↑	Chojnów (Legnica County)	Weavers' Tower	14th century	part of the defensive walls	
↓	Domaszczyn (Gmina Długołęka)	Exaltation of the Holy Cross Church	about 1520	Baroque alterations	
↑	Łozina (Gmina Długołęka)	Church of the Assumption	15th/16th century		
↓	Stępin (Gmina Długołęka)	Bearing Mary church	15th century		
↑	Dzierżoniów	St. George Church	14th–16th centuries	except of the bell tower and part of the western façade of brick	
↓	Gaworzyce (Polkowice County)	St. Barbara church	steeple 16th century	upper storeys of the steeple of brick	
↑	Gliwice	All Saints church	century	rebuilt after fire of 1711, hall church	
↓	Gliwice	Old Saint Bartholomew's Church	brick 15th century	upper part of the (fortified) tower	
↑	Głogów	Collegiate Church of the Assumption of the Blessed Virgin Mary	Gothic 1413–1466	collegiate	
↓	Głogów	St. Nicholas Church	Gothic since 1291	since 1945 in ruins	
↑	Głogów	St. Lawrence Church	1399–1502	in 1639 damaged by cannon fire, restored in Baroque style	
↓	Głogów	Dukes' Castle	13th–18th centuries	only the donjon; rest of the castle plastered	
↑	Rapocin (Gmina Głogów)	St. Lawrence church	14th/15th century	alterations in 19th century, restoration in 1958	
↓	Głubczyce	Nativity of the Blessed Virgin Mary Church	13th/14th centuries	alterations of the towers in 1579, of the nave in 1903–1907 (transept added)	
↑	Głubczyce	Sts. Fabian & Sebastian chapel	1501		
↓	Gniewomierz (Gmina Legnickie Pole)	St. Anthony church	tower about 1500	tower of boulders with edges and windows of brick	
↑	Góra	St. Catharine Church	1307, 1457–1552	hall church, in 18th century Baroque alterations	
↓	Chróścina (Gmina Góra)	St. Michael church	1483		
↑	Glinka (Gmina Góra)	St. Martin church	15th century		
↓	Osetno (Gmina Góra)	St. Michael church	14th & 2nd half of 15th century	tower 1862	
↑	Stara Góra (Gmina Góra)	St. James church	1450	alterations in 1613	
↓	Grodków (Brzeg County)	St. Michael's Church	late 13th & late 15th ct.	alterations 1671 to Baroque, 1893 back to Gothic	
↑	Grodków (Brzeg County)	Gates of the defensive walls	14th century	Renaissance alterations: Ziębice Gate, only gateway visible brick; Lewin Brzeski Gate, one side visible brick again	
↓	Lipowa (Gmina Grodków)	St. Martin church	15th/16th century		
↑	Młodoszowice (Gmina Grodków)	St. Martin Church	15th/16th century		
↓	Kałków (Gmina Otmuchów)	Church of the Visitation of St. Mary	1210–1260	Romanesque & Gothic	
↑	Karczyce (Gmina Kostomłoty)	Holy Cross church	15th century	17th century Baroque alterations	
↓	Kąty Wrocławskie (Wrocław County)	Sts. Peter & Paul Church	late 15th century	now only one storey of the steeple of visible brick, parts above 1825–1827	
↑	Jaszkotle (Gmina Kąty Wrocławskie)	Church of the Ascension of Christ	1473	windows enlarged in 1732	
↓	Małkowice (Gmina Kąty Wrocławskie)	Holy Trinity church	2nd half 14th century, 1st half 15th century	later alterations	
↑	Sośnica (Gmina Kąty Wrocławskie)	Exaltation of the Cross church	Gothic 1487	alterations in 1619 & 1776	
↓	Kędzierzyn-Koźle	St. Sigismund Church	1323 St. Mary's Chapel	1454 destruction by a fire except of St. Mary's Chapel, new nave until 1570; Gothic Revival alterations	
↑	Kluczbork	Christ the Redeemer church	14th century	later alterations	
↓	Bielany Wrocławskie (Gmina Kobierzyce)	St. Andrew Church	1520–1530		
↑	Tyniec Mały (Gmina Kobierzyce)	Church of the Assumption	1493–1516		
↓	Wierzbice (Gmina Kobierzyce)	Corpus Christi & O. L. Częstochowa church	15th century	18th century alterations	
↑	Kościerzyce (Gmina Lubsza)	Assumption of St. Mary church	14th/15th century		
↓	Krzepice (Kłobuck County)	St. James church	since 1357	Renaissance & Baroque alterations	
↑	Kucharzowice (Gmina Wiązów)	St. Andrew church		later alterations	
↓	Kwielice (Gmina Grębocice)	St. Michel church	15th/16th century		
↑	Legnica	Our Dear Lady's Church	1386	Protestant (Augsburg Confession) parish	
↓	Legnica	Cathedral of Saint Apostles Peter and Paul	1330–1378	wooden predecessor; 1892 original brick walls covered with a skin of new bricks; 1945 re-catholized	
↓	Lubin	God's Mother of Chęstochowa church	14th/15th century	hall church	
↑	Lubin	Castle Chapel	beginning 14th century	modernized in 18th century, after stage of ruins restored in 1908, only western gable of visible brick	
↓	Siedlce (Gmina Lubin)	St. Michael church	14th century		
↑	Lubnów (Gm. Oborniki Śląskie)	Holy Trinity church	15th century	alterations 19th century	
↓	Namysłów	Namysłów Castle			
↑	Namysłów	Sts. Peter & Paul Church			
↓	Namysłów	Kraków Gate (Brama Krakowska)	1390		
↑	Namysłów	St. Francis of Assisi & Peter of Alcantara Church	14th & 15th century	later alterations	
↓	Namysłów	(with provisio:); Town hall	1360	eastern gable Gothic of washed brick, but since renovation of 1838 rather a replique	
↑	Namysłów	Church of the Immaculate Conception	1233		Google Maps
↓	Baldwinowice (Gmina Namysłów)	Holy Trinity Church	brick 1414	presbytery of brick, nave of wood	
↑	Niemodlin (Opole County)	Assumption of St. Mary Church	13th/14th century	only steeple and western façade still Gothic	
↓	Niemodlin (Opole County)	Defensive walls	15th century	boulders with a skin of brick	
↑	Nysa	Basilica of St. James and St. Agnes		some decorations of stone	
↓	Nysa	Evangelical Jesus church	1428	alterations in 18th century & 1810; interim plastered brick decorations recently uncovered	
↑	Nysa	Ziębice Tower	14th century	more storeys added in 16th & 17th century	
↓	Oleśnica	Wrocław Gate	14th century		
↑	Opole	Cathedral	15th century	older predecessors; steeples Gothic Revival	
↓	Opole	Holy Trinity Church		Franciscan church, Baroque alterations	
↑	Opole	Piast Tower	late 13th century	part of the Piasts' Castle, which was demolished in 1931	
↓	Opole	Upper Castle	tower end 14th century	upper storey and pinnacles Gothic Revival	
↑	Czeska Wieś (Gmina Olszanka)	Jesus's Heart church	13th century	18th century alterations	
↓	Gierszowice (Gmina Olszanka)	Our Lady of the Scapular church	about 1300, steeple 1503		
↑	Jankowice Wielkie (Gmina Olszanka)	St. Mary Assumption church	14th/15th century	later alterations	
↓	Pogorzela (Gmina Olszanka)	Jesus's Heart church	14th century		
↑	Paczków (Nysa County)	St. John the Evangelist's Church	1341–1376	several alterations	
↓	Paczków (Nysa County)	Defensive walls		tops of two towers of brick: Brama Wrocławska; Brama Nyska (Nysa Gate)	
↑	Prochowice (Legnica County)	Prochowice Castle	since 14th century	only tower of visible brick	
↓	Prudnik	Prudnik Castle	1255	so-called "Wok's Tower" is now the only remnant of the castle	
↑	Prudnik	Defensive walls	15th century	towers of the defensive walls: Lower Gate Tower; Mała Wieża; Wieża Katowska	
↓	Prusice (Trzebnica County)	Saint James church	1492		
↑	Racibórz	Church of the Holy Ghost	14th century	profanized in 1810, nowadays it houses the municipal museum	
↓	Racibórz	St. James Church	1285	after a fire in 1637 restored in Renaissance and Baroque styles, damages of World War II repaired 1946/47	
↑	Rosochata (Gmina Kunice)	Assumption of St. Mary (kościół Wniebowzięcia NMP)	early 13th century	presbytery newer	
↓	Rudna (Lubin County)	Holy Cross church	1474–1500	changes in 1624; nowadays Orthodox	
↑	Scinawa (Lubin County)	Church of the Exaltation of the Cross	15th century		
↓	Tymowa (Gmina Scinawa)	Holy Queen Mary church (Matki Bożej Królowej Świata)	14th century	alterations of the roof	
↑	Kruszyna (Gmina Skarbimierz)	St. Mary of the Rosary church	early 16th century		
↓	Małujowice (Gmina Skarbimierz)	St. James church	1250		
↑	Sławków (Będzin County)	Holy Cross & St. Nicholas church	mid 13th century	presbytery in Romanesque-Gothic transitional style	
↓	Śmiałowice (Świdnica County)	St. Lawrence church	present building about 1500	top storey of the steeple probably newer, nave later rebuilt	
↑	Sobotka (Wrocław County)	St. Anne church	14th century, 1500	blind stone building, windows of brick in the gable probably Gothic; hall church	
↓	Środa Śląska	St. Andrew's Church	13th century & 1388	changes in 1670 and 1830	
↑	Środa Śląska	Town Hall	15th century		
↓	Cesarzowice (Gmina Środa Śląska)	St. Martin church	steeple 14th century	nave of boulders 16th & 18th century; steeple rebuilt in 21st century (photo before reconstruction)	
↑	Stary Grodków (Gmina Skoroszyce)	Holy Trinity church	end 13th century	much enlarged in 1910	
↓	Strzegom	Saints Peter and Paul Basilica			
↑	Strzegom	Saint Anthony chapel	15th & 16th centuries	city gate converted to a chapel; some parts and framings of brick	
↓	Strzelniki (Opole Voivodeship)	St. Anthony church	about 1300	alterations of 1688	
↑	Świdnica	Cathedral	1330, 1535–1545	except of the West façade and tower bay brick	
↓	Święta Katarzyna (Gmina Siechnice)	St. Catherine of Alexandria church	13th century		
↑	Wilczków (Gmina Żórawina)	Church of St. Mary Assumption	14th century	alterations in 1891	
↓	Wińsko (Wolów County)	Holy Trinity church	15th century	hall church; tower 1876	
↑	Kryniczno (Gmina Wisznia Mała)	St. Stanislaus church	end 15th century		
↓	Ozorowice (Gmina Wisznia Mała)	St. John the Baptist church	15th century	later alterations	
↑	Strzeszów (Gmina Wisznia Mała)	Exaltation of the Holy Cross church	end 15th century	lower parts of boulders, upper parts of brick	
↓	Wołów	St. Lawrence church	since 1391	later alterations	
↑	Wołów	Defensive walls		later alterations	
↓	Wrocław	St. John the Baptist Archcathedral	1234–1341, later repairs	98-metre (322-foot) high towers	
↑	Wrocław	Collegiate Church of the Holy Cross and St. Bartholomew	1288 – first half of 14th century		
↓	Wrocław	St. Elizabeth's Church	1309–1387		
↑	Wrocław	Cathedral of St. Mary Magdalene	1355–1360		
↓	Wrocław	Old Town Hall	13th & 15th century	19th-century additions	
↑	Wrocław	St. Martin's Church	13th century		
↓	Wrocław	Nativity of Saint Mary Orthodox Church	15th century		
↑	Wrocław	Church of St Mary on the Sand	1334–75		
↓	Wrocław	Church of St. Adalbert	1250–1487		
↑	Wrocław	Church of St. Mathew	1300–1569		
↓	Wrocław	St. Vincent and St. James Cathedral	14th/15th century		
↑	Wrocław	Church of Sts. Dorothea, Wenceslaus, and Stanislaus	1351–1401		
↓	Wrocław	Corpus Christi church	15th century		
↑	Wrocław	Church of John of Capistrano	1462–1505	former Wrocław Bernardine Monastery, nowadays an architecture museum	
↑	Wrocław	Wrocław Arsenal	1459		
↓	Żabin (Gmina Niechlów)	St. Michael church	14th century	brick tower joint to the brick nave and separate wooden belltower	
↑	Ziębice (Ząbkowice County)	St. George Basilica	nave 4th quarter of 13th century	later alterations	
↓	Żmigród (Trzebnica County)	Holy Trinity church	1595–1601		
↑	Żmigród (Trzebnica County)	Donjon of the medieval Żmigród Castle	1560	1655–1660 a Baroque palace was built nearby	
↑	Żory	Sts. Philip & James Church	13th century	after fires rebuilt in 1663; hall church	
↑	Żukowice (Głogów County)	St. Hedwig church	14th century		
↑	Kłoda (Gmina Żukowice)	St. Bartholomew church	14th century		
↑	Nielubia (Gmina Żukowice)	St. Michel church	15th/16th century	parish since 991; only tower and eastern gable of brick	

Silesia ⬆ : Brzeg • Byczyna • Głogów • Góra • Namysłów • Nysa • Gm. Olszanka • Opole • Wrocław

Navigation: W.POM • GDA.POM • CHŁM • WAR+MAS+POW • GR-PL+KUJ+LĘC • MAZ • LUBU • EAST • SIL • LESS.PL

== Lesser Poland ==
– Lesser Poland, Subcarpathian, Świętokrzyskian & Lublin Voivodeships –

Kraków • Oświęcim • Przeworsk • Sandomierz • Tarnów

↕	Place	Building	Main period of construction	Special features	Image
↓	Bejsce (Kazimierza County)	St. Nicholas church	2nd half of 14th century		
↓	Beszowa (Gmina Łubnice)	Pauline church (kościół paulinów)	1407–1423	upper gable of visible brick, some other parts of originally invisible brick	
↓	Biecz	Corpus Christi church	c. 1326–1480		
↓	Biecz	Bell Tower	15th century	upper parts: mannerist sgraffito decorations	
↑	Bochnia	St. Nicolas Church	1440–1445		
↓	Chęciny	Chęciny Castle	13th or 14th century	upper parts of brick, rest limestone; destroyed in the Swedish Deluge, nowadays in ruins	
↑	Chrzanów	St. Nicolas church	about 1429	only presbytery medieval, only window framings of brick, nave & else 1912–1914	
↓	Dębno	Dębno Castle	15th century		
↑	Drzewica	St. Luke's Church	1321–1460		
↓	Drzewica	Drzewica Castle	1527–1535	Gothic-Renaissance, upper parts of brick, lower parts brick & sandstone, nowadays in ruins	
↑	Kargów (Gmina Tuczępy)	Church of Our Lady of Częstochowa	14th & 20th century	rests of medieval brick walls in 20th century stone building	
↑	Koprzywnica (Sandomierz County)	St. Florian abbey church	Gothic 1507	church and monastery 1218–1238 of stone; gables of choir and transept augmented in Gothic style by brick	
↑	Kraków	Kraków Barbican	1498–1499		
↓	Kraków	Collegium Maius	15th century		
↑	Kraków	Corpus Christi Basilica	1385–1405		
↓	Kraków	Basilica of the Holy Trinity	14th and 15th century, rebuilt after 1850 fire	former Dominican church	
↑	Kraków	St. Florian's Gate	early 14th century	upper parts of brick, rest limestone	
↓	Kraków	St. Gregory church	1416–1420	predecendant from 1222; Renaiscanec alterations; hall church	
↓	Kraków	St. Catherine church	1342–1426		
↑	Kraków	Corpus Christi Basilica	1385–1405	alterations around 1500 and in 1566–1582	
↓	Kraków	Church of the Assumption of the Blessed Virgin Mary	1321–1331, 14th–15th century	hall church	
↑	Kraków	Old Synagogue	1407 or 1492		
↓	Kraków	Town Hall Tower	end of 13th century		
↑	Kraków	Wawel Castle	13th–16th century	atop a limestone outcrop, built at the behest of Casimir III the Great, in 14th century rebuilt by Jogaila and Jadwiga of Poland	
↓	Kraków	Wawel Cathedral	1320–1364	upper parts of brick, rest limestone	
↓	Kraków	Cistercian Mogiła Abbey		Baroque alterations, Gothic elements partly restored	
↑	Kraśnik	Church of the Assumption of the Blessed Virgin Mary	1469	alterations in 1527–1541 and late 17th century; choir still of brick	
↓	Krosno	Basilica of the Holy Trinity	1342		
↑	Krosno	Franciscan Church and Monastery	1402		
↓	Krzcięcice (Gmina Sędziszów)	St. Procopius church (św. Prokopa)	1531–1542		
↑	Lublin	Kraków Gate	14th century	partly renewed in 18th century	
↓	Lublin	Lublin Castle	13th–14th century	destroyed in the Swedish Deluge, reconstructions in 19th century	
↑	Luborzyca (Gm. Kocmyrzów-Luborzyca)	Exaltation of the Holy Cross church	since 1433		
↓	Nowy Korczyn (Busko County)	St. Stanislaus church	13th/14th century	Baroque alterations	
↑	Stary Korczyn (Gmina Nowy Korczyn)	St. Nicholas church (św. Mikołaja)	mid 14th century	19th century alterations	
↓	Nowy Sącz	Church of St. Margaret	13th and 14th century	upper parts of brick, lower of sandstone; southernmost building of northern/Baltic Brick Gothic region	
↑	Olkusz	St. Andrew's church	13th/14th centuries	hall church, upper gables of visible brick	
↓	Oświęcim	St. Mary's Church	14th century		
↑	Oświęcim	St. Hyacinth chapel	early 14th & late 16th century	Salesian	
↓	Oświęcim	Oświęcim Castle	13th century	palace since 16th century, reconstructions 1929–1931	
↓	Paczków	St. John the Evangelist's Church	14th century		
↓	Pilzno	Church of John the Baptist	14th century		
↑	Piotrawin (Gmina Łaziska)	St. Thomas church	1440/1441		
↓	Piotrawin (Gmina Łaziska)	a Crusader's grave chapel	1440/1441	Baroque alterations	
↑	Prandocin (Gmina Słomniki)	complex of St. John the Baptist church	brick 1480–1490	Gothic presbytery of brick on a Romanesque building of ashlar	
↓	Przemyków (Gmina Koszyce)	St. Catherine church	15th century	16th & 17th century additions	
↑	Przeworsk	Collegiate of the Holy Ghost	1430–1473	Baroque alterations	
↓	Przeworsk	St. Barbara Church	1461–1465		
↑	Przeworsk	City walls	15th & 16th centuries		
↓	Raciborowice (Gmina Michałowice)	St. Margaret church	1460–1476		
↑	Sandomierz	Cathedral	1360	partially rebuilt in 1670 (façade)	
↓	Sandomierz	Długosz House	1476		
↑	Sandomierz	Opatów Gate	14th century		
↓	Sandomierz	Sandomierz Castle	14th century	partially rebuilt in 1520 in renaissance style by Benedykt from Sandomierz	
↑	Secemin (Włoszczowa County)	Church of St. Catherine and St. John the Apostle	1402	1558–1617 Protestant; alterations to Baroque in 18th century	
↓	Skalbmierz (Kazimierza County)	St. John the Baptist church	Gothic 15th century	northern aisle added to the choir of the Romanesque stone church	
↑	Stężyca (Ryki County)	St. Martin church	1522–1532		
↓	Szydłów	St. Ladislaus' Church	around 1355		
↑	Tarnobrzeg	Church of St. Mary Magdalene	1132-1166 & 1340s,	Gothic revision (arcs and vaults) in the 1340s	
↓	Tarnów	Cathedral	14th century	rebuilt 1889–1897 in neo-Gothic style	
↑	Tarnów	Mikołajowski House	15th century, 1524		
↓	Tarnów	Town Hall	14th century	rebuilt in the renaissance style in 16th century	
↑	Wawrzeńczyce (Gmina Igołomia-Wawrzeńczyce)	Sts. Sigismund & Mary Magdalene church	1223 & 15th century	only eastern gable still of visible brick	
↓	Wiślica	Długosz House	1460		
↑	Wiślica	Minor Basilica	1350	two nave church, upper parts of brick, lower of limestone	
↓	Bolechowice (Gmina Zabierzów)	Sts. Peter & Paul church	14th/15th century	middle section replaced about 1625	
↑	Rudawa (Gmina Zabierzów)	All Saints church	presbytery 1470	plastered nave of 1326; later alterations	
↓	Zator (Oświęcim County)	Sts. Adalbert & George church	1391	Baroque in 1766, regothicized in 1959–1973	
↑	Zator (Oświęcim County)	Zator Castle	Gothic 15th century	alterations in late 16th & 18th centuries	
↑	Zawichost	St. John the Baptist Church	1244–1257		
↑	Żębocin (Gmina Proszowice)	St. Stanislaus church	century	massive alterations in 18th century	
↑	Zielonk (Kraków County)	Church of the Nativity of the Blessed Virgin Mary	1533	modern church added in 20th century; more informations missing	

Lesser Poland: Kraków • Oświęcim • Przeworsk • Sandomierz • Tarnów

Lesser Poland ⬆ : Kraków • Oświęcim • Przeworsk • Sandomierz • Tarnów

Poland: W.POM • GDA.POM • CHŁM • WAR+MAS+POW • GR-PL+KUJ+LĘC • MAZ • LUBU • EAST • SIL • LESS.PL

International navigation: BELA • BEL • CZ • DK • ENG • EST • FIN • FRA • GER • HUNG • ITA • LAT • LIT • NL • POL • RUS • SK • SWE • SWI • UKR

== Bibliography ==
- Sławomir Brzezicki & al. – Zabytki sztuki w Polsce – Śląsk (Krajowy Ośrodek Badań i Dokumentacij Zabytków, Warszawa)
- Sławomir Brzezicki & al. – Dehio-Handbuch der Kunstdenkmäler in Polen – Schlesien (Deutscher Kunstverlag, Berlin)
- Marianne Mehling (ed.): Knaurs Kulturführer in Farbe Polen. Munich 1995. ISBN 3-426-26492-7
- Michael Antoni (ed.): Georg Dehio Handbuch der deutschen Kunstdenkmäler. West- und Ostpreußen. Munich 1993. ISBN 3-422-03025-5
- Georg Dehio: Handbuch der deutschen Kunstdenkmäler. Vol. 2: Nordostdeutschland. Berlin, 1906 (digitized see digi.ub.uni-heidelberg.de), comprising about half of present-day Poland.

International navigation: BELA • BEL • CZ • DK • ENG • EST • FIN • FRA • GER • HUNG • ITA • LAT • LIT • NL • POL • RUS • SK • SWE • SWI • UKR
