= Łukta (river) =

River in Poland

Location
- Country: Poland

Physical characteristics
- Mouth
  - location: Marąg
  - coordinates: 53°49′34″N 20°05′57″E

Basin features
- Progression: Marąg→ Pasłęka→ Baltic Sea

The Łukta is a river flowing through the village of Łukta, a tributary of the Marąg river.
