= Purda, Poland =

Purda
- Village
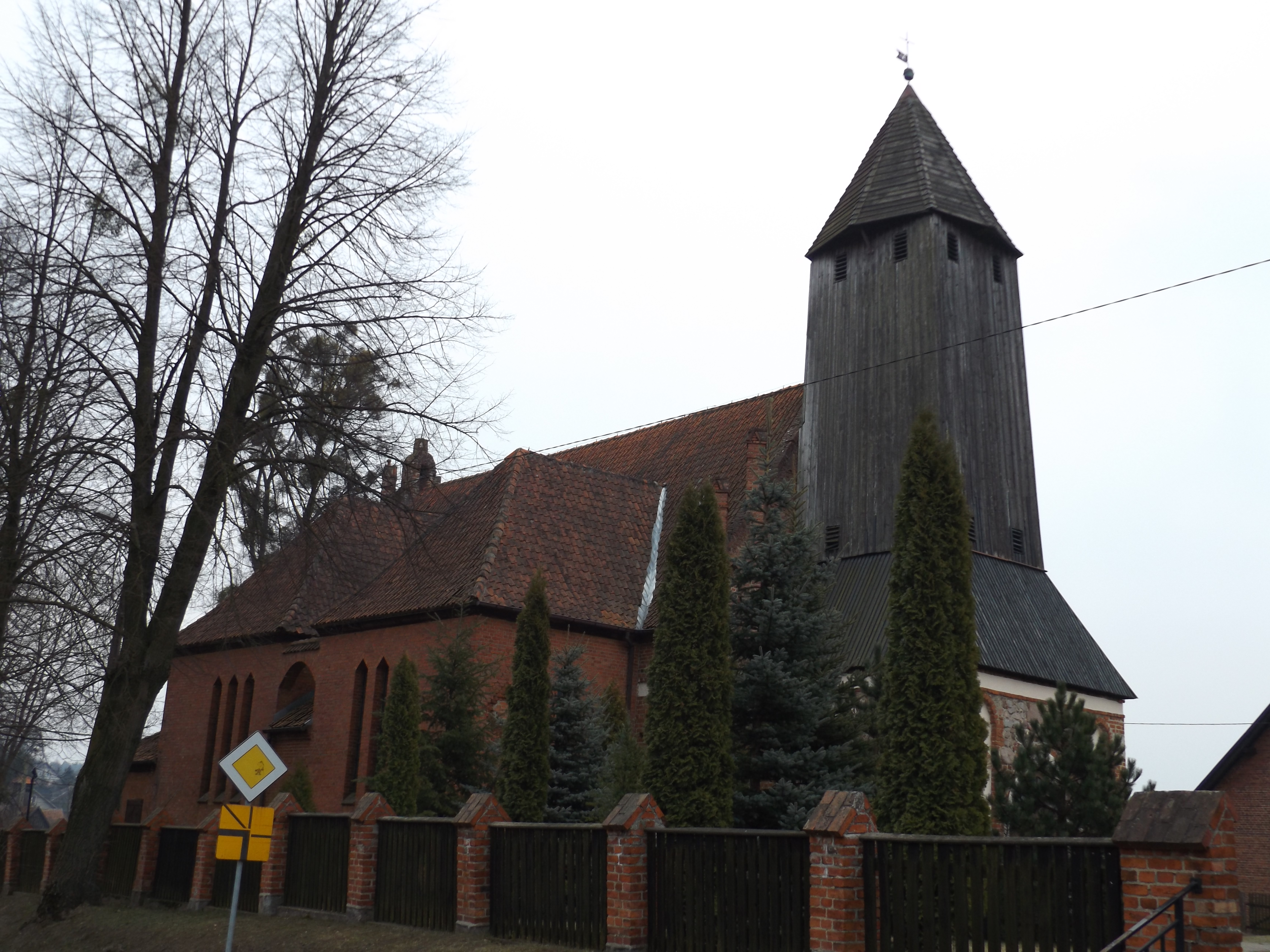
- Saint Michael Archangel church in Purda

- Location within Poland
- Coordinates: 53°43′N 20°42′E
- Country: Poland
- Voivodeship: Warmian-Masurian
- County: Olsztyn
- Gmina: Purda
- Population: 1,140
- Postal code: 11-030
- Area code: +48 89
- Vehicle registration: NOL

Purda [ˈpurda] is a village in Olsztyn County, Warmian-Masurian Voivodeship, in northern Poland. It is the seat of the gmina (administrative district) called Gmina Purda. It is located within the historic region of Warmia.

The historic sights of Purda include the Gothic Saint Michael Archangel church, a typical Warmian old wayside shrine and a Catholic cemetery.

The village was founded in 1384. Polish poet and bishop Ignacy Krasicki visited Purda in 1779.

== Gallery ==
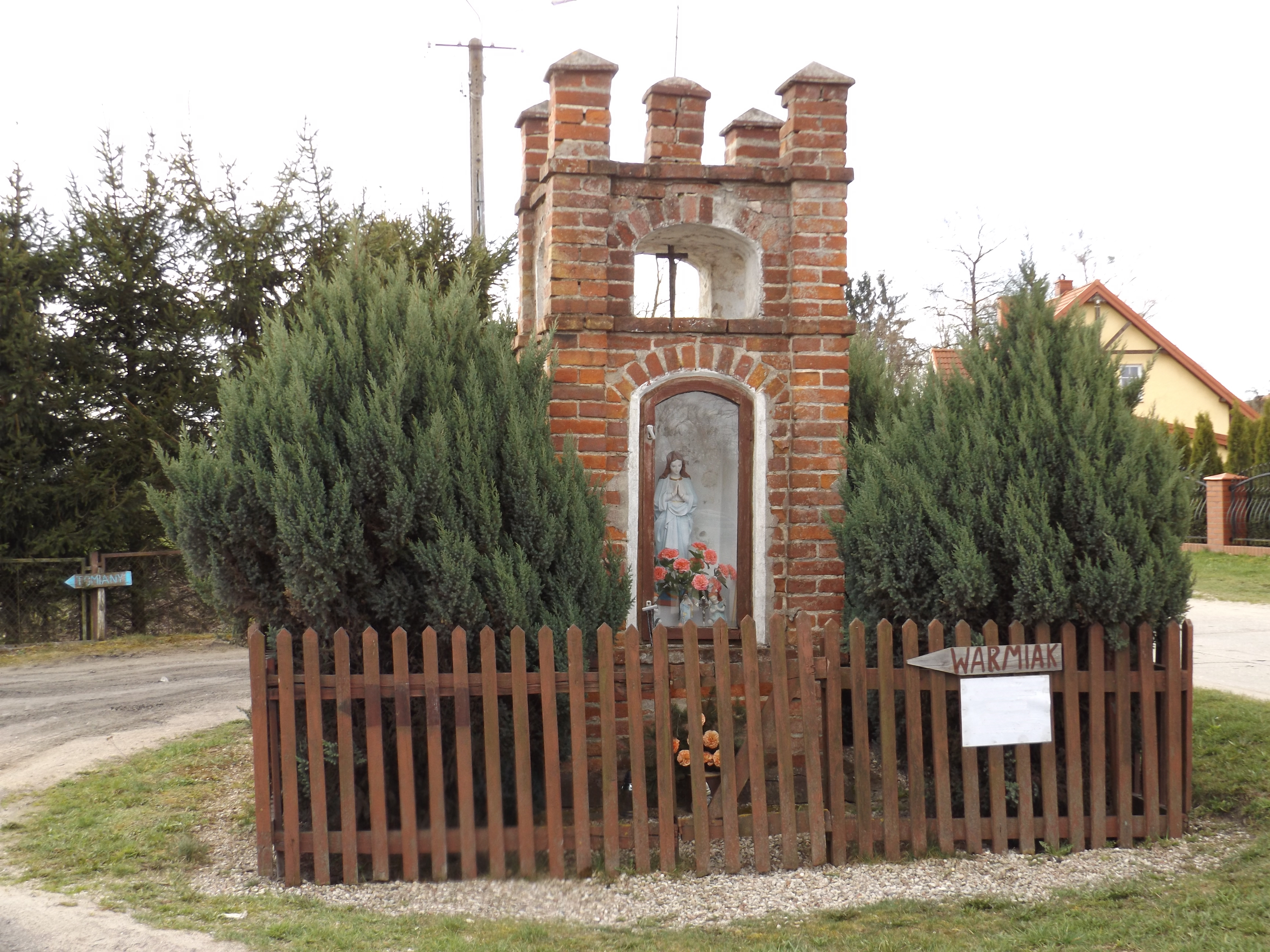
Warmian old wayside shrine

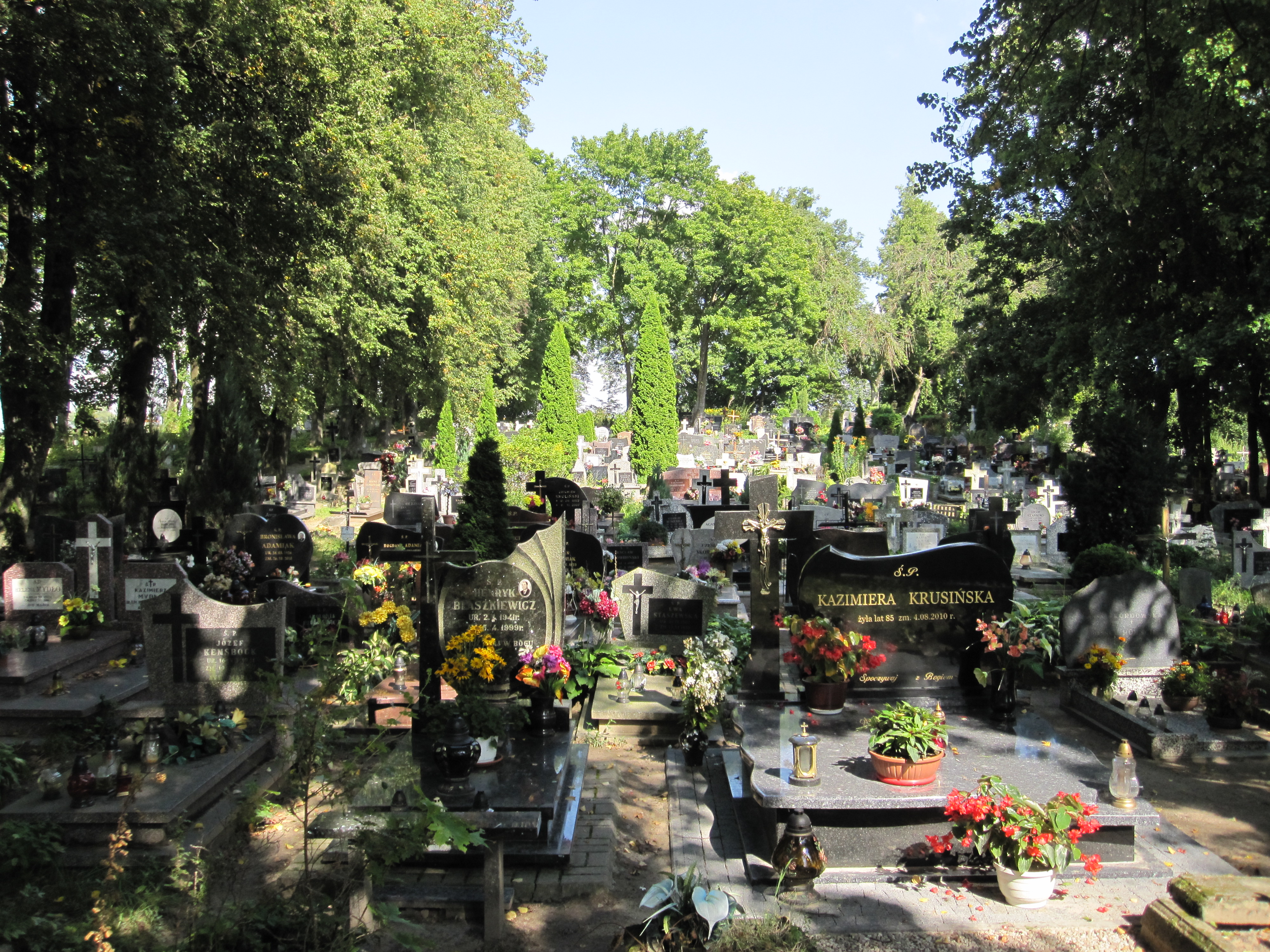
Catholic cemetery

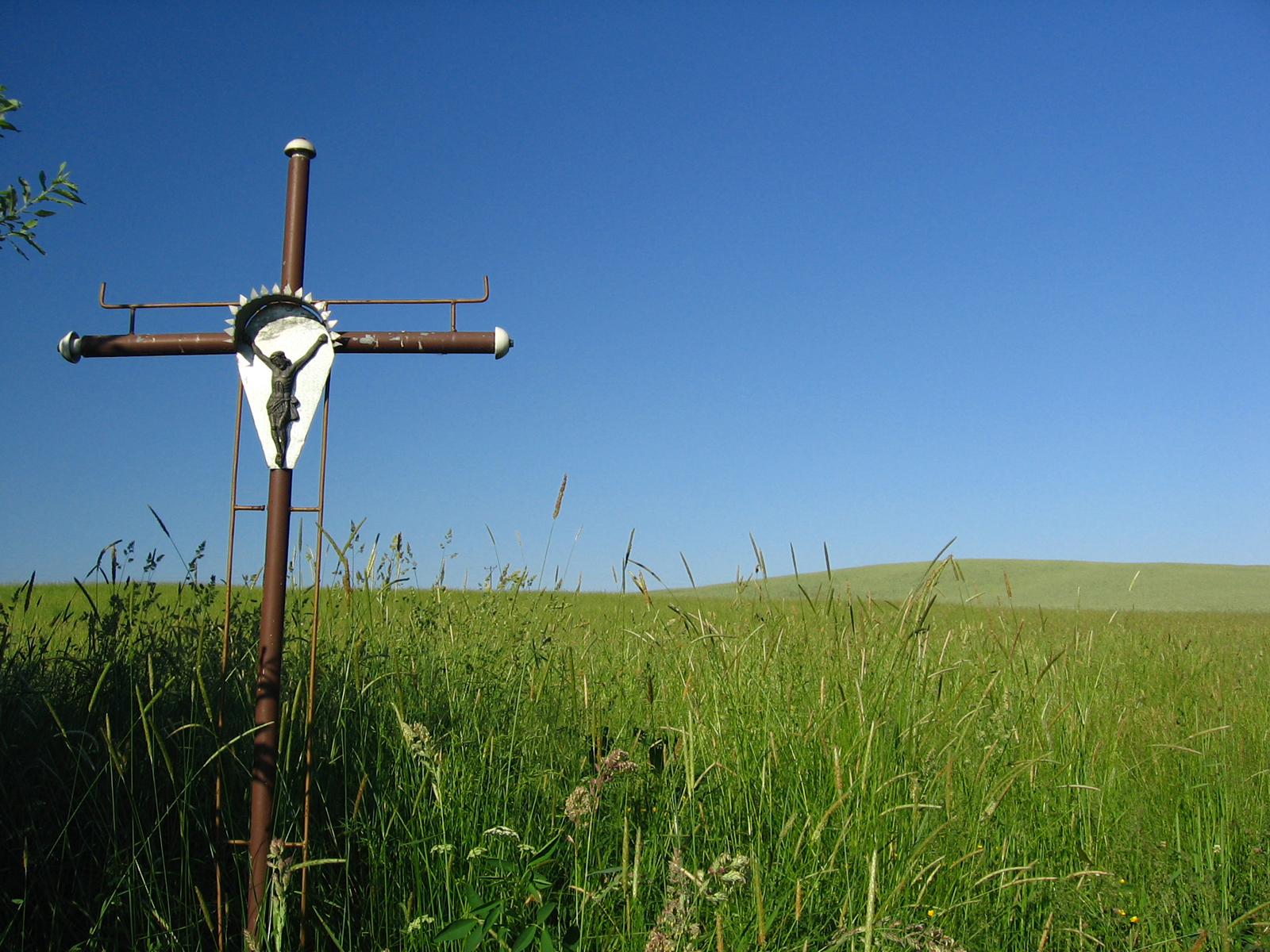
Road cross in Purda

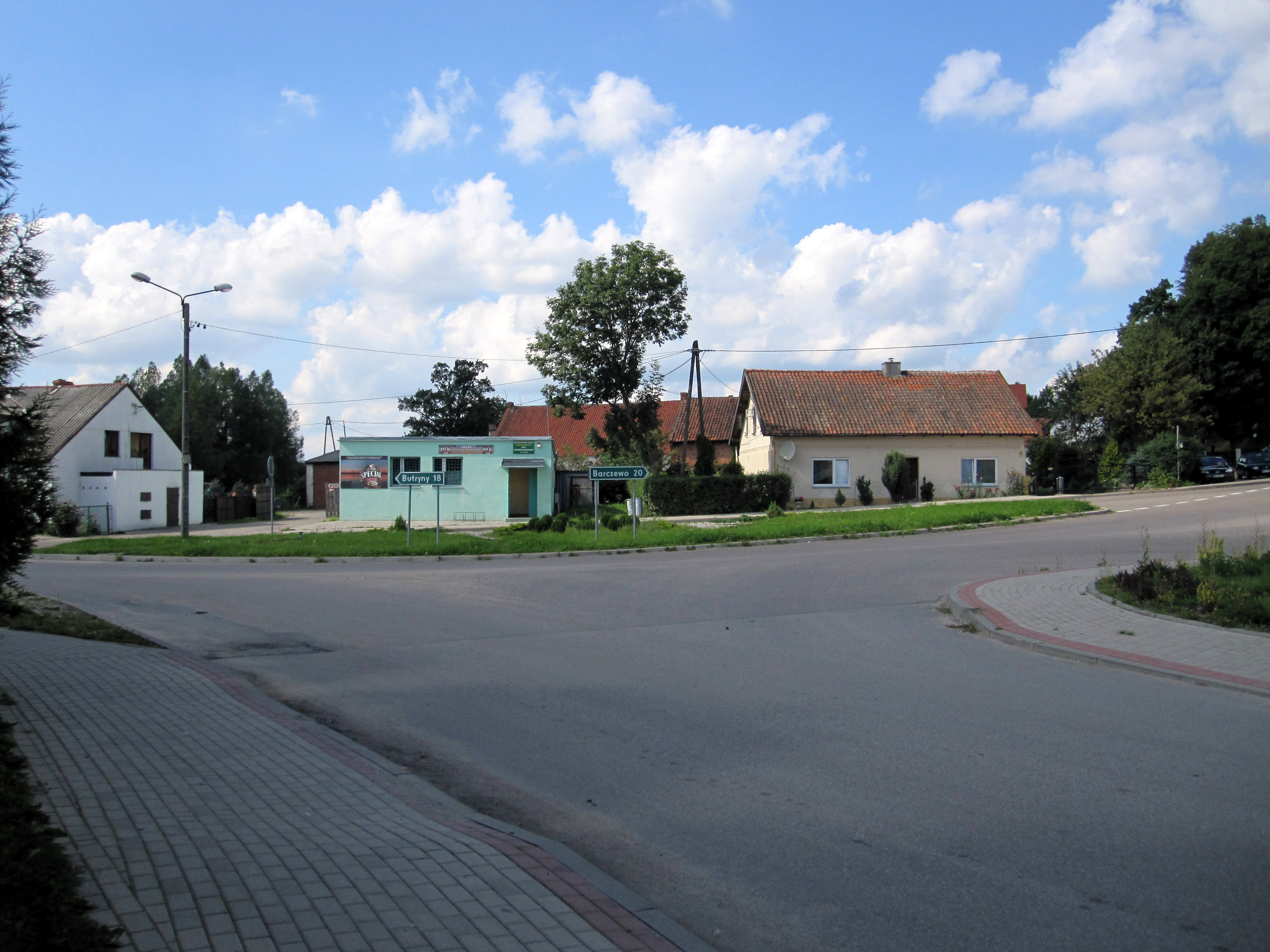
Crossroads in Purda
