= Łukta =

- Village
- Coat of arms

- Location within Poland
- Coordinates: 53°48′19″N 20°5′7″E
- Country: Poland
- Voivodeship: Warmian-Masurian
- County: Ostróda
- Gmina: Łukta
- Population: 1,210
- Time zone: UTC+1 (CET)
  - Summer (DST): UTC+2 (CEST)
- Area code: (+48) 89
- ISO 3166 code: POL
- Website: http://www.lukta.pl

Łukta [ˈwukta] is a village in Ostróda County, Warmian-Masurian Voivodeship, in northern Poland. It is the seat of the gmina (administrative district) called Gmina Łukta. The village lies on the river Łukta.

The village is the location of a local road junction, where three voivodeship roads meet: the 527, 530 and 531.

From 1975 to 1998 Łukta was in Olsztyn Voivodeship.

The village has a football club Warmiak Łukta, a regional development foundation Fundacja Rozwoju Regionu Łukta, a church with churchyard and tower, restaurants, groceries and a dairy.

== History ==
The village was first mentioned in 1340, and given a charter (possibly not for the first time) in 1352. In 1414, at a time of wars, the village was destroyed by the Polish army. At that time four taverns, one mill and twelve households were burned down.

== Historical buildings ==
A Gothic church (since World War II dedicated to the Black Madonna of Częstochowa) was built in 1407; the tower was added in 1700. In the main altar there is a triptych from about 1580, with a sculpture of the Madonna made of wood. The pulpit dates from the 16th century. The church contains two 17th-century gravestones: that of Achatius von Borcke and his wife.
