= Co-Cathedral Basilica of St. James in Olsztyn =

- Bazylika konkatedralna św. Jakuba Apostoła w Olsztynie
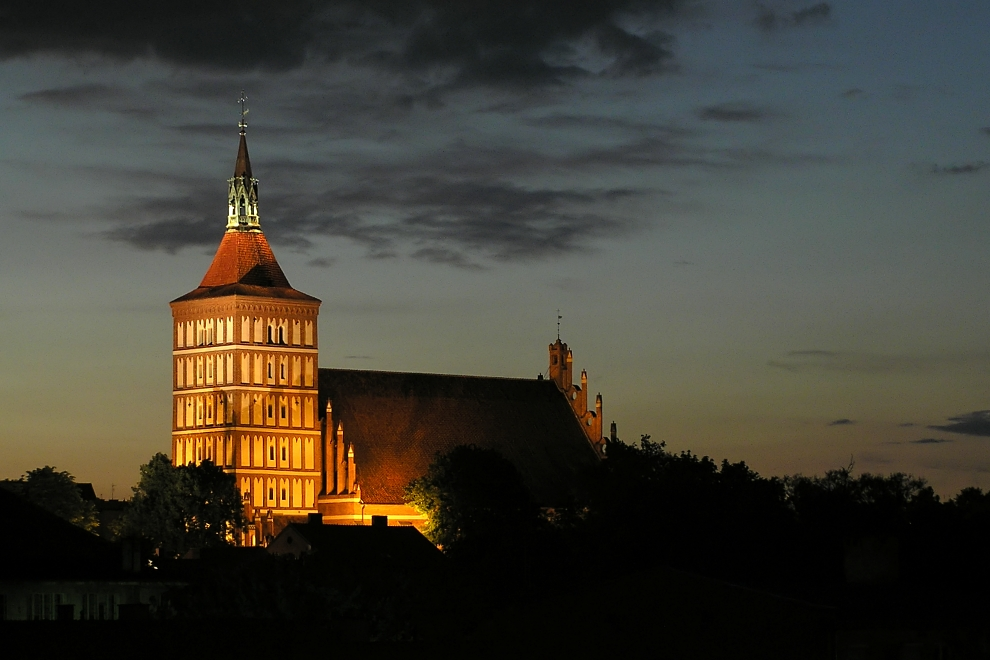
- Co-Cathedral Basilica of St. James in Olsztyn
- 53°46′33.2″N 20°28′40″E
- Location: Olsztyn
- Country: Poland
- Denomination: Catholic

Architecture
- Heritage designation: Register of monuments
- Architectural type: Gothic
- Years built: 14th to 16th c.

The Co-Cathedral Basilica of St. James in Olsztyn (Polish: Bazylika konkatedralna św. Jakuba Apostoła w Olsztynie) is a Catholic basilica and co-cathedral in Olsztyn, Poland. It is a notable example of 14th century gothic architecture, and it is on the register of monuments in Poland. The church is located in the Old Town area of Olsztyn.

The church is named for James the Great.

== History ==
The church was built in the 14th and 15th centuries, with vaulting and the tower added in the 16th century.

During the Napoleonic Wars, the French used the church to imprison hundreds of Russian soldiers. The soldiers burned much of the original woodwork to stay warm during the winter. The Old Town area was again damaged in 1945, but was largely spared during World War I.

During the Polish People's Republic, the parish sued the government over rent collection. The case eventually traveled to the supreme court, but the parish lost the case. In 1966, a version of the Black Madonna was meant to visit the Olsztyn parish to celebrate the 1000th anniversary of Christianity in Poland, but communist authorities rerouted it and then confiscated the icon.

== Conservation ==
In 2017, renovation work took place on the tower. Corrosion and damaged plaster were repaired. In 2018, a hidden crypt underneath the church was uncovered and renovated. The renovations were critical to the structural support of the church's tower. In 2023, the church was one of the only historic structures in Olsztyn to receive funding under the Monument Protection Program. It received 3.5 million zlotys for renovation purposes.

== Architecture ==
The church is built in the brick gothic style. The church features a crystalline vault. The right altar forms a triptych of the Annunciation.

== See also ==
- Frombork Cathedral
