= St. Vitalis Church =

Church building in Włocławek, Poland

Coordinates: 52°39′35″N 19°04′05″E

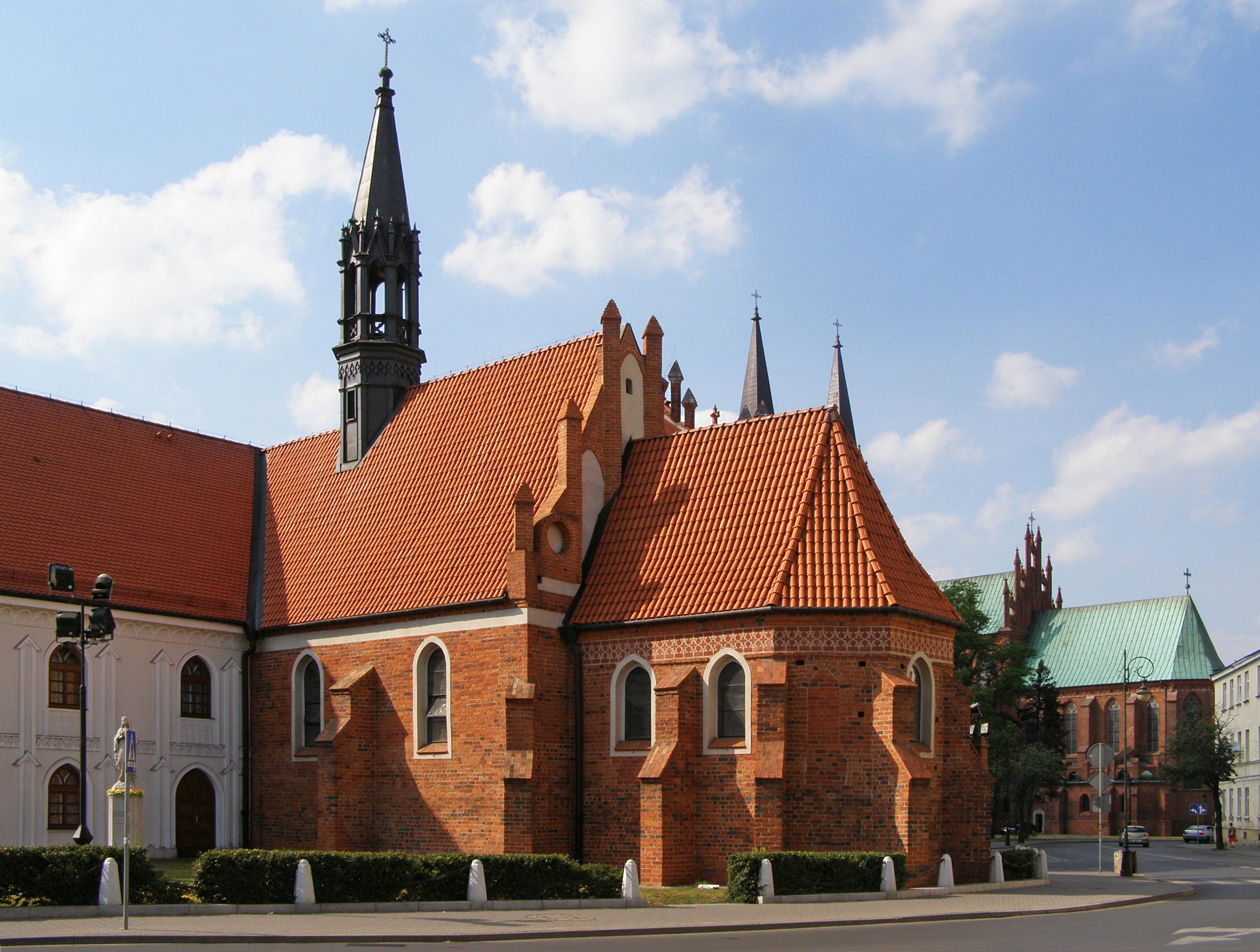
St. Vitalis Church

The St. Vitalis Church in Wloclawek, in the years 1330-1411 serving as a substitute cathedral, currently the Seminary Church of the Higher Theological Seminary, is the oldest preserved historic monument in Włocławek.

== Architecture ==
The church was built in the Gothic style using burnt brick. It is a single-aisle building, with a separate rectangular presbytery closed polygonally, leaning to the left from the axis of the body, to resemble the position of Jesus dying on the cross. The interior is cross-ribbed vaulted. The church is surrounded by one-scarred slopes on the outside.

== History ==
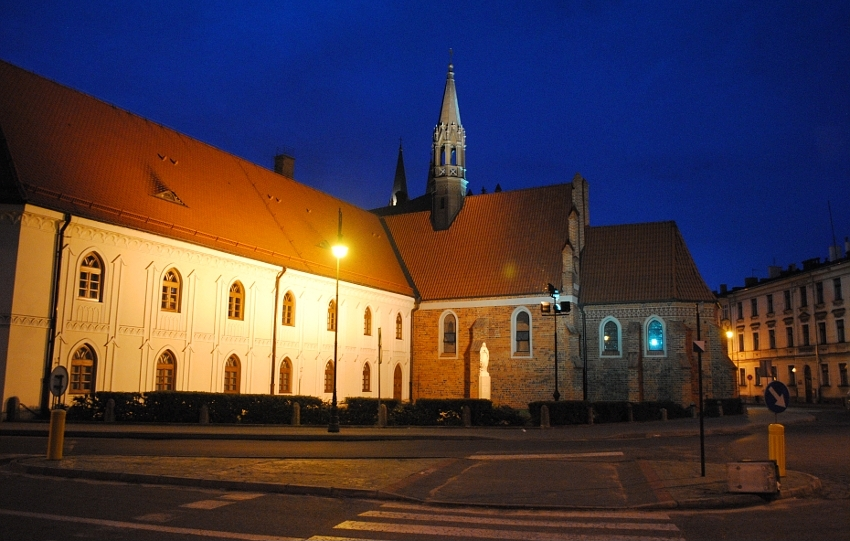
Illumination

The temple was founded by bishop Maciej of Gołańcza in 1330, just after Włocławek was demolished and the former cathedral on the Vistula River burned down by the Teutonic Knights in 1329. In the years 1330-1411, i.e. until the final completion of the new cathedral basilica, St. Vitalis's Church served as a temporary cathedral. Afterwards, it was given to the St. Vitalis Hospital (a shelter) located nearby. Together with the hospital, the church was maintained by the cathedral capitulary, which was reluctant to take on this burden, believing that since the bishop built the church, his successors should seek to maintain it. But the bishops didn't favor this alternative either. As a result, an unrenovated church quickly deteriorated. As early as the 15th century it was completely ruined, stripped of everything and required a thorough restoration.

Bishop Władysław Oporowski organized a fundraiser to rescue St. Vitalis's Church, at the same time appointing a special indulgence for donors. However, it is not known whether the intended renovation was actually carried out. Sources say that about 100 years later, in the years 1534-1544, canon Tobiasz Janikowski renovated the whole church at his own expense and replaced the existing wooden Gothic ceiling with a brick one, which has been preserved until today. It is a kind of ribbed vault, where the sheaves of ribs fall on large supports.

The seminary, which was founded in 1569, took over some of the hospital buildings and the church of St. Vitalis. The church, however, stood separately, at a distance from the seminary buildings and was surrounded by a fenced cemetery. After 1717, a small sacristy was added to the northern side of the presbytery and the tower was converted into a ridge turret.

In 1843, a new seminary pavilion was built and the church of St. Vitalis was incorporated into it. The church was now accessed directly from a seminar corridor. It was still open to the faithful as well. It was not until 1866 that the church went into the exclusive use of the seminary (the faithful gathered there only for the indulgenced feast of St. Vitalis, which falls on the second Sunday of May and sporadically on other separate occasions).

In the nineteenth and twentieth century the church of St. Vitalis was repeatedly renovated, painted and had its interior decoration changed.

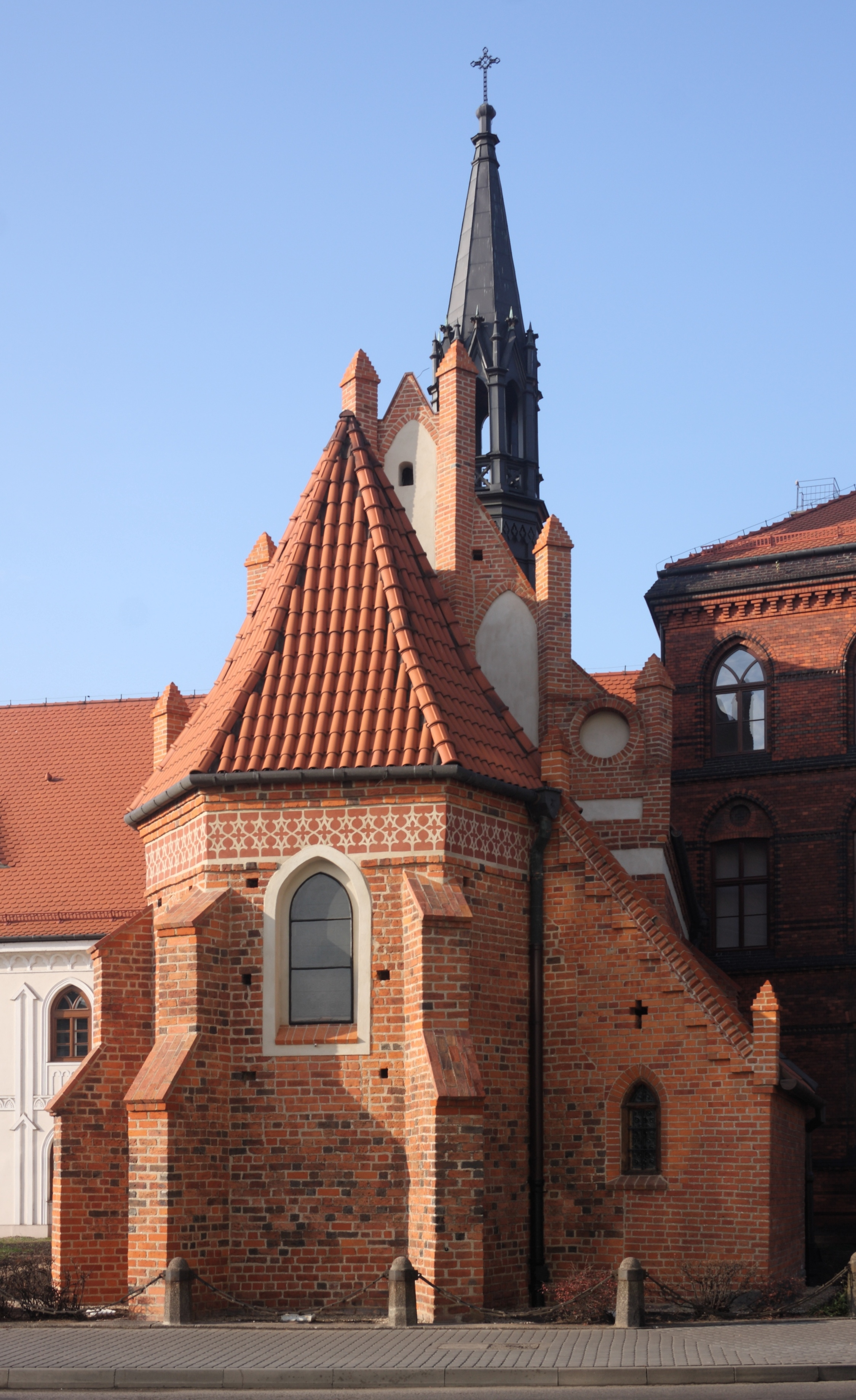

In the years 1851-1853 it was restored under the direction of the prefect of the seminary, Father Franciszek Płoszczyński. The old quadrilateral tower was covered with iron sheet metal, leaving a dome covered with copper sheet, the walls were repaired from inside and plastered. In 1888 the ruined tower was pulled down and a new one, in the Gothic style, according to the design by Konstanty Wojciechowski, was put up and covered with copper sheet. The church was painted (polychrome) in years: 1854, 1873, 1895. Usually there was a main altar and two side altars. In 1880 colourful stained-glass windows were placed in four windows, but these were replaced by white glass in 1903, probably in order to gain more natural light.

Between 1930 and 1934 the church of St. Vitalis was restored again. The interior plasters were ripped off and new ones were added; the ribs, which were partially cut in the Baroque period, were now completed and left in "live" brick; the former music choir was removed and a new one was created from the part of the adjacent seminary corridor; plastered parts from outside the walls were uncovered; a valuable Gothic triptych from around 1460 was placed in the main altar. In 1936 a new organ was installed, which is still used today, made by S. Truszczyński's company from Włocławek.

During the occupation, the church was considered to be German and was used for Sunday services for German soldiers who stayed in a war hospital arranged in the seminar building.

In 1971-1972 the last thorough restoration of the church was done. A new clay roof was laid, rotten bricks in the walls were replaced and external decorative elements were reconstructed. Thanks to these measures, two Gothic brick portals have regained their former splendour: one framing the main entrance to the church (from the seminary corridor) and the other decorating the side entrance in the northern wall. The window openings have been glazed with crown glass. All the old decor of the church was removed and a new, modern style was given: a post-conciliar granite altar, a wooden altar for the tabernacle, a pulpit, benches, doors, lights (new chandeliers) and a sound system. Only the ridge turret remains from the previous neo-Gothic decor of the church, located on the wall opposite the main entrance to the church.

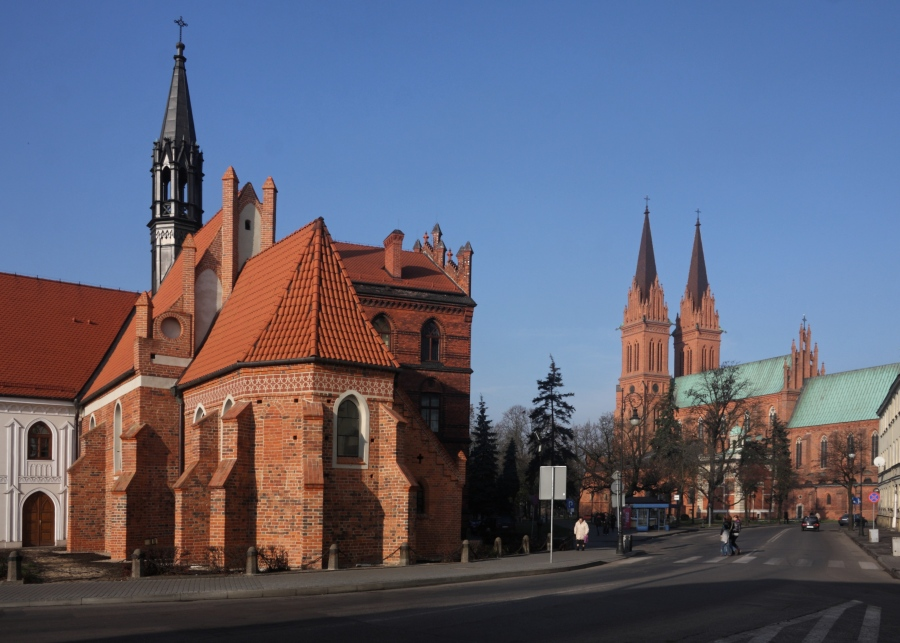

In the year 2000 the roof and the tower were replaced, a new bell was installed, in 2002 the interior of the church was renovated and a new sound system was installed. The Church of St. Vitalis is a seminary church of the Higher Seminary in Włocławek.

== Sources ==
- O kościele św. Witalisa na stronie WSD we Włocławku (pol.)
