= Ciechanów Castle =

Castle in Poland

Castle of the Masovian Dukes in Ciechanów
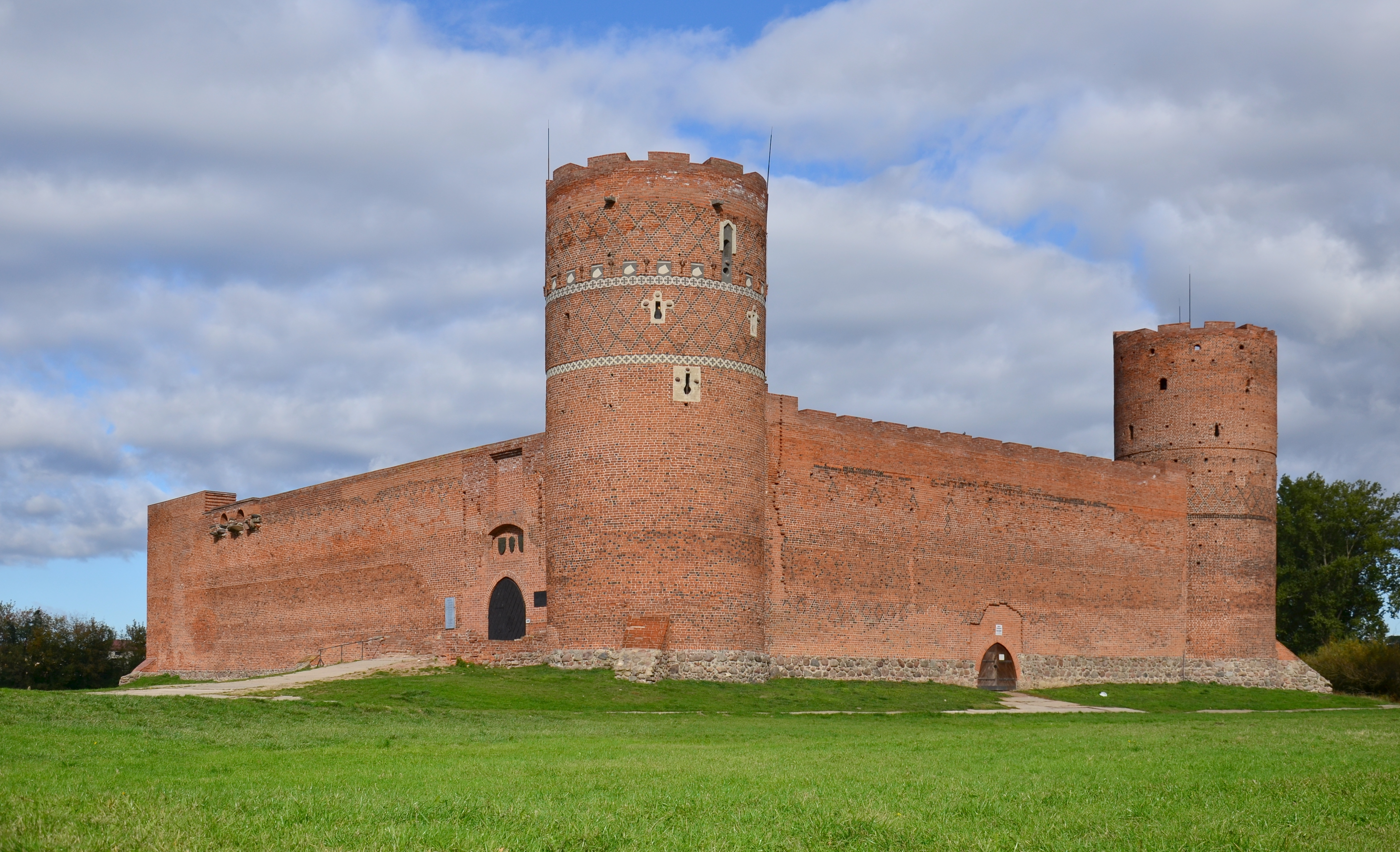
- Castle of the Masovian Dukes in Ciechanów

- Location of the Ciechanów Castle in Poland
- 52°53′05″N 20°37′10″E
- Location: Ciechanów, Masovian Voivodeship; in Poland

History
- Built: c. 1399–1429

Site notes
- Architectural style: Gothic

Castle of the Masovian Dukes is a Brick Gothic castle built at the turn of the 14th and 15th centuries. It is situated in the town of Ciechanów, Masovian Voivodeship, in Poland.

== History ==
Initially, it was believed that the castle was founded by Siemowit III in the middle of the 14th century. However, according to dendrochronological tests, the foundations made of wooden stakes date to around 1399. The castle was erected thereafter with the assistance of Janusz I of Warsaw, Siemowit's son and successor who was Duke of Masovia. Records indicate that a structure was completed in 1429.

The circular towers located in the four corners of the castle's square formation and an additional 10 metre high walls suggested that its initial purpose was a defensive stronghold. As a result of many reconstructions and expansions, the militaristic stronghold was gradually transformed into a royal residence by 1547. In the 1400s, the castle was raised by an additional level and a raised courtyard. After the Third Partition of Poland in 1795, the complex was acquired by the Prussian authorities, and its walls were partially deconstructed for cheap building material. By 1818, the castle belonged to the Krasiński noble family, and in the 20th century it was partially rebuilt.

== See also ==
- Castles in Poland
