= Town Hall (Orneta) =

Town Hall in Poland

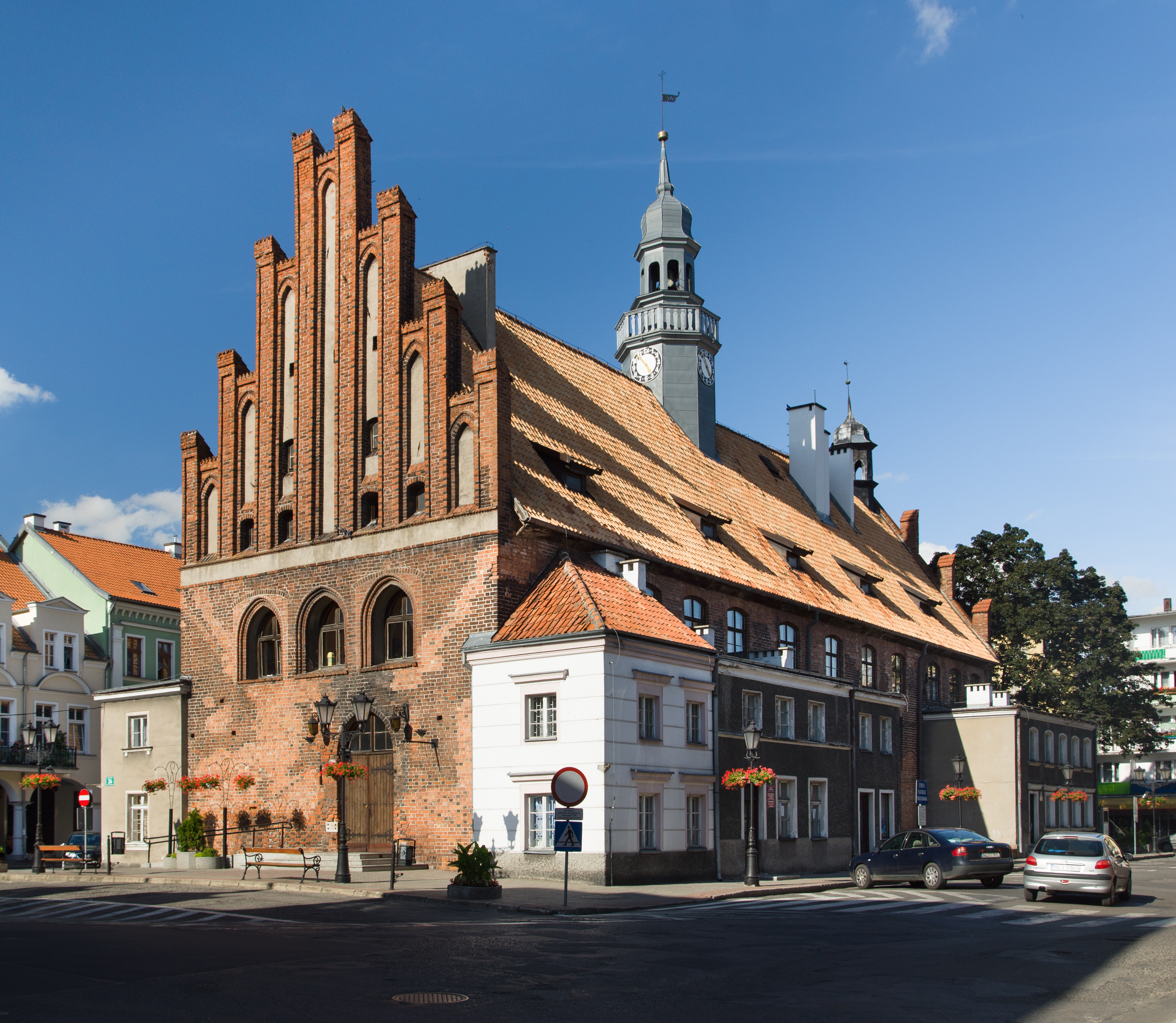
View of the Town Hall

The Town Hall (Ratusz) is a Gothic building in Orneta in Warmia. The building is renowned as a prime example of secular North German brick Gothic architecture.

== History ==
The Town Hall was built in 1384 at the time of the German settlement of the area under the Teutonic Order on the site of a previous building. As in other places, the Dortmund Old Town Hall was the model. From the 15th century, brick merchants' stalls were added to the town hall. After the collapse of the eastern facade in the 17th century, the arcade was omitted during reconstruction, and the building was provided with a riding tower. In 1777, a guardroom for the city police was added to the northern side.

At times, the entrance to the town hall was privately owned, so the city government could legally enter the town hall only with private permission.

In 1907 and 1908, the gables, roof and windows of the building were renovated, in 1920 the interior was rebuilt and a new entrance with stairs to the east side was created. During the Second World War, the building was severely damaged. After Polish annexation of the area, demolition of some of the surrounding buildings began in 1955.

== Architecture ==
The brick building on a rectangular ground plan has a length of 40 meters and two floors. The cellars were covered with vaults and divided into a series of chambers with their own loading openings. In the basement there was a large one-room market hall with meat stalls and bread benches. The building is covered with a gable roof, supported on its shorter sides by Gothic stepped gables, which dominates the image of the building.
