= Rawa Mazowiecka Castle =

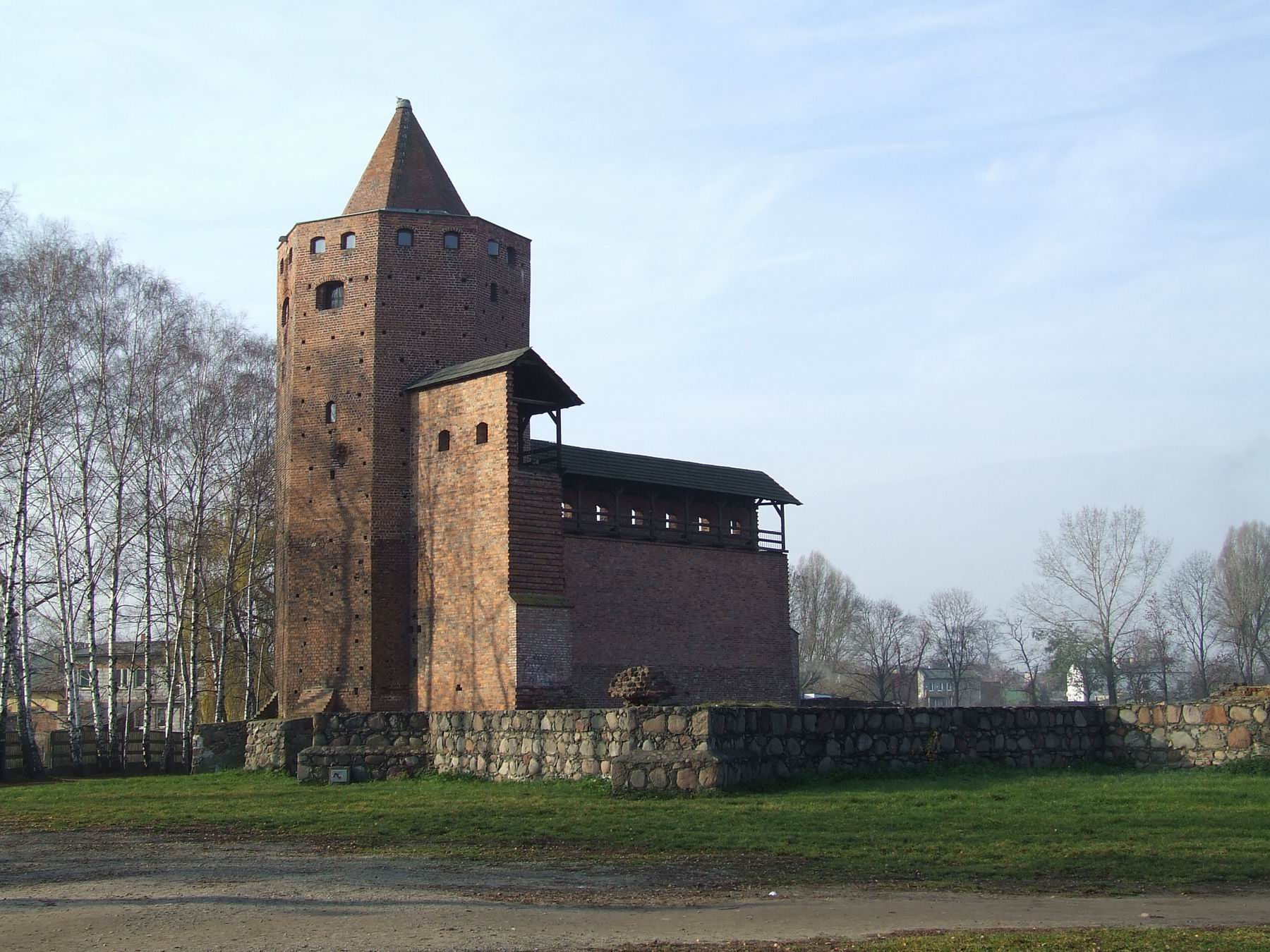
- Rawa Mazowiecka Castle

- Location of the Rawa Mazowiecka Castle in Poland
- 51°46′05″N 20°15′12″E
- Location: Rawa Mazowiecka, Łódź Voivodeship, in Poland

History
- Built: 14th century

Site notes
- Architectural style: Gothic

Rawa Mazowiecka Castle (Polish: Zamek w Rawie Mazowieckiej) is a Gothic architectural style square formation castle located in Rawa Mazowiecka, in the lowlands of the river Rawka and the river Rylka. Currently it is a renovated ruin. It was renovated after the 1958 hurricane, which partially destroyed the whole castle, before the renovation there was only the tower, after the renovation, the structure was rebuilt.

According to the scriptures of Jan Długosz, the castle was built by Casimir III the Great, and the stronghold's function was to protect the southern borders of Masovia.

In 1562, the parliament in Piotrków designated Rawa as the seat of the Tax Commission for the army, and therefore the so-called the Rawa treasury for the needs of the army established by Sigismund II Augustus. During this period, the castle was also the seat of the starosta of Rawa, municipal courts were held there and archives were located there.

In 1601, the Swedish general Carl Carlsson Gyllenhielm, the illegitimate son of Prince Charles of Suderman (who later became King of Sweden as Charles IX Vasa), was imprisoned in the Rawa Castle. Gyllenhielm commanded the Swedish army, which capitulated in 1601 at the Battle of Kokenhausen, fought against Polish troops. Until he was exchanged for Prince Karol Korecki in 1613, he was in Polish captivity, where for six and a half years he walked in chains, which today hang in his tomb in the cathedral in Strängnäs. During the Swedish invasion of Poland, the castle was captured by the enemy in 1655, plundered and partially blown up. In 1665 king John Casimir stayed in the castle, and troops loyal to him were stationed near the city during the Lubomirski Rebellion. In 1766, after the city fire, starosta Franciszek Lanckoroński began to rebuild the castle, rebuilding the bridge over the Rawka River and renovating the rooms in the eastern part of the Big House. Although reconstruction efforts have been raised by Franciszek Lanckoroński, the reconstruction was stopped, most likely due to the Partitions of Poland, after which the Prussian authorities ordered to deconstruct the ruins, only keeping the tower. The rest of the brick material was used for nearby housing. Currently the renovated tower is open to tourists, and the outline of the castle's former square formation has been reconstructed around the tower.

The castle was built on a quadrilateral plan with dimensions of 66 × 64 meters, on a stone foundation. The area it occupied inside the walls was 4,200 m². In the northern part there was a two-story princely palace. The second smaller building stood between the gate and the south-east corner. Inside, in the courtyard, there were wooden farm buildings for the castle staff. The main tower, circular at the base and octagonal above, was located in the southwest corner and, in addition to its defensive functions flanking the gate, was used as a prison. The high, thick wall was built with brick and equipped with a roofed porch with evenly spaced loopholes on the upper floor. The main tower and the wall were connected by an internal passage. The entrance to the castle was in the three-story gate tower on the south side, opposite the palace. You could only get to it through a drawbridge, because the whole thing was surrounded by a defensive moat.

Currently, all that remains of the castle is the restored main tower with reconstructed short fragments of the walls. There are also small remains of the wall along the entire length of the former complex.
