= Pomysk =

Pomysk may refer to the following places in Poland:

- Pomysk Mały
- Pomysk Wielki
