= Rekowo =

Rekowo may refer to the following places in Poland:

In Masovian Voivodeship (east-central Poland):

- Rekowo, Masovian Voivodeship

In Pomeranian Voivodeship (north Poland):

- Rekowo, Bytów County
- Rekowo, Kartuzy County
- Rękowo

In West Pomeranian Voivodeship (north-west Poland):

- Rekowo, Gmina Kamień Pomorski
- Rekowo, Gmina Wolin
- Rekowo, Koszalin County
- Rekowo, Łobez County
- Rekowo, Stargard County
