= Hirsch von Pomischel =

Family Arms

The Hirsch von Pomischel family (Pomyschl, Pomichal, Pomykal, Pomeiske) is the name of a noble family historically active in the Kingdom of Bohemia. Originally from the Duchy of Pomerania, branches of this family also lived in Silesia and the Kingdom of Hungary. In Pomerania, they are known as the von Pomeiske; in Silesia, as von Pomyschl. In Hungary, with its Hungarian noble predicate, as Pomichal de Réthe.

== Middle Ages ==
The first mention of the family is in 1331, as the lords of Greater and Lesser Pomeiske in Pomerania. The family, of possibly Kashubian Slavic origin, were vassals of the Order of Teutonic Knights and were required to provide two mounted knights to this force.

The arms of the family, though original, is very similar with small modifications of other ancient uradel families of Pomerania, such as the von Ahlebeck, Carnitz, Gutzmerow, Hertzberg, Podewils, Stojentin, Tauentzien, and Wopersnow. The arms may have thus formed a clan function.

The original Pomeranian line survived until the 18th century. Its most illustrious member was Nikolaus Alexander von Pomeiske (1717–1785), a cavalry general under Frederick the Great, and a Knight of the Pour le Mérite Order.

== Bohemia ==
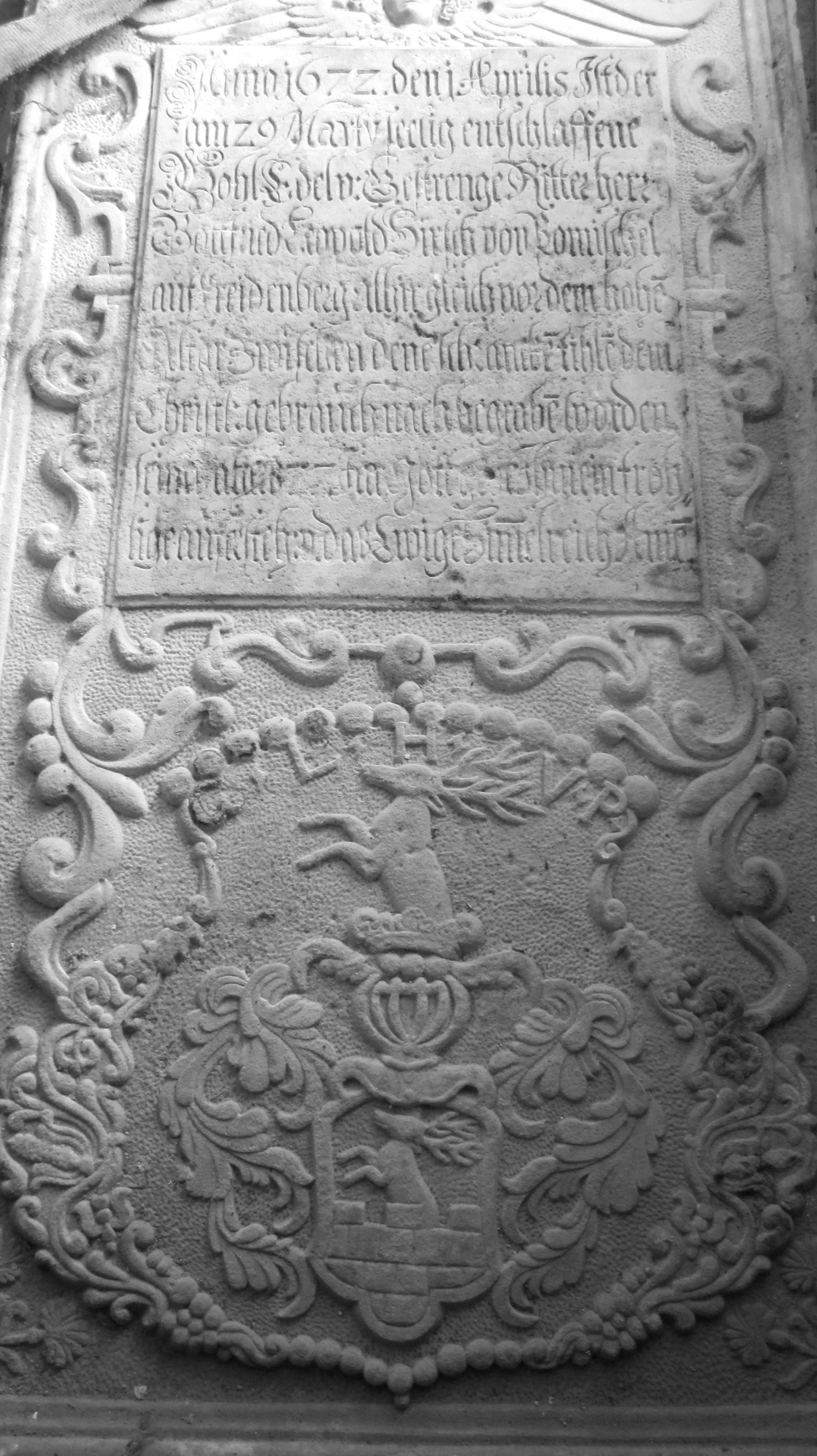
Epitaph of the "Wohl-Edel und Gestrenge Ritter Herr Gottfried Leopold Hirsch von Pomischel auf Freidenberg", 17th century, Markvartice parish church, Czech Republic

In 1616, the brothers Paul and Isaias Hirsch von Pomischel were given permission to augment their noble arms in the nobility of Bohemia by Emperor Rudolf II in Prague. The coat of arms remains the same but the surname undergoes a Slavicisation perhaps as a result of the nationalisms of the Bohemian upper class at the time.

Gottfried (Bohumir) Leopold Hirsch von Pomischel (died 1672) was the owner of the Markvartice estate in northern Bohemia in 1661–1668. Unlike his father and uncle, he was a zealous Catholic and stayed in Bohemia after the Battle of the White Mountain. Together with Zdenko, Count Kolowrat, he was the Counter-Reformation commissar in the region. After the death of Albrecht von Wallenstein, he became the hejtman of the great castle and estate of Bělá pod Bezdězem, which Wallenstein owned. He was raised from the noble to the knightly estate (Alter Ritterstand) in 1655. A carved tombstone with the Pomischel arms of Hirsch uber Schach has survived.

His son Johan von Pomischel is also buried in Markvartice.
