= Coat of arms of Słupsk =

Coat of arms of Słupsk

The coat of arms of Słupsk shows the red griffin of the Duchy of Pomerania above a stylised representation of three waves, indicating the three streams of the Słupia River as it flows through Słupsk, Poland. The city has used this device or a variant of it since the 14th century.
