= Pomysk railway station =

Railway station in Pomysk Wielki, Poland

Coordinates: 54.2083°N 17.5656°E

Pomysk

General information
- Location: Pomysk Wielki; Poland
- Owner: Polskie Koleje Państwowe S.A.

Construction
- Structure type: Building: Yes (no longer used); Depot: Never existed Water tower: Never existed

History
- Former names: Pomeiske until 1945
Location

Pomysk is a non-operational PKP railway station in Pomysk Wielki (Pomeranian Voivodeship), Poland.

== Lines crossing the station ==
Start station	End station	Line type
Lębork	Bytów	Closed
