= Dąbki =

Dąbki may refer to the following places:

- Dąbki, Greater Poland Voivodeship (west-central Poland)
- Dąbki, Masovian Voivodeship (east-central Poland)
- Dąbki, Bytów County in Pomeranian Voivodeship (north Poland)
- Dąbki, Lubusz Voivodeship (west Poland)
- Dąbki, Chojnice County in Pomeranian Voivodeship (north Poland)
- Dąbki, Człuchów County in Pomeranian Voivodeship (north Poland)
- Dąbki, West Pomeranian Voivodeship (north-west Poland)
