= Międzygórze, Pomeranian Voivodeship =

Międzygórze
- Village
- Location within Poland
- Coordinates: 54°13′54″N 17°32′34″E
- Country: Poland
- Voivodeship: Pomeranian
- County: Bytów
- Gmina: Bytów
- Population: 46

Międzygórze ([mjɛnd͡zɨˈɡuʐɛ]; German: Papenhof) is a village in the administrative district of Gmina Bytów, within Bytów County, Pomeranian Voivodeship, in northern Poland.
