= St George's Church, Bytów =

Greek Catholic Church in Pomeranian Voivodeship, Poland

Coordinates: 54°9′56.273″N 17°29′2.221″E

Saint George's Church
- Greek Catholic Church of Saint George
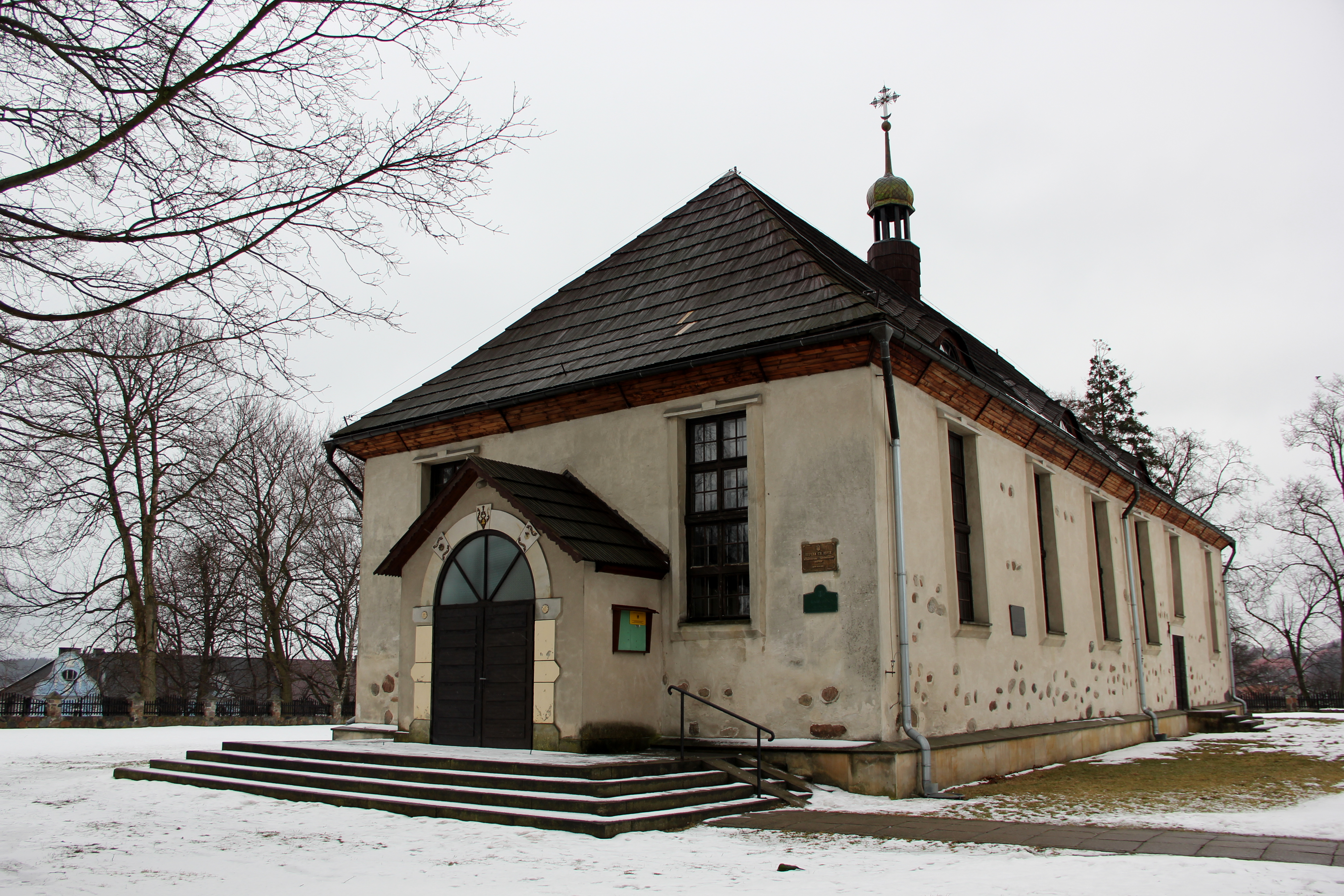
- Saint George's Church in Bytów

- Location in Poland
- Location: Josyfa Slipyja 5 Bytów, Pomeranian Voivodeship
- Country: Poland
- Denomination: Ukrainian Greek Catholic Church
- Website: www.cerkiew.ebytow.pl

History
- Former name: Bergkirche
- Status: Parish church
- Dedication: Saint George
- Consecrated: October 28, 1989

Architecture
- Functional status: Active
- Heritage designation: Monument A-16/252
- Designated: March 19, 1960
- Architectural type: Greek Catholic church
- Completed: 1675–1685

Specifications
- Materials: Brick

Administration
- Province: Ukrainian Catholic Archeparchy of Przemyśl–Warsaw
- Diocese: Ukrainian Catholic Eparchy of Olsztyn–Gdańsk
- Deanery: Gdańsk
- Parish: Saint George, Bytów

Saint George's Church in Bytów (Ukrainian: Церква Святого Юрія у Битові) is a Ukrainian Greek Catholic parish church belonging to the Gdańsk deanery of the Ukrainian Catholic Eparchy of Olsztyn–Gdańsk.

It is a church dedicated to Saint George from 1675 to 1685, formerly a Protestant temple (Bergkirche Sankt Georg), built in the characteristic half-timbered system. Currently, after a general renovation in the 1980s, it serves as a Ukrainian Greek Catholic church, where one can see a tabernacle from the 17th century from the Church of St. Paraskeva in Surochów, an iconostasis (royal doors) and a dome in Byzantine architectural style. The church was called Kashubian (services were held here in the Kashubian language).

== The temple before 1945 ==
Until the end of World War II, the temple also functioned under the patronage of Saint George, however its common name was Church on the Hill from German Bergkirche.

=== Before the Reformation period ===
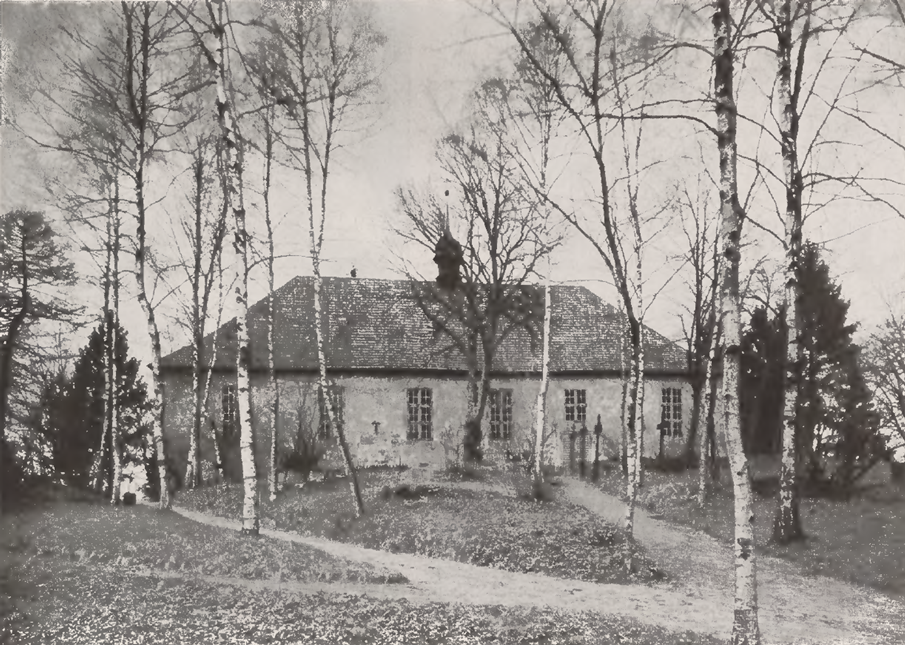
Saint George's Church before 1939.

In the place of today's church, on a hill, in the 15th century there probably originally functioned a wooden private chapel. The first mention of the temple on the hill is undated and comes from a report of the city council of Bytów, where there is mention of the construction of a chapel by Nikolaus Blome and his wife Gertrude, with the consent of the council and pastor Paul Gremlin. Nikolaus Blome is mentioned in documents from 1445 and 1472 as mayor, while Paul Gremlin was a pastor in Bytów according to documents from 1472. Based on this information, the construction of the original Saint George's chapel on the hill can be estimated around 1470.

On October 15, 1490, a confirmation of the grant to Gertrude – then already a widow after Nikolaus Blome – of the chapel "outside the walls of the city of Bytów" (extra muros opidi butow) was issued. According to a mention from June 1, 1491, in accordance with the will of the deceased Blome, pastor Georg Wolder became the heir to the chapel, who later transferred the patronage of the temple to the city council.

=== After the Reformation period ===
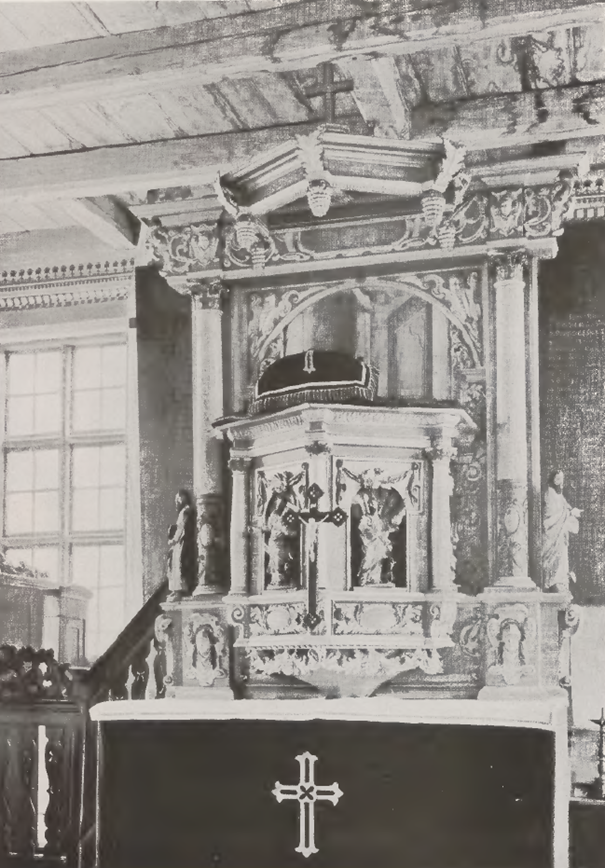
Pulpit altar from the 17th and 18th centuries

According to accounts from around 1640, the "church on the hill" (Old German aufm Berge) was built by the Protestant congregation before 1551. Possibly as a new temple on the site of the earlier chapel or possibly just renovated and expanded for new needs. The building at that time was still wooden. It was used by evangelicals from rural areas of the Bytów parish. Sermons in the local dialect were preached here by, among others, Szimón Krofey, a pastor who, with financial help from Barnim X, published "Spiritual Songs" in the Kashubian dialect in print in 1586. During the Counter-Reformation period, the right to possess a church by Protestants was effectively defended, so that throughout the period the temple belonged to them.

However, there is a mention that in the 16th century the church was converted into a barn, and in 1629 during the Polish-Swedish War (1626–1629) it was burned down, then rebuilt again in wooden construction.

On Lubinus map from 1618, one can see on the plan of the city of Bytów Saint George's church as a temple on a hill with a hip roof, sacristy and a steeple in the middle of the roof. Until 1637 the temple served as a funeral church, then as a city church until the construction of an oratory at the town hall (around 1670), temporarily also after 1700 (until the reconstruction of the burned oratory).

In 1641 the temple was in poor condition and without equipment. The poor technical condition caused it to be destroyed in 1673 due to a hurricane. The ruined church was rebuilt in the years 1675–1685 to its present form (also preserved during reconstruction in the 1980s) as a masonry building with a hip roof covered with shingles and a small steeple in the middle of the temple roof.

In 1843, after 30 years of non-use, it underwent thorough renovation due to the need to use the temple during the construction of Saint Elizabeth's church (currently Church of Saint Catherine of Alexandria and Saint John the Baptist in Bytów) in the years 1843–1854. During the renovation, among other things, the partially collapsed burial crypts were filled in and walled up.

In 1925, based on an article by Albert Rentz in Unser Pommerland – the then pastor of the parish – one can find information that the church was not used for a long time, however, at the beginning of the 1920s, Sunday masses were restored, and services were also held regularly during the week.

== The temple after 1945 ==
=== Immediately after the war ===
As a result of military actions on the Eastern Front in March 1945 (East Pomeranian Offensive), Bytów was occupied by the Red Army. According to the commission protocol (which included, among others, Bytów mayor Adam Kazimierczak and the priest of the Catholic parish Alfons Męcikowski) from March 8, 1946, the church was "in undamaged condition, except for the organ deprived of metal pipes. It was recognized that the church, built primitively and greatly worn by time, does not show greater artistic value except for ancient relics – three religious paintings, a hanging sphere – once perhaps an eternal lamp or candelabra". Subsequently, care of the church was entrusted to the parish priest.

=== In the hands of Bytów Methodists ===
In August 1947, Catholic priest Nater mentions that despite the Catholic parish possessing the Bergkirche, due to the need for thorough and costly renovation, it was not used for pastoral purposes, especially since a group of Protestants remained in Bytów and the surrounding area, who were also looking for a place for services, and the Catholics transferred the church to them for use. The group of initially about 80 evangelical faithful (mainly of German nationality) was taken over by a Methodist pastor due to personnel "shortages". The Methodist center in Bytów grew, and it was reinforced not only by local faithful but also by new settlers from central Poland. However, the temple was in poor condition, so temporarily Bytów Methodists also met in the building at Dworcowa Street 5.

The church in the 1950s was notoriously vandalized – among other things, vandals broke windows. Therefore, the pastor of the Methodist parish applied to the county national council to recognize the temple as a monument, which finally happened on March 19, 1960, when Saint George's church was recognized as a national cultural property and entered into the register of the then Koszalin Voivodeship. Then the Methodists also decided to permanently move into the temple and develop it. In 1964 or 1965, renovation was carried out in the church. However, due to waves of emigration to West Germany, additionally intensified after the signing of the Treaty of Warsaw in 1970, the Methodist congregation was depopulated and in 1972 the number of faithful was estimated at 10 people in the entire county. At that time, further devastation of the temple continued – among other things, all sculptures were stolen, doors were broken, all wooden furnishing elements were destroyed. Due to the inability to guard the monument by the then pastor Mieczysław Ostrowski (living in Słupsk), the surviving furnishing elements – including an 18th-century baptismal font, grave epitaphs, etc. were transferred as a deposit to the museum in Bytów. In the following years, more faithful of the congregation left the country, and the devastation of the temple quickly progressed to such a state that the building threatened to collapse.

=== The temple as a greek catholic church ===
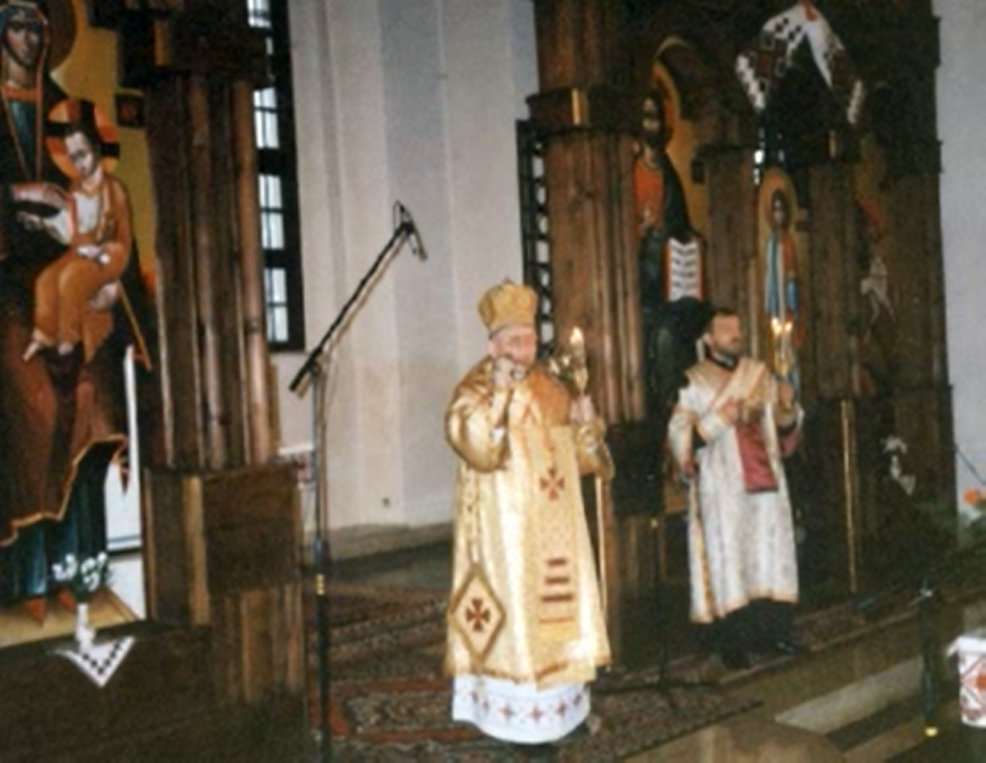
Bp. Jan Martyniak during the consecration of the church

As a result of Operation Vistula, Ukrainians appeared in the territory of Bytów County in 1947, resettled from the territories of southeastern Poland, who were mainly faithful of the Ukrainian Greek Catholic Church. The Ukrainian Greek Catholic parish was established in 1950, however the Greek Catholics did not have their own temple – liturgies were celebrated among other places in the chapel at the orphanage, private homes, and with many interruptions and troubles in Saint Catherine's church – among other things, in the Stalinist period, authorities forbade Greek Catholic priests from entering the territory of the voivodeship, which was associated with the lack of a priest in Bytów. Liturgies began to be celebrated permanently in the church from 1957, as a result of the Gomułka's thaw.

After some time, Greek Catholic faithful began to look for the possibility of building their own temple, due to the fact that the faithful of the Methodist congregation had mostly left the country – the best "candidate" was the post-evangelical Bergkirche, which however, due to progressing devastation, had fallen into ruin. The Methodists sold the building in 1982, and finally in 1984 the reconstruction of the temple began. In the second half of 1989, services began to be held in the still unfinished temple. At that time, among other things, the iconostasis, the dome crowning the steeple, and pews for the faithful were installed.

On October 28, 1989, bishop Jan Martyniak performed the solemn consecration of the church while preserving the patron of the temple – Saint George. Since then, the church has served Greek Catholics.

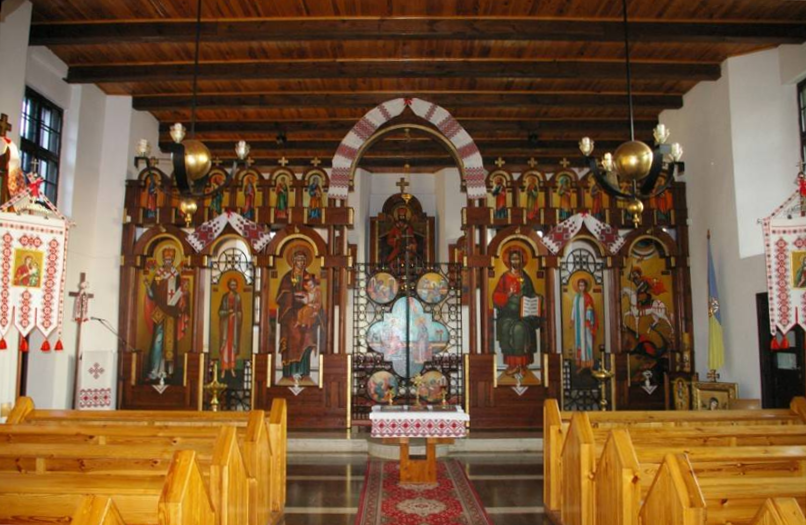
Interior of Saint George's church today
