= Szarzyn =

- Settlement
- Location within Poland
- Coordinates: 54°11′12″N 17°36′3″E
- Country: Poland
- Voivodeship: Pomeranian
- County: Bytów
- Gmina: Bytów
- Population: 20

Szarzyn ([ˈʂaʐɨn]; German: Helenendorf) is a settlement in the administrative district of Gmina Bytów, within Bytów County, Pomeranian Voivodeship, in northern Poland.
