= Bytowa =

Location
- Country: Poland

Physical characteristics
- Mouth
  - location: Słupia
  - coordinates: 54°15′00″N 17°23′30″E

Basin features
- Progression: Słupia→ Baltic Sea

Bytowa is a river of Poland, a tributary of the Słupia. It flows through Bytów.
