= Mała Wieś, Pomeranian Voivodeship =

Mała Wieś
- Village
- Location within Poland
- Coordinates: 54°11′54″N 17°36′28″E
- Country: Poland
- Voivodeship: Pomeranian
- County: Bytów
- Gmina: Bytów
- Population: 43

Mała Wieś ([ˈmawa ˈvjɛɕ]; German: Wilhelminenhof) is a village in the administrative district of Gmina Bytów, within Bytów County, Pomeranian Voivodeship, in northern Poland.
