= Szimón Krofey =

Author of works in the Kashubian language

Reverend Szimón Krofey
- Szëmòn Krofej
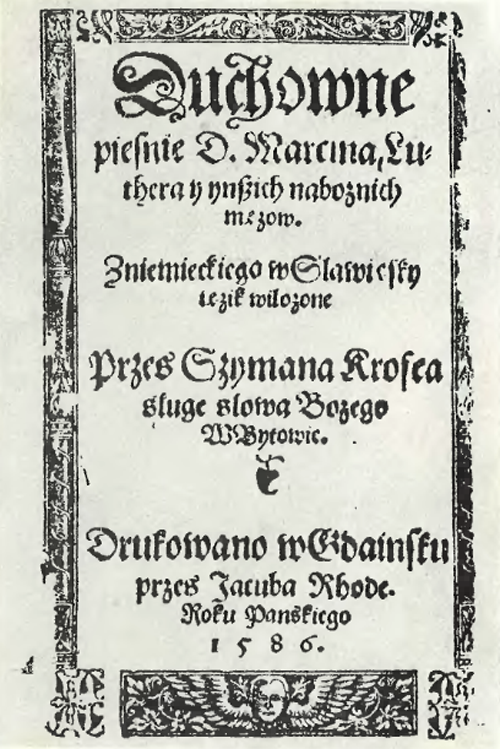
- Publication by Krofey, 1586

Personal life
- Born: 1545 Dąbie, Duchy of Pomerania
- Died: 1590 (aged 44–45)
- Parent: Wawrzyniec Krofey (father)
- Notable work: Maly katechizm
- Education: University of Wittenberg

Religious life
- Religion: Christianity
- Denomination: Lutheran
- Order: Augsburg Confession
- Church: Church on the Hill

Szimón Krofey (Kashubian: Szëmòn Krofej; born 1545) was a Lutheran vicar who is reputedly the author of the oldest known printed documents in the Kashubian language.

== Biography ==
=== Early life ===
Krofey was born in the Kashubian village of Dąbie, Pomerania. From his paternal side, he had Germanic blood from his great-great-grandfather, who married a Kashubian woman. His father, Wawrzyniec Krofey, was the mayor of Dąbie, and was well enough off to send young Szimón off to the University of Wittenberg. In 1579, after finishing his studies, he became pastor of the Lutheran Church on the Hill in Bytów.

=== Printed works ===
In 1586 and 1588, respectively, Krofey published two vitally important works in Kashubian, both of which were translations from German intended for Kashubian Lutherans: Duchowne piesnie D. Marciná Lutherá y ynßich naboznich męzow. Zniemieckiego w Slawięsky ięzik wilozone Przes Szymana Krofea, sluge slova Bozego w Bytowie (transl. Spiritual Songs of Doctor Martin Luther) and Maly katechizm D. Marciná Lutherá Niemiecko-Wándalski ábo Słowięski to jestá z Niemieckiego językáw Słowięski wystáwion (transl. Small Catechism). In 1896, the songbook was rediscovered in Smoldzino by Franz Tetner; the catechism was republished in 1643 by the Lutheran pastor Michael Brüggemann (a.k.a. Mostnik or Pontanus), Polonised in 1758, and ultimately re-Kashubised by Florian Ceynowa in 1861 as Pjnc głovnech wóddzałov evangjelickjeho katechizmu z njemjeckjeho na kaśebsko-słovjenskj jęzek.

=== Legacy ===
Scholarly opinion is divided on whether Krofey's two books were the first published in Kashubian, but the dispute hinges strictly on linguistic concerns, not historical ones. One side holds that Krofey wrote, as Józef Borzyszkowski puts it, "in Polish with abundant Kashubianisms." Jerzy Treder and Cezary Obracht-Prondzyński, on the other hand, hold that the works were written in Kashubian and therefore constitute "the origins of Kashubian literature:"

Simon Krofey can be said to have assumed a practical position, conducting his evangelisation according to the principles of the Reformation– in the language of the congregation, i.e. Kashubian. This later also prompted "more books to be translated into the tongue".

These two books are also considered important for an understanding of Slovincian, along with Brüggemann's reworking of the Small Catechism and similar texts published in 1700 by the Lutheran pastor J.M. Sporgius, also of Smoldzino.

Reverend Szimón Krofey died in 1590. To honour his undisputed importance in the history of Kashubian literature, the Bytow chapter of the Kashubian-Pomeranian Association issued a souvenir golden ducat called the Krofeya in 2009.
