= Ząbinowice =

- Village
- Location within Poland
- Coordinates: 54°9′6″N 17°32′15″E
- Country: Poland
- Voivodeship: Pomeranian
- County: Bytów
- Gmina: Bytów
- Population: 368

Ząbinowice [zɔmbinɔˈvit͡sɛ] (German: Gersdorf) is a village in the administrative district of Gmina Bytów, within Bytów County, Pomeranian Voivodeship, in northern Poland.
