= Udorpie =

Udorpie Ùdorp
- Village
- Location within Poland
- Coordinates: 54°8′35″N 17°29′23″E
- Country: Poland
- Voivodeship: Pomeranian
- County: Bytów
- Gmina: Bytów
- Population: 1,107

Udorpie ([uˈdɔrpjɛ]; Kaszubian: Ùdorp; German: Hygendorf) is a village in the administrative district of Gmina Bytów, within Bytów County, Pomeranian Voivodeship, in northern Poland.
