= Półczynek =

- Settlement
- Location within Poland
- Coordinates: 54°09′23″N 17°27′15″E
- Country: Poland
- Voivodeship: Pomeranian
- County: Bytów
- Gmina: Bytów

Półczynek [puu̯ˈt͡ʂɨnɛk] is a settlement in the administrative district of Gmina Bytów, within Bytów County, Pomeranian Voivodeship, in northern Poland.
