= Sierżenko =

- Settlement
- Location within Poland
- Coordinates: 54°6′41″N 17°29′25″E
- Country: Poland
- Voivodeship: Pomeranian
- County: Bytów
- Gmina: Bytów
- Population: 4

Sierżenko ([ɕɛrˈʐɛŋkɔ]; German: Forstamt Zerrin) is a settlement in the administrative district of Gmina Bytów, within Bytów County, Pomeranian Voivodeship, in northern Poland.
