= Przyborzyce =

- Village
- Location within Poland
- Coordinates: 54°11′6″N 17°28′35″E
- Country: Poland
- Voivodeship: Pomeranian
- County: Bytów
- Gmina: Bytów
- Population: 28

Przyborzyce [pʂɨbɔˈʐɨt͡sɛ] is a village in the administrative district of Gmina Bytów, within Bytów County, Pomeranian Voivodeship, in northern Poland.
