= Grzmiąca, Pomeranian Voivodeship =

Grzmiąca
- Village
- Location within Poland
- Coordinates: 54°12′5″N 17°26′42″E
- Country: Poland
- Voivodeship: Pomeranian
- County: Bytów
- Gmina: Bytów
- Population: 163

Grzmiąca [ˈɡʐmjɔnt͡sa] (German: Gramenz) is a village in the administrative district of Gmina Bytów, within Bytów County, Pomeranian Voivodeship, in northern Poland.
