= Gmina Bytów =

Gmina Bytów Bytów Commune
- Gmina
- Flag Coat of arms
- Interactive map of Gmina Bytów
- Coordinates (Bytów): 54°8′N 17°30′E
- Country: Poland
- Voivodeship: Pomeranian
- County: Bytów
- Seat: Bytów

Area
  - Total: 197.44 km^{2} (76.23 sq mi)

Population (2006)
  - Total: 23,568
  - Density: 119.37/km^{2} (309.16/sq mi)
  - Urban: 16,715
  - Rural: 6,853
- Website: http://www.bytow.com.pl/

Gmina Bytów is an urban-rural gmina (administrative district) in Bytów County, Pomeranian Voivodeship, in northern Poland. Its seat is the town of Bytów, which lies approximately 79 kilometres (49 mi) west of the regional capital Gdańsk.

The gmina covers an area of 197.44 square kilometres (76.2 sq mi), and as of 2006 its total population is 23,568, of which the population of Bytów is 16,715, and the population of the rural part of the gmina is 6,853.

The gmina contains part of the protected area called Słupia Valley Landscape Park.

== Villages ==
Apart from the town of Bytów, Gmina Bytów contains the villages and settlements of Brynki Rekowskie, Chomice, Dąbie, Dąbki, Gostkowo, Grzmiąca, Leśno, Mądrzechowo, Mała Wieś, Międzygórze, Mokrzyn, Nieczulice, Niezabyszewo, Płotówko, Płotowo, Półczynek, Pomysk Mały, Pomysk Wielki, Pomyski Młyn, Przyborzyce, Pustkowie Rekowskie, Pyszno, Rekowo, Rzepnica, Sarniak, Sierżenko, Sierzno, Świątkowo, Świerkówko, Szarzyn, Udorpie, Ząbinowice and Zbysław.

== Neighbouring gminas ==
Gmina Bytów is bordered by the gminas of Borzytuchom, Czarna Dąbrówka, Lipnica, Parchowo, Studzienice and Tuchomie.
