= Bystrze, Pomeranian Voivodeship =

Bystrze
- Village
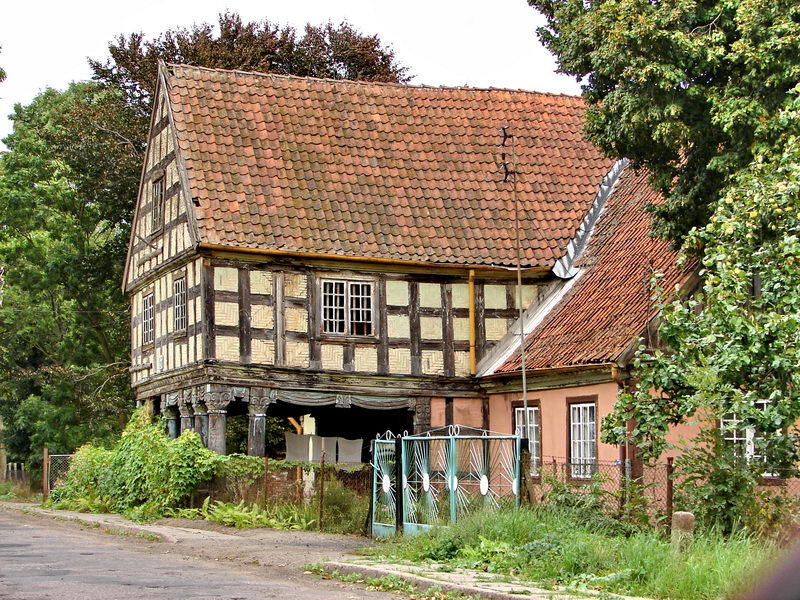
- Alcove house with arcade in Bystrze from the first quarter of the 19th century – an architectural remnant of the Olędrzy (Holländern)

- Location within Poland
- Coordinates: 54°2′5″N 18°51′18″E
- Country: Poland
- Voivodeship: Pomeranian
- County: Malbork
- Gmina: Miłoradz

Population
  - Total: 220

Bystrze [ˈbɨstʂɛ] (German: Biesterfelde) is a village in the administrative district of Gmina Miłoradz, within Malbork County, Pomeranian Voivodeship, in northern Poland.

Before 1772 the area was part of Kingdom of Poland, 1772-1919 and 1939-1945 to Prussia and Germany, and in 1920-1939 to Free City of Danzig. For the history of the region, see History of Pomerania.
