= Gmina Miłoradz =

Gmina Miłoradz Miłoradz Commune
- Gmina
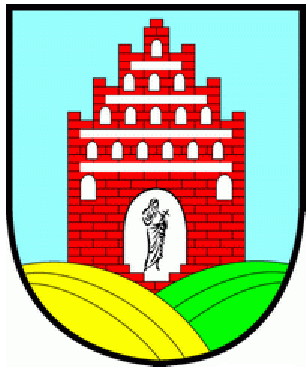
- Flag Coat of arms
- Interactive map of Gmina Miłoradz
- Coordinates (Miłoradz): 54°0′51″N 18°55′5″E
- Country: Poland
- Voivodeship: Pomeranian
- County: Malbork
- Seat: Miłoradz

Area
  - Total: 93.75 km^{2} (36.20 sq mi)

Population (2006)
  - Total: 3,427
  - Density: 36.55/km^{2} (94.68/sq mi)
- Website: http://www.miloradz.malbork.pl

Gmina Miłoradz is a rural gmina (administrative district) in Malbork County, Pomeranian Voivodeship, in northern Poland. Its seat is the village of Miłoradz, which lies approximately 8 kilometres (5 mi) west of Malbork and 44 km (27 mi) south-east of the regional capital Gdańsk.

Gmina covers an area of 93.75 square kilometres (36.2 sq mi), and as of 2006 its total population is 3,427.

== Villages ==
Gmina Miłoradz contains the villages and settlements of Bystrze, Cyganki, Gnojewo, Kłosowo, Kończewice, Mątowy Małe, Mątowy Wielkie, Miłoradz, Pogorzała Wieś, Rękowo, Stara Kościelnica and Stara Wisła.

== Neighbouring gminas ==
Gmina Miłoradz is bordered by the gminas of Lichnowy, Malbork, Pelplin, Subkowy, Sztum and Tczew.
