= Pomyski Młyn =

- Village
- Location within Poland
- Coordinates: 54°12′13″N 17°33′34″E
- Country: Poland
- Voivodeship: Pomeranian
- County: Bytów
- Gmina: Bytów
- Population: 14

Pomyski Młyn ([pɔˈmɨski ˈmwɨn]; German: Pomeisker Mühle) is a village in the administrative district of Gmina Bytów, within Bytów County, Pomeranian Voivodeship, in northern Poland.
