= Miłoradz =

- Village
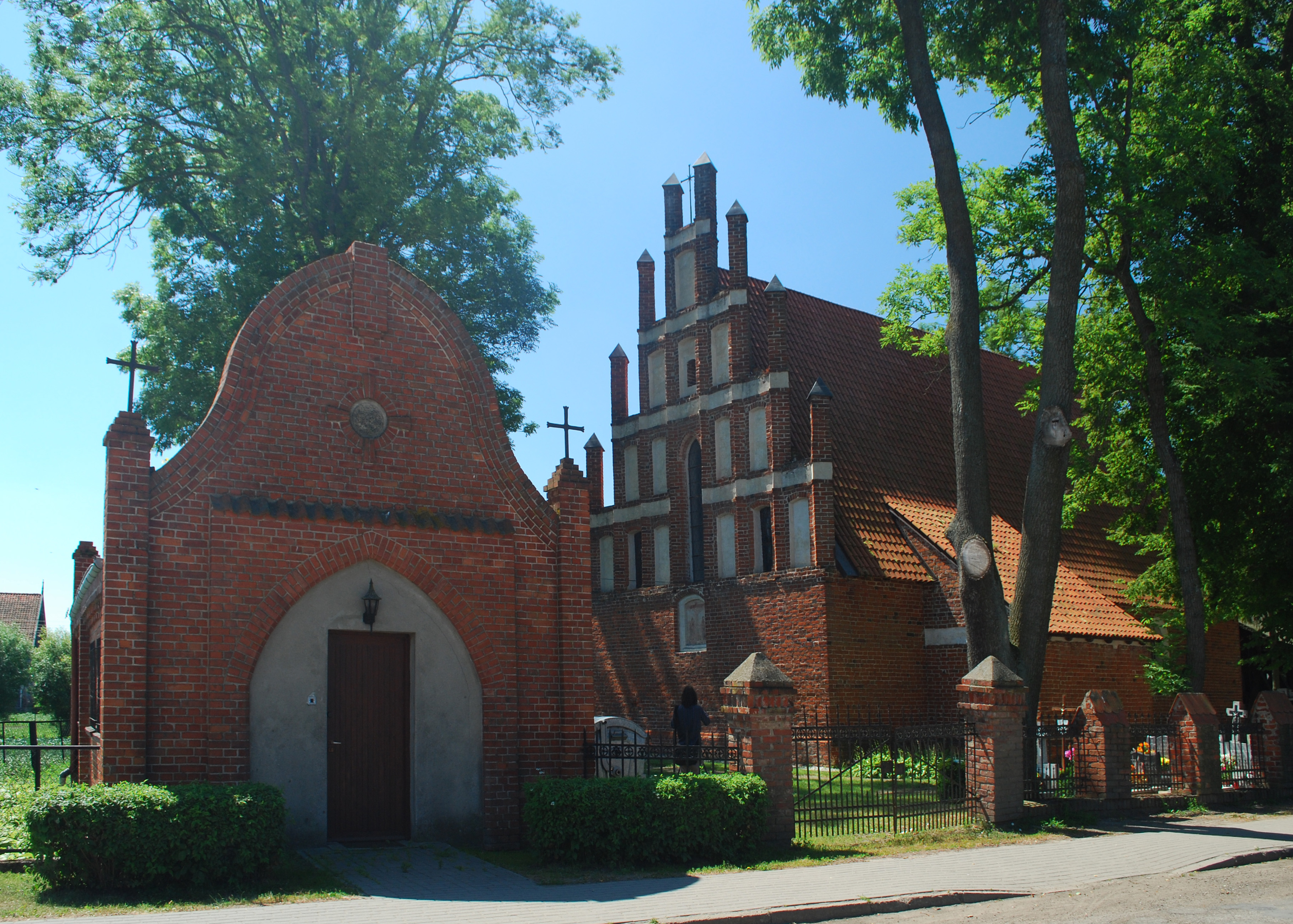
- Church of Saint Michael Archangel

- Location within Poland
- Coordinates: 54°0′51″N 18°55′5″E
- Country: Poland
- Voivodeship: Pomeranian
- County: Malbork
- Gmina: Miłoradz

Population
  - Total: 3,397

Miłoradz [miˈwɔrat͡s] (German: Mielenz) is a village in Malbork County, Pomeranian Voivodeship, in northern Poland. It is the seat of the gmina (administrative district) called Gmina Miłoradz.

For the history of the region, see History of Pomerania.
