= Brynki Rekowskie =

Settlement in Kashubia

Brynki Rekowskie Rekòwsczé Brinczi
- Przysiółek
- Location within Poland
- Coordinates: 54°7′0″N 17°26′59″E
- Country: Poland
- Voivodeship: Pomeranian
- County: Bytów
- Gmina: Bytów
- Population: 17

Brynki Rekowskie [ˈbrɨŋki rɛˈkɔfskʲɛ] (Kashubian: Rekòwsczé Brinczi; German: Reckower Brinken) is a przysiółek in the administrative district of Gmina Bytów, within Bytów County, Pomeranian Voivodeship, in northern Poland.
