= Kłosowo, Malbork County =

Kłosowo
- Village
- Location within Poland
- Coordinates: 53°58′10″N 18°52′35″E
- Country: Poland
- Voivodeship: Pomeranian
- County: Malbork
- Gmina: Miłoradz

Kłosowo [kwɔˈsɔvɔ] is a village in the administrative district of Gmina Miłoradz, within Malbork County, Pomeranian Voivodeship, in northern Poland.

Before 1772, the area was part of the Kingdom of Poland. It was part of Prussia and later Germany from 1772 to 1919, and part of the Free City of Danzig from 1920 to 1939. The area was then occupied by Nazi Germany from September 1939 to February 1945, after which it was returned to Poland.

== See also ==
- History of Pomerania
