= Płotówko =

- Village
- Location within Poland
- Coordinates: 54°6′10″N 17°24′38″E
- Country: Poland
- Voivodeship: Pomeranian
- County: Bytów
- Gmina: Bytów
- Population: 64

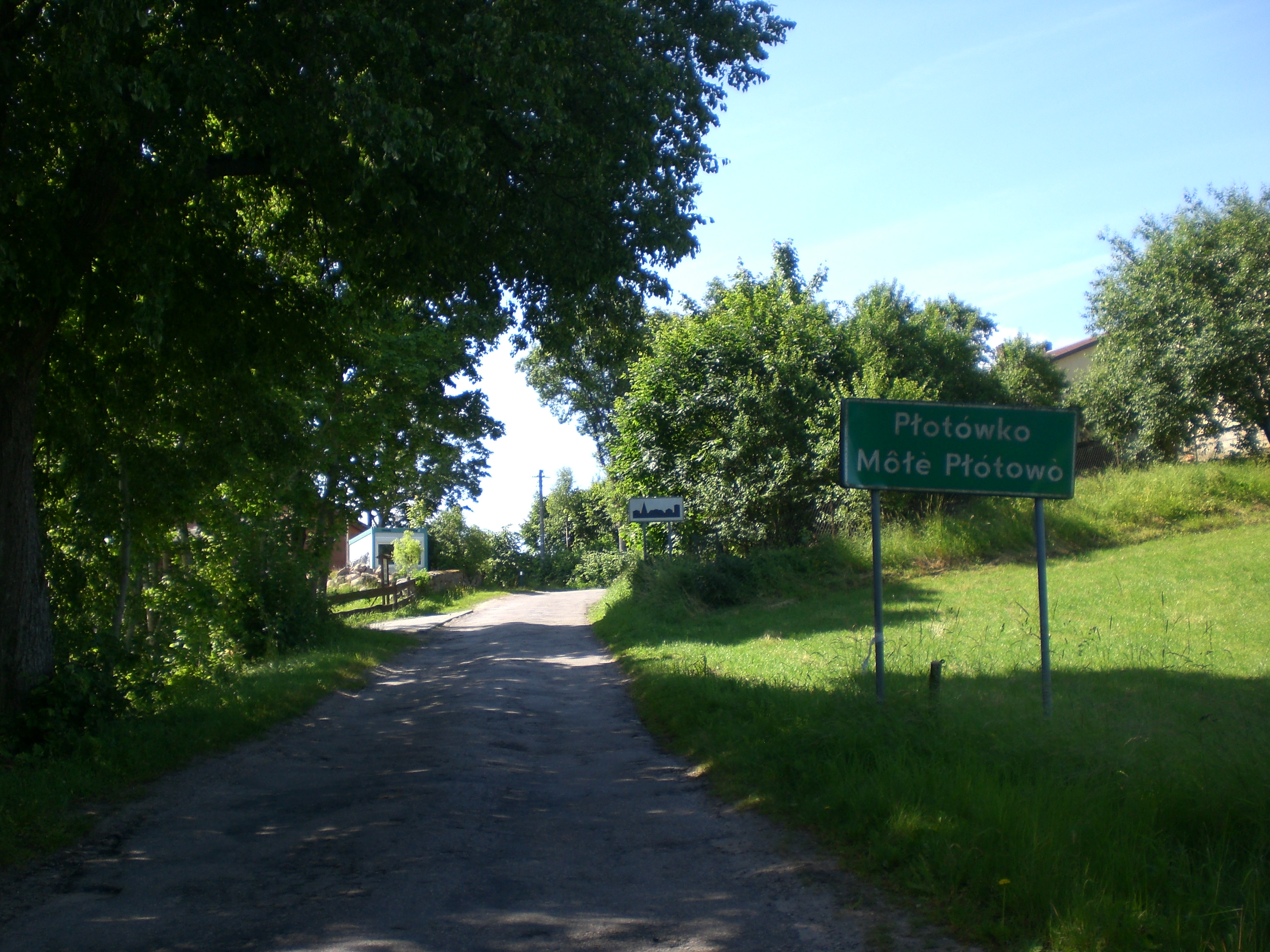
Płotówko

Płotówko (Polish pronunciation: [pwɔˈtufkɔ]; German: Klein Platenheim) is a village in the administrative district of Gmina Bytów, within Bytów County, Pomeranian Voivodeship, in northern Poland.
