= Leśno, Bytów County =

Leśno
- Village
- Location within Poland
- Coordinates: 54°15′8″N 17°33′27″E
- Country: Poland
- Voivodeship: Pomeranian
- County: Bytów
- Gmina: Bytów
- Population: 4

Leśno ([ˈlɛɕnɔ]; German: Reihershorst) is a village in the administrative district of Gmina Bytów, within Bytów County, Pomeranian Voivodeship, in northern Poland.
