= Mątowy Wielkie =

- Village
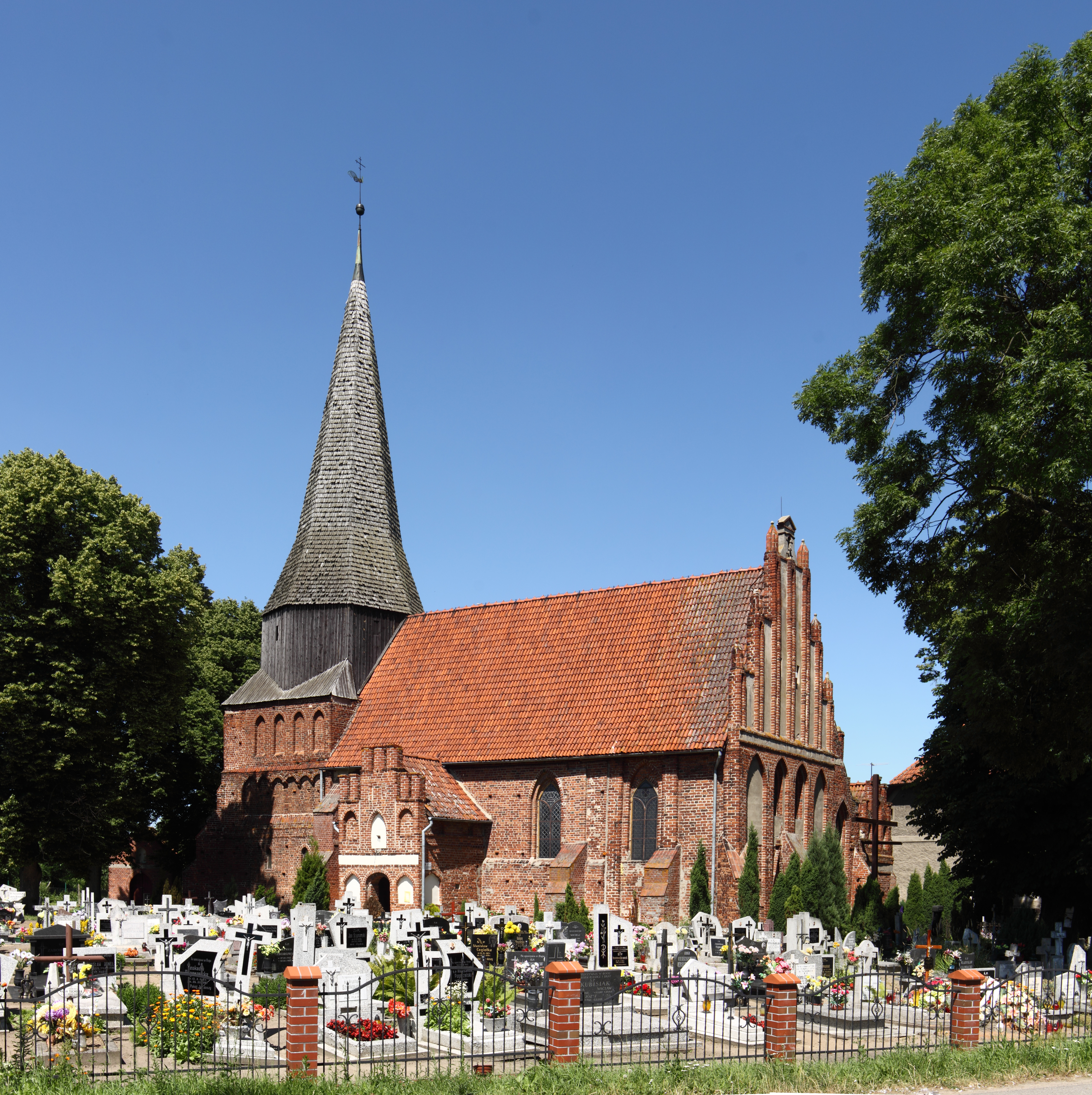
- Saints Peter and Paul Church

- Location within Poland
- Coordinates: 54°0′38″N 18°51′12″E
- Country: Poland
- Voivodeship: Pomeranian
- County: Malbork
- Gmina: Miłoradz
- Population: 353

Mątowy Wielkie [mɔnˈtɔvɨ ˈvjɛlkʲɛ] is a village in the administrative district of Gmina Miłoradz, within Malbork County, Pomeranian Voivodeship, in northern Poland. The village of 353.

The town was, in 1347, the birthplace of Saint Dorothea of Montau. Thus, a 14th-century Gothic church is located in the village which is located close to the Malbork Castle (Ordensburg Marienburg), the then the capital of the Teutonic Order's monastic state. For the history of the region, see History of Pomerania.
