= Dąbie, Gmina Bytów =

Village in Kashubia

Dąbie Dąbié
- Village
- Location within Poland
- Coordinates: 54°12′5″N 17°29′12″E
- Country: Poland
- Voivodeship: Pomeranian
- County: Bytów
- Gmina: Bytów
- Population: 188

Dąbie ([ˈdɔmbjɛ] (Kashubian: Dąbié; German: Dampen) is a village in the administrative district of Gmina Bytów, within Bytów County, Pomeranian Voivodeship, in northern Poland.

== Notable people ==
- Szimón Krofey (1545-1590), pastor and publisher of Kashubian-language Lutheran texts
