= Mokrzyn =

- Village
- Location within Poland
- Coordinates: 54°9′18″N 17°34′39″E
- Country: Poland
- Voivodeship: Pomeranian
- County: Bytów
- Gmina: Bytów
- Population: 149

Mokrzyn ([ˈmɔkʂɨn]; German: Petersdorf) is a village in the administrative district of Gmina Bytów, within Bytów County, Pomeranian Voivodeship, in northern Poland.
