= Świątkowo, Pomeranian Voivodeship =

Świątkowo
- Village
- Location within Poland
- Coordinates: 54°10′56″N 17°26′44″E
- Country: Poland
- Voivodeship: Pomeranian
- County: Bytów
- Gmina: Bytów
- Population: 151

Świątkowo (Polish: [ɕfjɔntˈkɔvɔ]; German: Luisenhof) is a village in the administrative district of Gmina Bytów, within Bytów County, Pomeranian Voivodeship, in northern Poland.
