= Rzepnica =

- Village
- Location within Poland
- Coordinates: 54°11′1″N 17°30′49″E
- Country: Poland
- Voivodeship: Pomeranian
- County: Bytów
- Gmina: Bytów
- Population: 525

Rzepnica ([ʐɛpˈnit͡sa]; German: Groß Zechinen) is a village in the administrative district of Gmina Bytów, within Bytów County, Pomeranian Voivodeship, in northern Poland.
