= Bytów =

Town in Pomeranian Voivodeship, Poland

Bytów Bëtowò (Kashubian)
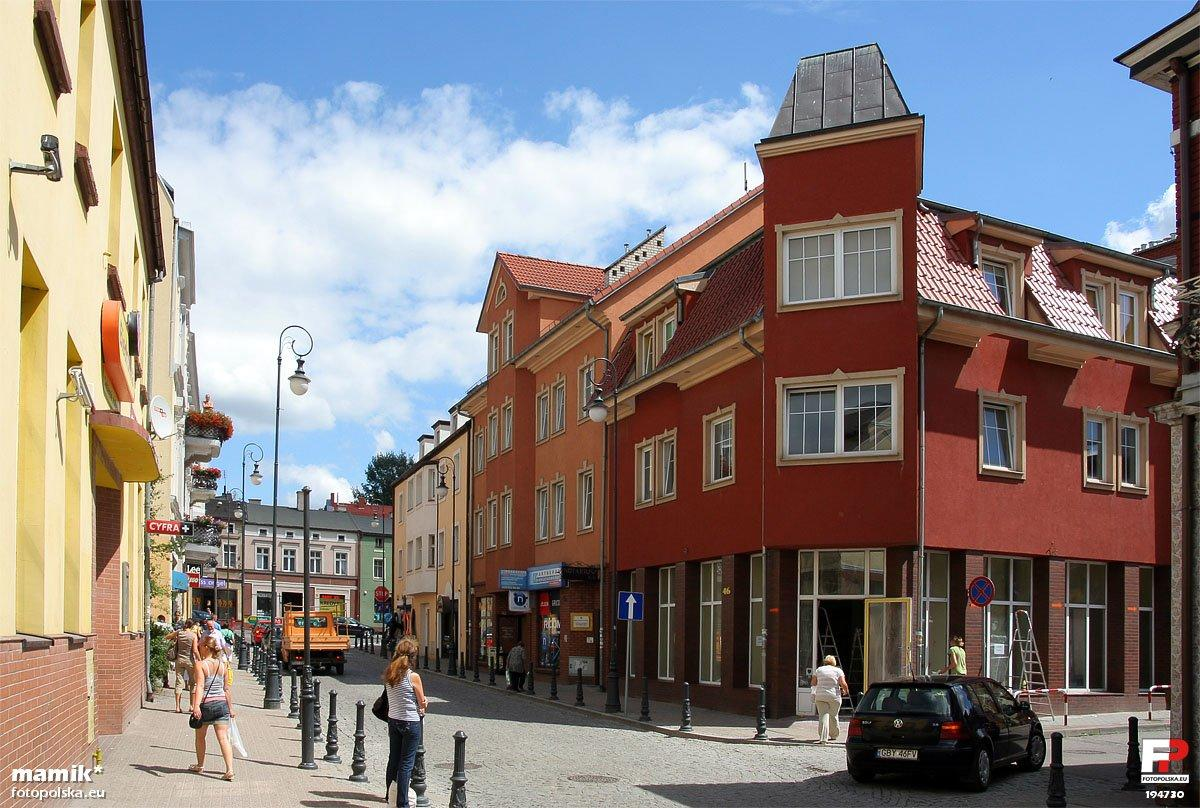
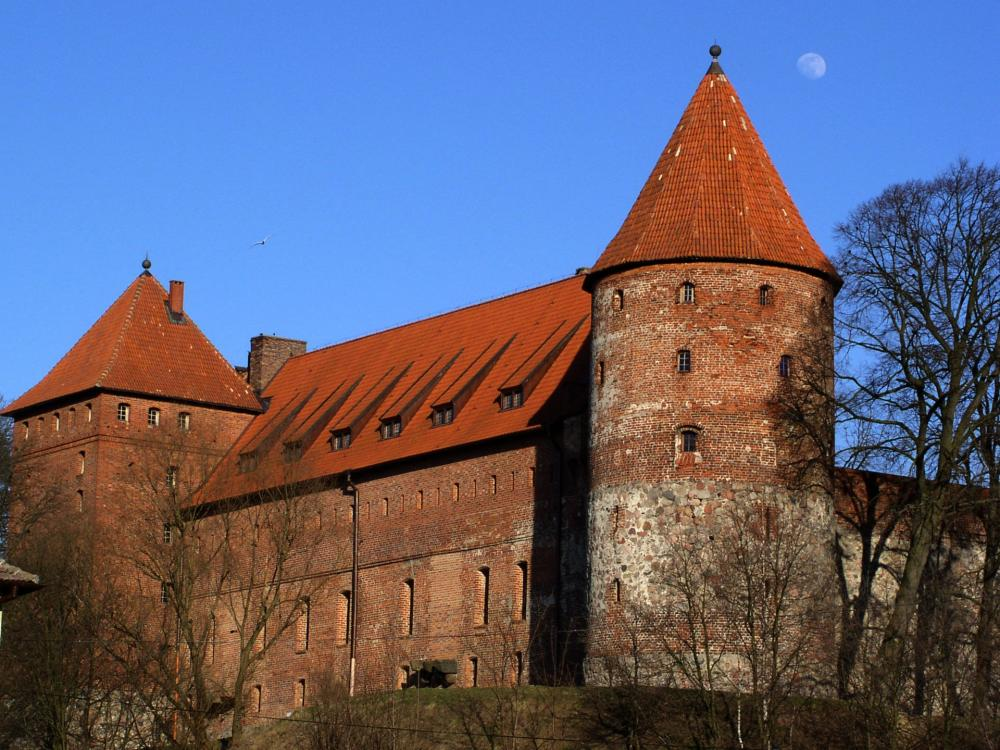
- Old Town (top) and Bytów Castle (bottom)

- Flag Coat of arms

- Location within Poland
- Coordinates: 54°8′N 17°30′E
- Country: Poland
- Voivodeship: Pomeranian
- County: Bytów
- Gmina: Bytów
- First mentioned: 12th century
- Town rights: 1346

Government
  - Mayor: Ryszard Sylka

Area
  - Total: 8.72 km^{2} (3.37 sq mi)

Population (31 December 2021)
  - Total: 16,730
  - Density: 1,920/km^{2} (4,970/sq mi)
- Time zone: UTC+1 (CET)
  - Summer (DST): UTC+2 (CEST)
- Postal code: 77-100
- Area code: +48 59
- Car plates: GBY
- Website: www.bytow.com.pl

Bytów (Polish: [ˈbɨtuf]; Kashubian: Bëtowò; German: Bütow [ˈbyːtoː]) is a town in the Gdańsk Pomerania region of northern Poland with 16,730 inhabitants as of December 2021. It is the capital of Bytów County in the Pomeranian Voivodeship.

In the early Middle Ages a fortified stronghold stood near the town. In 1346 as Bütow it obtained Kulm law rights from the Teutonic Order, which controlled it since 1329. During the Thirteen Years' War (1454–1466), the town was the site of heavy fighting and changed hands over time. Eventually, King Casimir IV Jagiellon granted the town to Eric II, Duke of Pomerania, as a perpetual fiefdom. After the Partitions of Poland, Bytów became part of the Kingdom of Prussia and later also Germany, within which it remained until the end of World War II. In the final stages of the war Bytów heavily shelled by the Red Army, and more than 55% of the buildings were destroyed.

== History ==
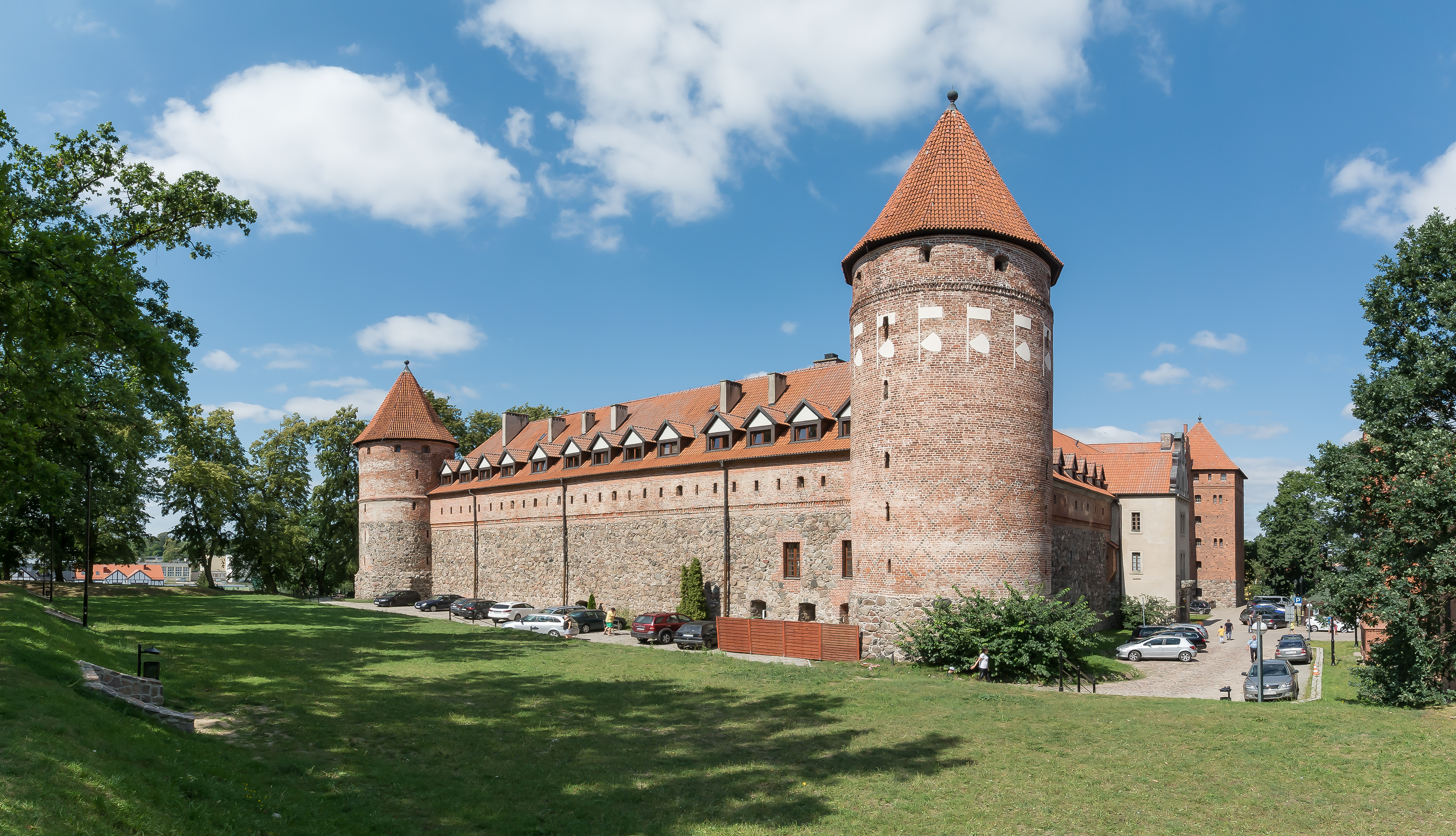
Bytów Castle, built in 1399–1405

According to the city's official webpage the name Bytów comes from the founder of the settlement named "Byt". A settlement was first mentioned by the name of Butow in 1321.

The territory became part of the Duchy of Poland under its first historic ruler Mieszko I in the 10th century. Bytów passed to the Teutonic Knights in 1329. From 1335 comes the oldest mention of a Catholic parish, which, however, could have existed since the 12th or 13th century. In 1346 it was granted town rights. The castle seen today was built by the Knights between 1399 and 1405 at the site of the older castle, to protect their western border. It has been the seat of an administrator of the State of the Teutonic Knights.

This castle was captured by Poland after the Battle of Grunwald (1410), and king Władysław II Jagiełło of Poland gave it to Bogislaw VIII, Duke of Pomerania, for all of his lifetime as payment for support obtained from him against the Teutonic Knights. In the Peace of Thorn (1411) Bogislaw had to return the castle to the Knights. The town did not join the Prussian Confederation's revolt against the Teutonic Knights.

The town alternated between Poland and the monastic state during the Polish-Teutonic Wars, and returned to Polish control after the Second Peace of Thorn (1466). Poland gave Bytów as lien to the Dukes of Pomerania. Since 1526 the Pomerania dukes held it as an inheritable lien.

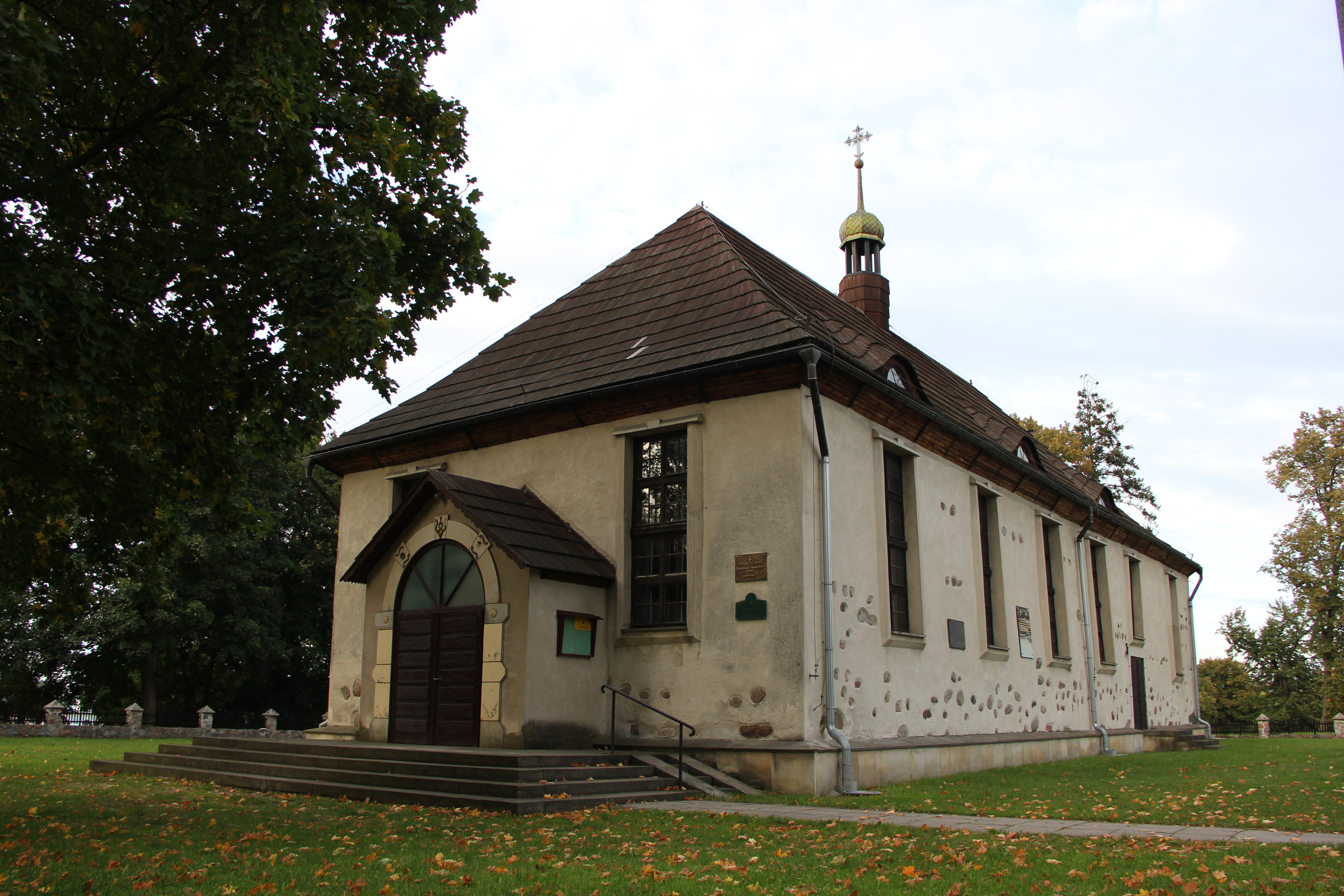
St George's Greek catholic church, built in the 17th century

In 1627 during the Thirty Years' War, the town was rebuilt after being destroyed by a fire. When the Pomeranian dukes died out in 1637 Bytów ceased to be a Polish fief and became directly ruled by Poland, administratively part of the Pomeranian Voivodeship. Then the local nobility obtained equal rights with the nobility of the entire Polish–Lithuanian Commonwealth. Bytów was overshadowed by Lębork, which developed faster and became the seat of local starosts. In 1651 there was a dispute between the city authorities and the starost Jakub Wejher, regarding overdue taxes. To gain an ally against Sweden during the Deluge, in 1657 King John II Casimir of Poland gave the Lauenburg and Bütow Land to Margrave Frederick William of Brandenburg-Prussia as a hereditary fief in the Treaty of Bydgoszcz. Although Poland still retained sovereignty, the town was administered by Brandenburg and, after 1701, by the Kingdom of Prussia. Brandenburg imposed higher taxes to pay off its debts after the Thirty Years' War. During the 18th century, the town suffered from fires and plague.

In 1773 in the First Partition of Poland the town was wholly incorporated in the Prussian Province of Pomerania. In the 18th century attempts began at Germanisation of the indigenous Polish-Kashubian population by introducing German into schools. It remained a center of Polish resistance against Germanisation and was a Polish-Kashubian printing center. From 1846 to 1945, Bütow was the seat of the Landkreis Bütow district in Prussia. The town became part of the German Empire in 1871 during the Prussian-led unification of Germany. Polish minority remained active in the city, and in 1910 a Polish Bank Ludowy was founded here.

After the end of World War I and the re-establishment of independent Poland, the Treaty of Versailles kept the town in the Weimar Republic in 1919. There was an economic decline, many Germans emigrated to western Germany, and the population was slowly decreasing. In the interbellum numerous Polish organizations, including the Union of Poles in Germany, operated in the town. Poles were subjected to repressions. The hero of the local Polish population was a local Polish teacher, Jan Bauer, who was arrested by the Germans in 1929. Months before World War II, in 1939, the Germans carried out arrests of notable local Poles, incl. activists and the head of the local Polish bank.

During World War II the Polish population was subject to deportations and executions, two of its leaders, Jan Rekowski-Styp and Józef Rekowski were imprisoned in Sachsenhausen and Dachau concentration camps, however, the town remained a local center of the Polish resistance movement (Kashubian Griffin). In January 1945, a German-perpetrated death march of Allied prisoners-of-war from the Stalag XX-B POW camp passed through the town. It was captured by the Soviet Red Army on 8 March 1945. Some inhabitants had fled before the Soviet advance. In April 1945, it was put under Polish administration, confirmed after the end of the war by the Potsdam Conference and the Polish name Bytów was restored. Those German inhabitants, which had remained in the town or had returned to it short after the war, were later on expelled in accordance with the Potsdam Agreement. The indigenous Polish-Kashubian population was joined by Poles displaced from former eastern Poland annexed by the Soviet Union and from the rest of Kashubia.

Bytów became the seat of a powiat (1946–1975, 1999-) within Poland. From 1975 to 1998 it was administratively part of the Słupsk Voivodeship.

=== Kashubian Emigration to America ===
Many families from Bytów such as the Brezas and the Pehlers emigrated to the area of Winona, Minnesota in the United States, beginning in 1859. The Prussian policy was to force the Kashubians out to make room for German settlers. Some Kashubians moved across the Mississippi River to Pine Creek, Wisconsin in the early 1860s. Many found jobs in the lumber mills during the lumber boom of the late 1800s occurring in the region.

== Demographics ==
Following the medieval Christianization of the region, most inhabitants of the town were Catholics, and after the Reformation until the end of World War II most inhabitants were Protestants.

Number of inhabitants by year

Year	Number
1782	990
1794	1,085
1812	1,217
1816	1,395
1831	2,062
1852	3,509
1861	4,247
1875	5,820
1900	6,487
1925	8,890
1960	8,600
1970	10,700
1975	12,500
1980	13,300
2011	20,943
2021	16,730

The above table is based on primary, possibly biased, sources.

== Sights ==
- Bytów Castle, housing the West Kashubian Museum (Muzeum Zachodniokaszubskie)

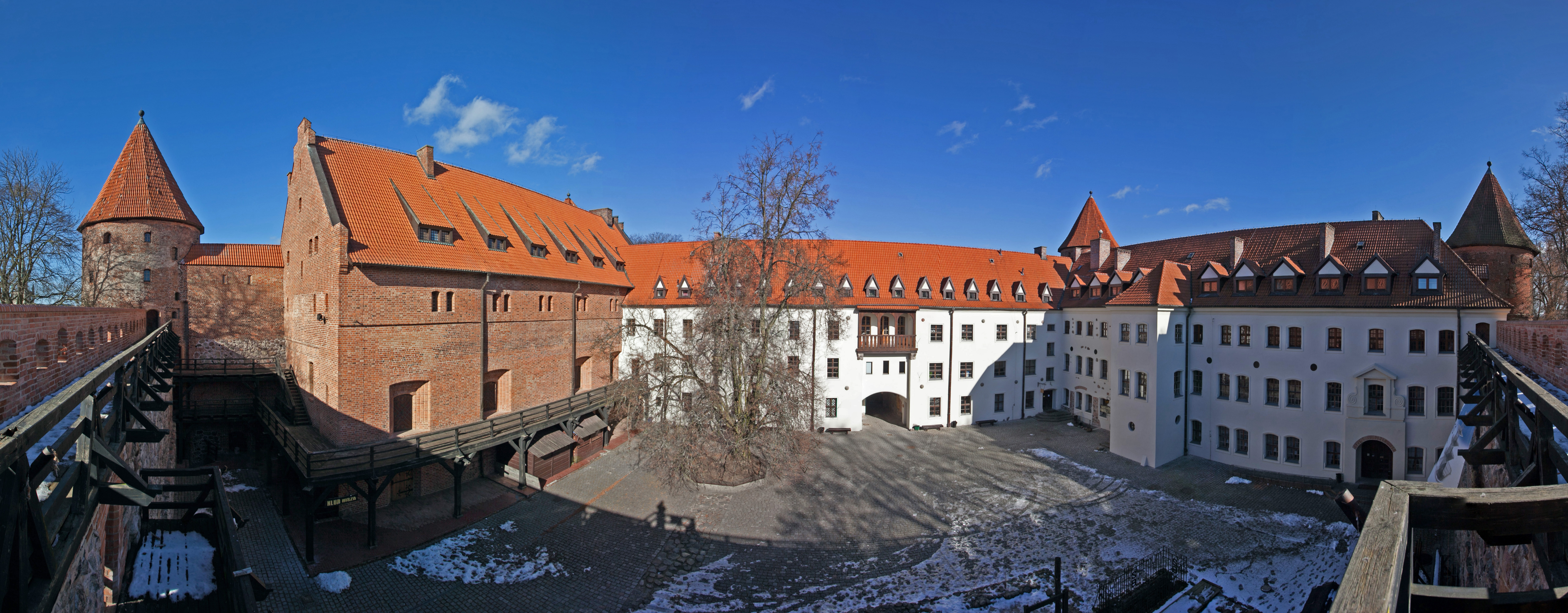
Courtyard of the Bytów Castle

== Sports ==
Polish football club Bytovia Bytów is based in Bytów.

== Notable residents ==
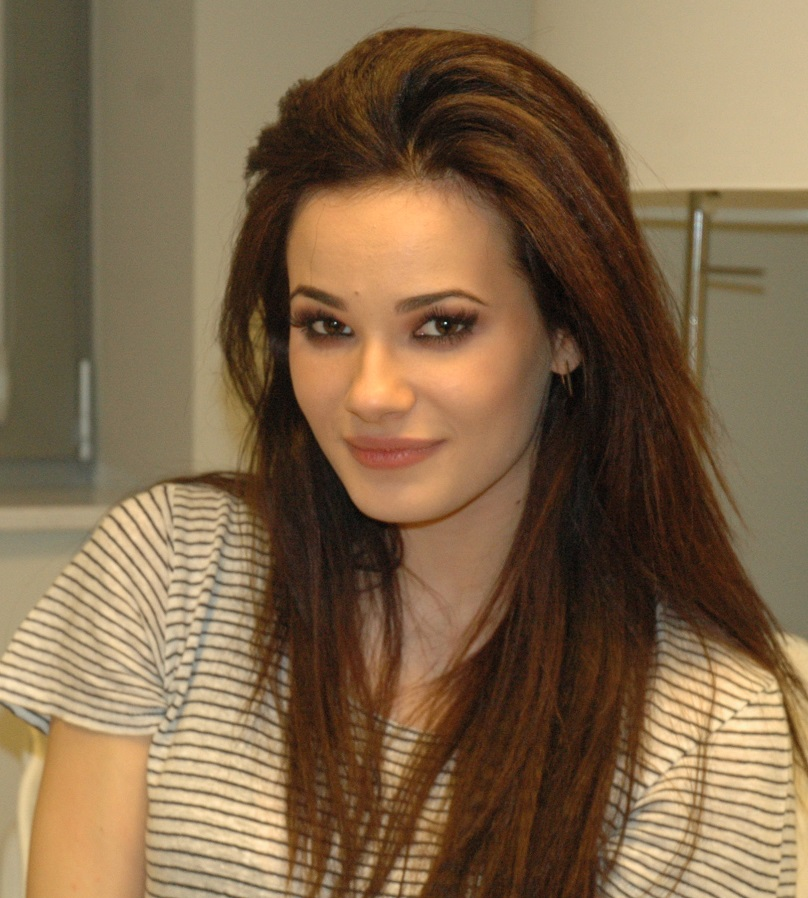
Natalia Szroeder, 2016

- Szimón Krofey (1545–1589), Polish-Kashubian pastor, teacher and publisher
- Adolph Ferdinand Gehlen (1775–1815) German chemist, died from arsenic poisoning in Munich age 39
- Georg Warsow (1877-??) a German road racing cyclist who competed in the 1912 Summer Olympics
- Wilhelm Abel (1904–1985), German economist, particularly agricultural economics and economic history.
- Hansjoachim Walther (1939–2005), politician, became member of the Third Kohl cabinet
- Natalia Szroeder (born 1995) a Polish singer, songwriter and TV presenter
- Kamil Małecki (born 1996) a Polish professional racing cyclist

== Twin cities ==
Bytów is twinned with:

Frankenberg, Hesse, Germany; Gdańsk, Poland; Markaryd, Sweden	(United States) Winona, Minnesota, USA; Zalischyky, Ukraine

One regular activity is the exchange of high school students between Bytów and Winona.

== Municipality of Bytów ==
Sołectwos in the urban-rural commune (gmina) of Bytów include: Dąbie, Gostkowo, Grzmiąca, Mądrzechowo, Mokrzyn, Niezabyszewo, Płotowo, Pomysk Mały Pomysk Wielki, Rekowo, Rzepnica, Sierżno, Świątkowo, Udorpie, Ząbinowice.

== Gallery ==
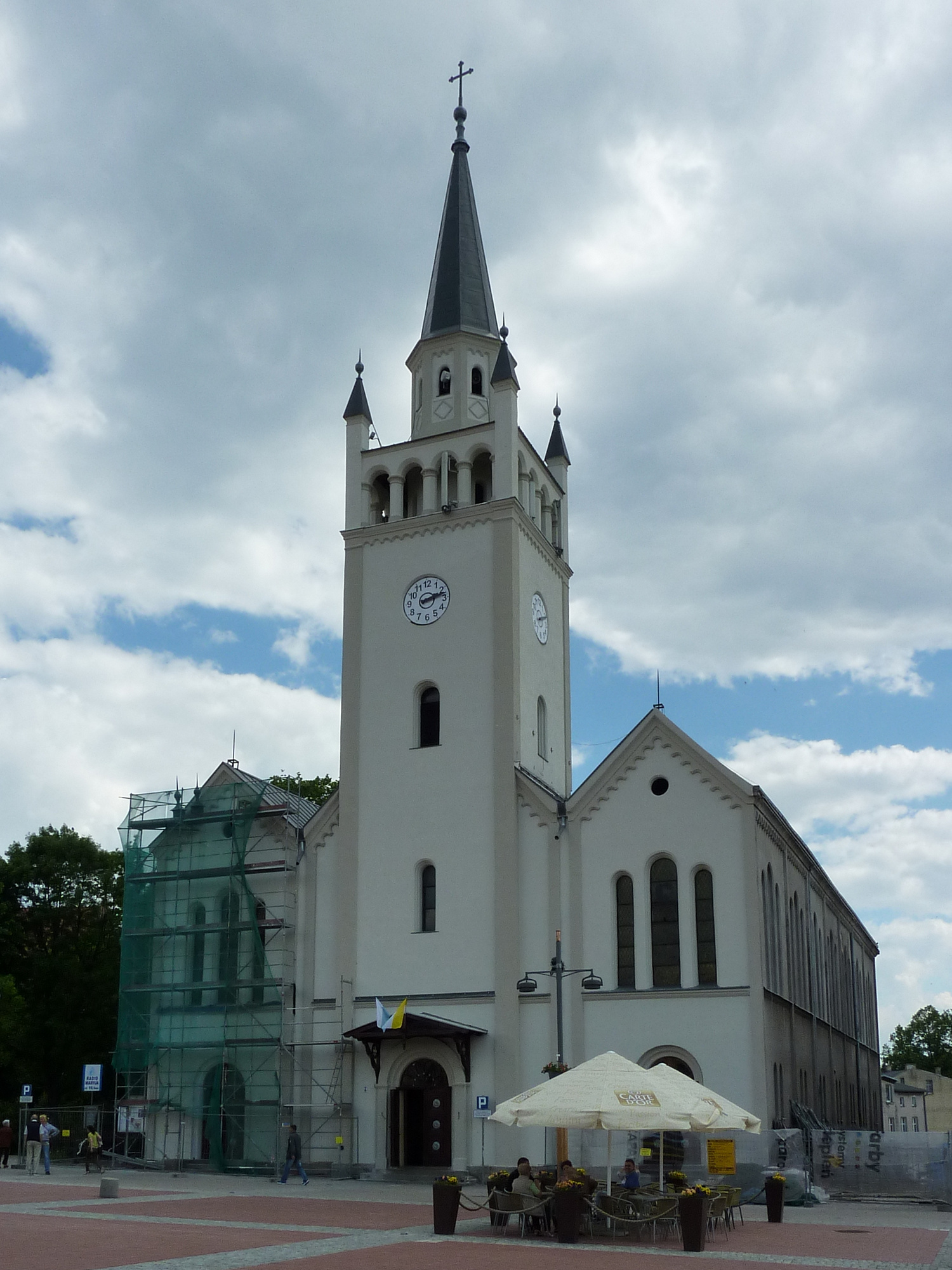
Saints Catherine and John the Baptist Church

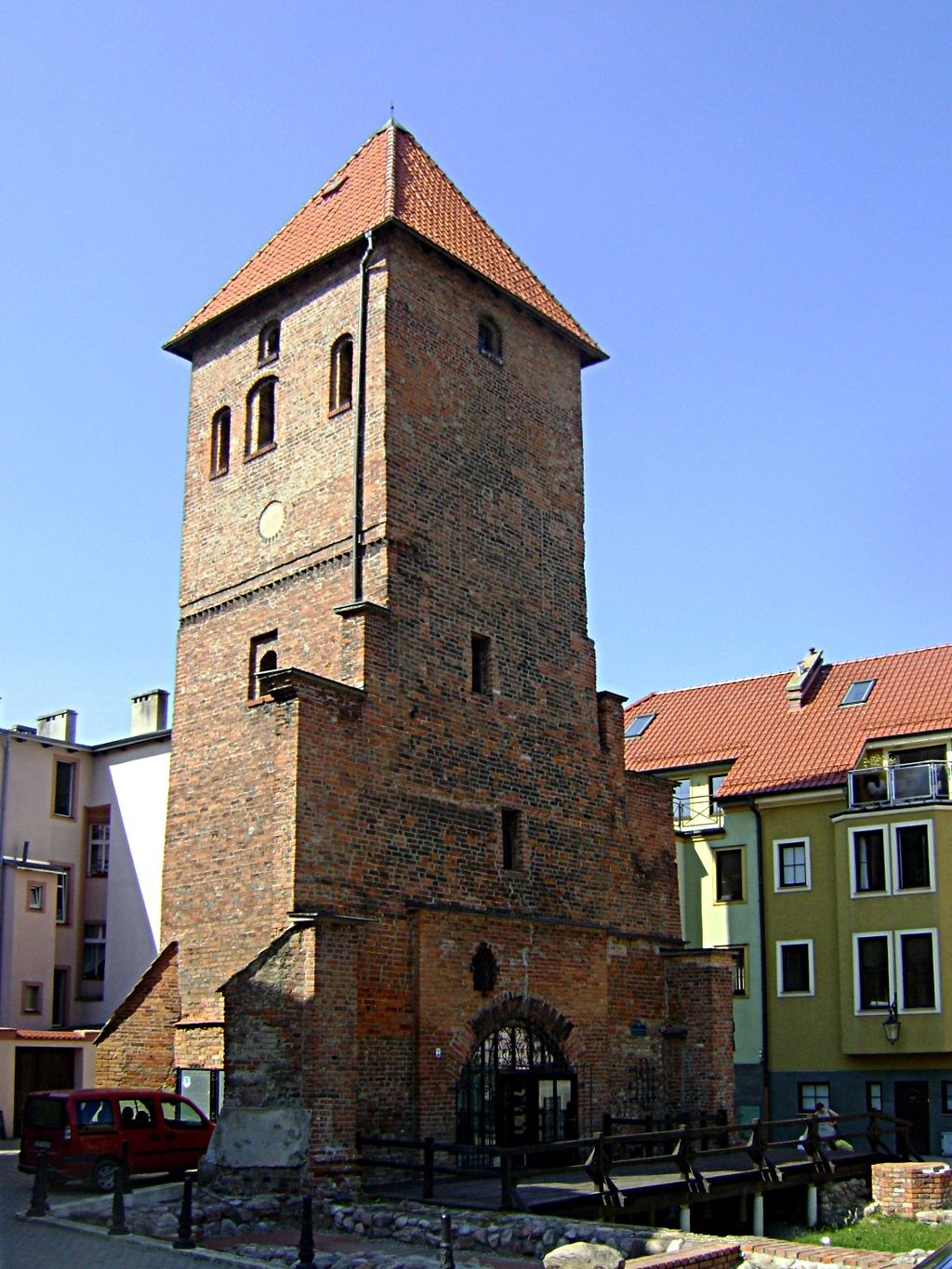
Tower of St. Catherine Church

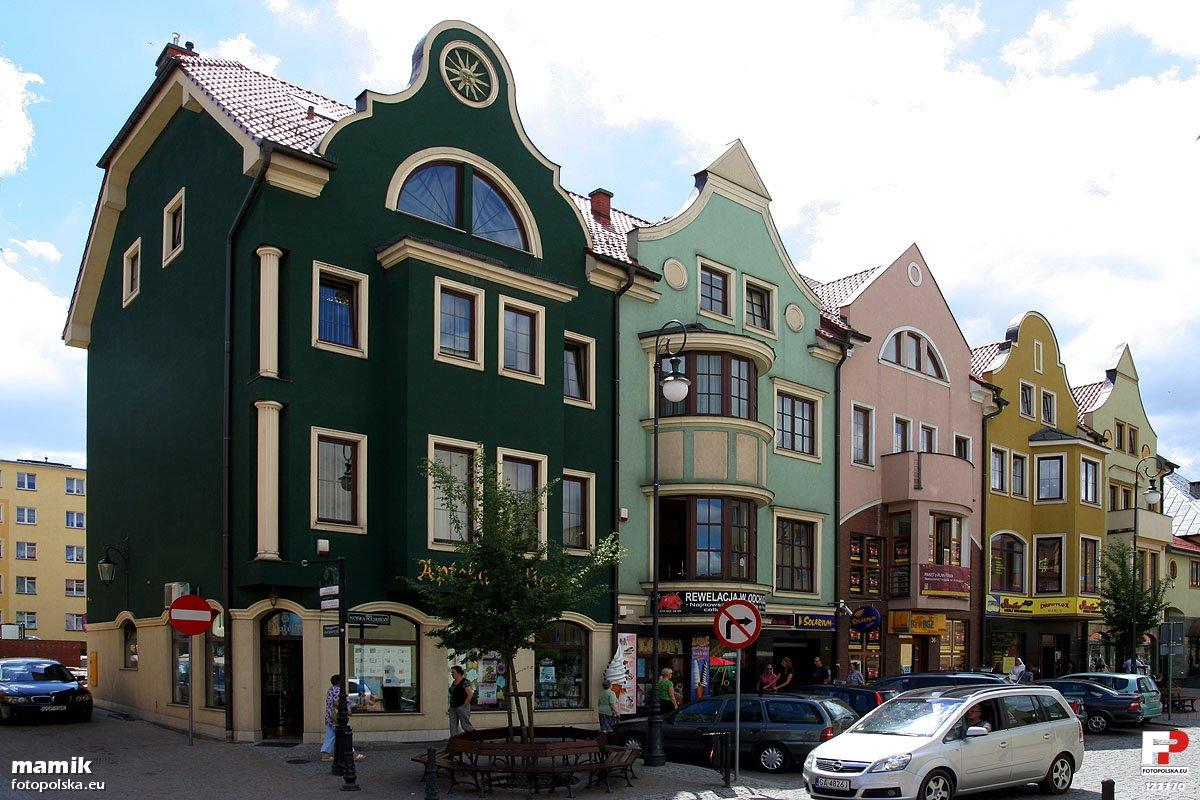
Town centre

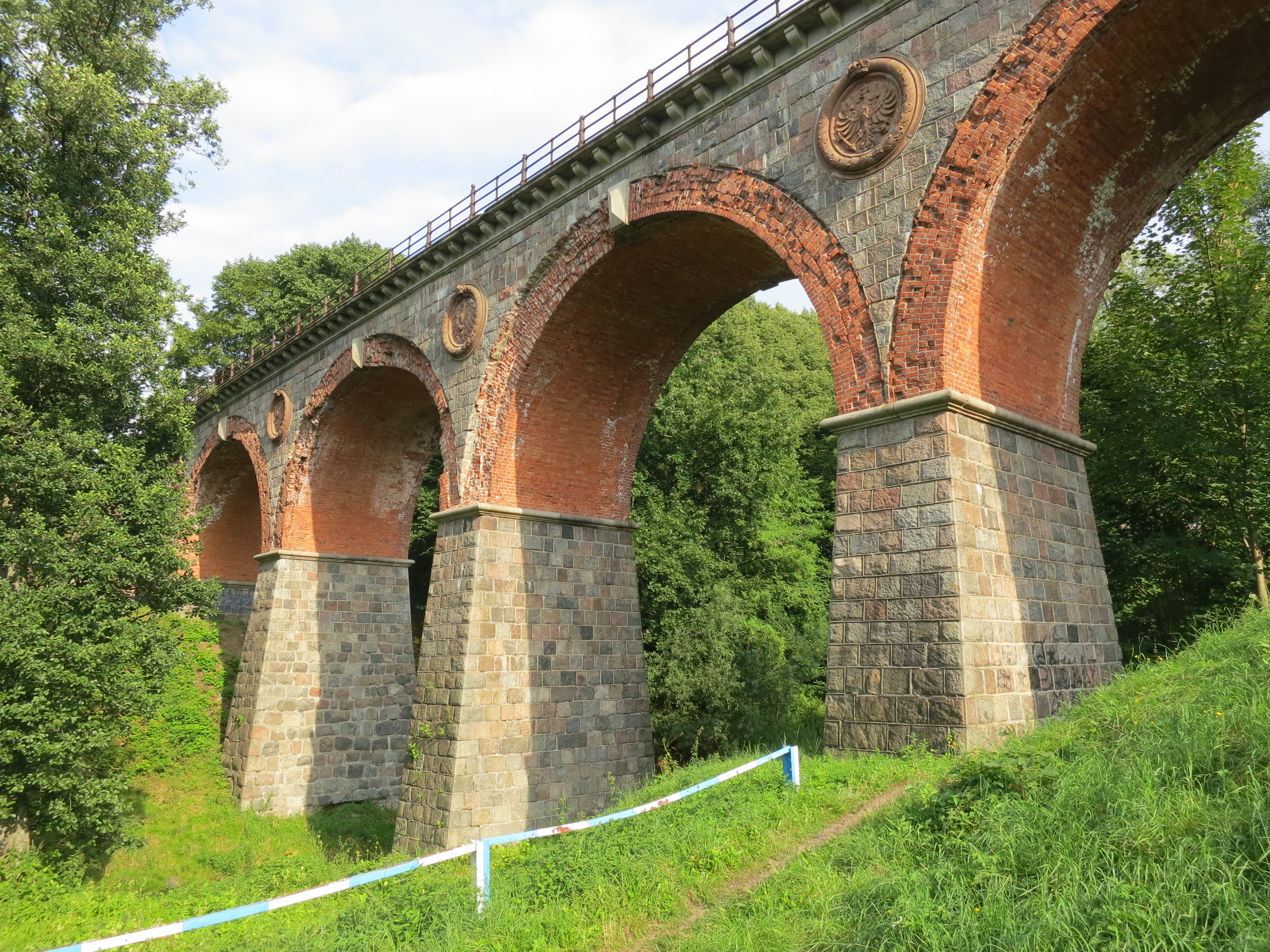
Railway bridge in Bytów

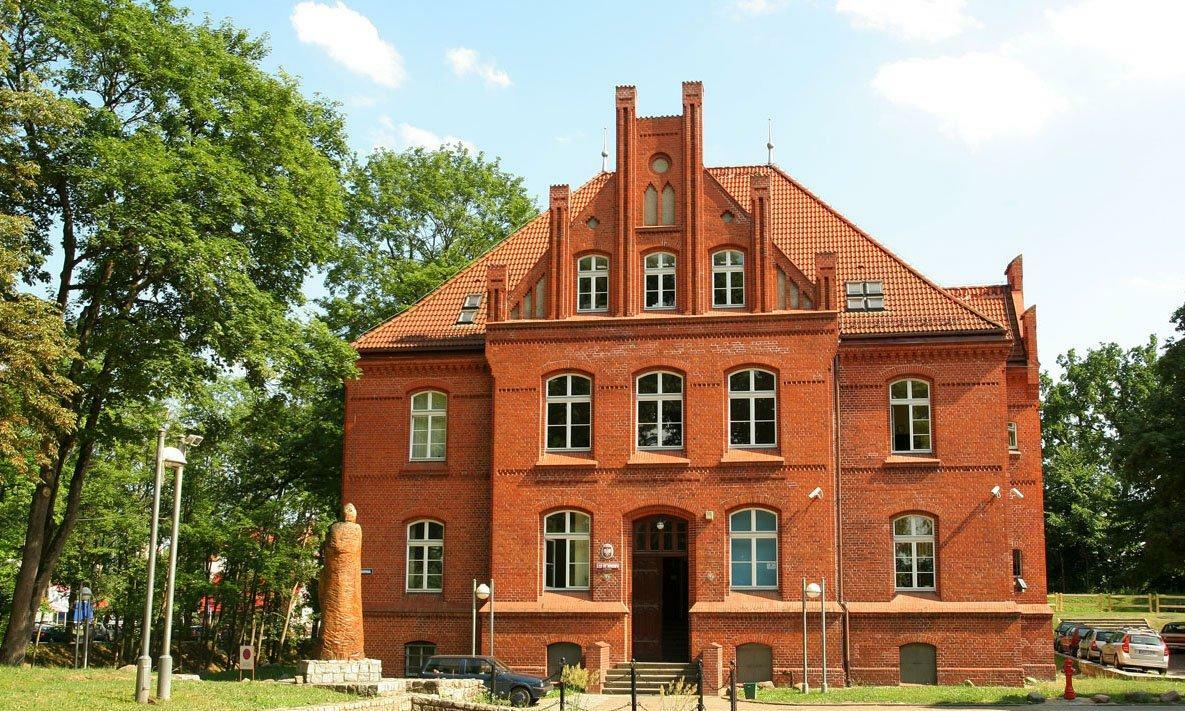
District court

== See also ==
- Lauenburg and Bütow Land
- Bytowa, a river
