= Nieczulice, Pomeranian Voivodeship =

Nieczulice
- Village
- Location within Poland
- Coordinates: 54°9′37″N 17°26′16″E
- Country: Poland
- Voivodeship: Pomeranian
- County: Bytów
- Gmina: Bytów
- Population: 29

Nieczulice ([ɲɛt͡ʂuˈlit͡sɛ]; German: Katharinenfelde) is a village in the administrative district of Gmina Bytów, within Bytów County, Pomeranian Voivodeship, in northern Poland.
