= Dorothea of Montau =

Anchoress and visionary of 14th century Prussia

Blessed Dorothea of Montau
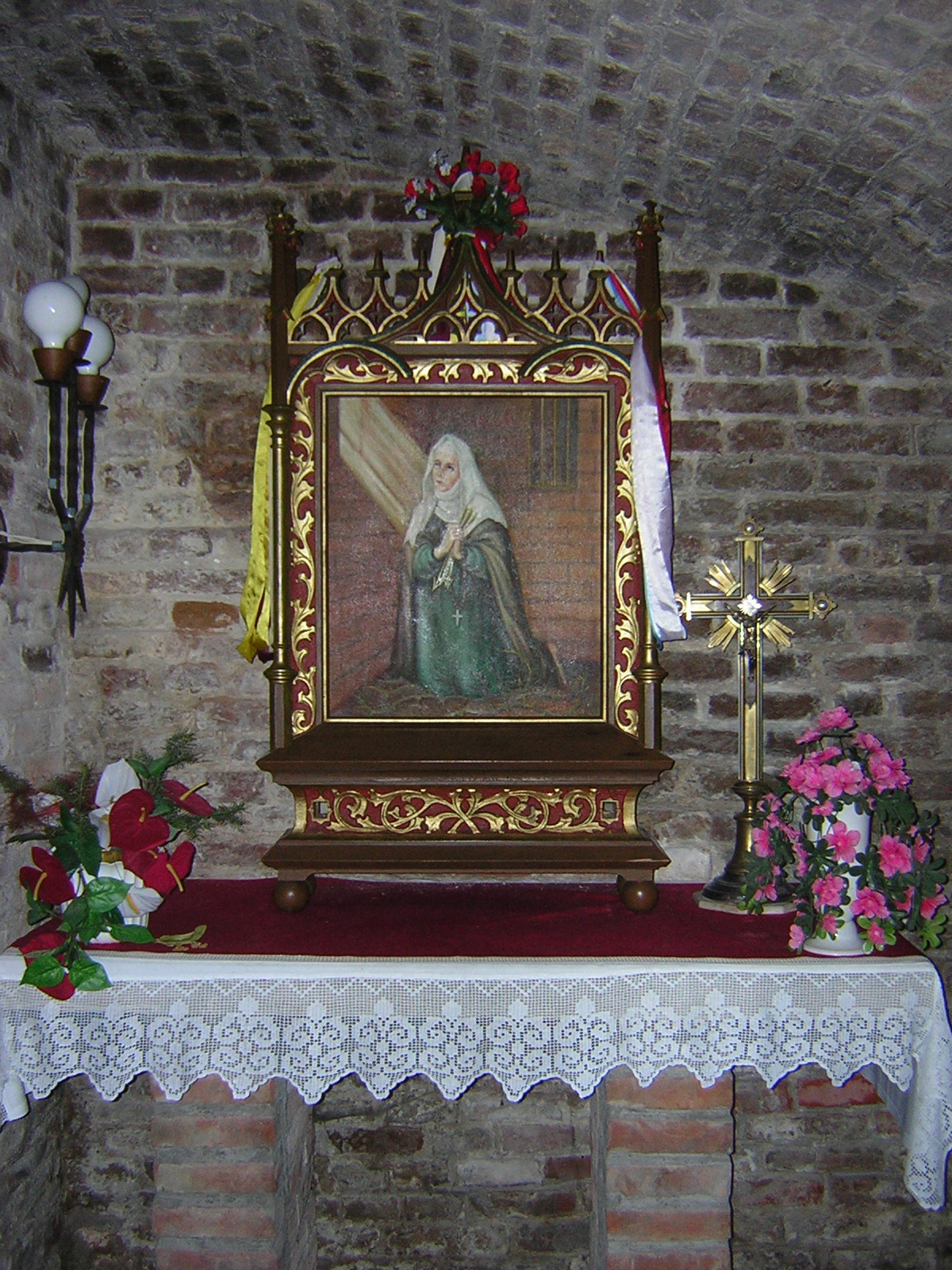
- Cell of Dorothea of Montau in Kwidzyn, Poland

Anchoress, Mystic, Virgin, and Visionary
- Born: 6 February 1347; Groß Montau, Prussia
- Died: 25 June 1394; Marienwerder, Prussia
- Venerated in: Roman Catholic Church
- Beatified: 9 July 1976, Apostolic Palace, Vatican City by Pope Paul VI
- Feast: 25 June, 30 October
- Patronage: formerly Prussia, Monastic state of the Teutonic Knights, brides, widows, parents of large families

Dorothea of Montau (6 February 1347 – 25 June 1394) was an anchoress and visionary of 14th century Prussia. After centuries of veneration in Central Europe, she was beatified in 1976.

== Life ==
Dorothea was born at Groß Montau, Prussia (now Mątowy Wielkie, Poland) west of Marienburg (now Malbork, Poland) to a wealthy farmer from Holland, Willem Swarte. She was married at the age of 17 to the swordsmith Adalbrecht of Danzig (now Gdańsk, Poland), an ill-tempered man in his 40s.

Almost immediately after marrying she began to experience visions. Her husband had little patience with her spiritual experiences and abused her. Through her humility and gentleness, she converted him and both made pilgrimages to Cologne, Aachen, and Einsiedeln Abbey in present-day Switzerland. While Dorothea, with her husband's permission, was on pilgrimage to Rome, he died in 1389 or 1390. Of their nine children eight died, four in infancy, and four during the plague of 1383. The surviving daughter, Gertrude, joined the Benedictines.

In the summer of 1391 Dorothea moved to Marienwerder (now Kwidzyn, Poland), and on 2 May 1393, with the permission of the chapter and of the Teutonic Order, established an anchoress's cell against the wall of the cathedral. She remained there the rest of her life.

Dorothea led a very austere life. Numerous visitors sought her advice and consolation, and she had visions and revelations. Her confessor, the deacon Johannes of Marienwerder, a learned theologian, wrote down her communications and composed a Latin biography in seven books, Septililium, besides a German life in four books.

Dorothea died in Marienwerder in 1394. A devotee of the Passion of Jesus and the Eucharist, she is said to have had stigmata. According to scholar Michelle Sauer, Dorothea's life "bore surprising resemblance" to Saint Jutta of Kulmsee, another Prussian anchoress who lived during the late 13th century.

== Veneration ==
Dorothea was venerated popularly from the moment of her death as the guardian of the country of the Teutonic Knights (East Prussia) and patron saint of Prussia/Pomerania. In 1405, 257 witnesses spoke of her virtues and miracles. The formal process of canonization, however, was broken off, and not resumed until 1955; she was finally beatified by Pope Paul VI in 1976.

Dorothea's feast day is celebrated on 25 June. Her relics were lost, probably during the Protestant Reformation.

== Literature ==
Her life, seen from the viewpoint of her embittered husband, is one of the subjects of the 1977 novel The Flounder by Günter Grass.

== See also ==
- Christian monasticism
- Consecrated life
