= Adolph Ferdinand Gehlen =

German chemist (1775–1815)

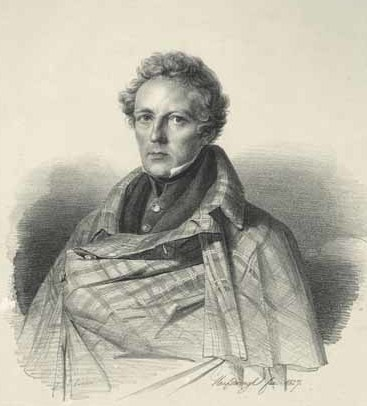
- Born: 5 September 1775; Bütow, Farther Pomerania (now Bytów, Poland)
- Died: 16 July 1815 (aged 39); Munich
- Education: University of Königsberg

Adolph Ferdinand Gehlen (5 September 1775 – 16 July 1815) was a German chemist.

== Life and education ==
Gehlen was born in Bütow, Farther Pomerania (now Bytów, Poland), he is known as the publisher of Neues allgemeines Journal der Chemie (1803–1806), Journal für Chemie und Physik (1806–10) and the Repetitorium für die Pharmacie (first series; later continued by Johann Andreas Buchner).

In 1804, he noticed that when a solution of uranium chloride in ether was exposed to sunlight, it quickly changed colour from bright yellow to green and precipitated.

He studied at the University of Königsberg and obtained his residency in 1806 from the University of Halle, where he worked as a chemist in the clinical institute of Johann Christian Reil. From 1807 to 1815, he served as an academic chemist at the Bavarian Academy of Sciences. He died from arsenic poisoning in Munich on 16 July 1815, age 39.
