= Mątowy Małe =

- Village
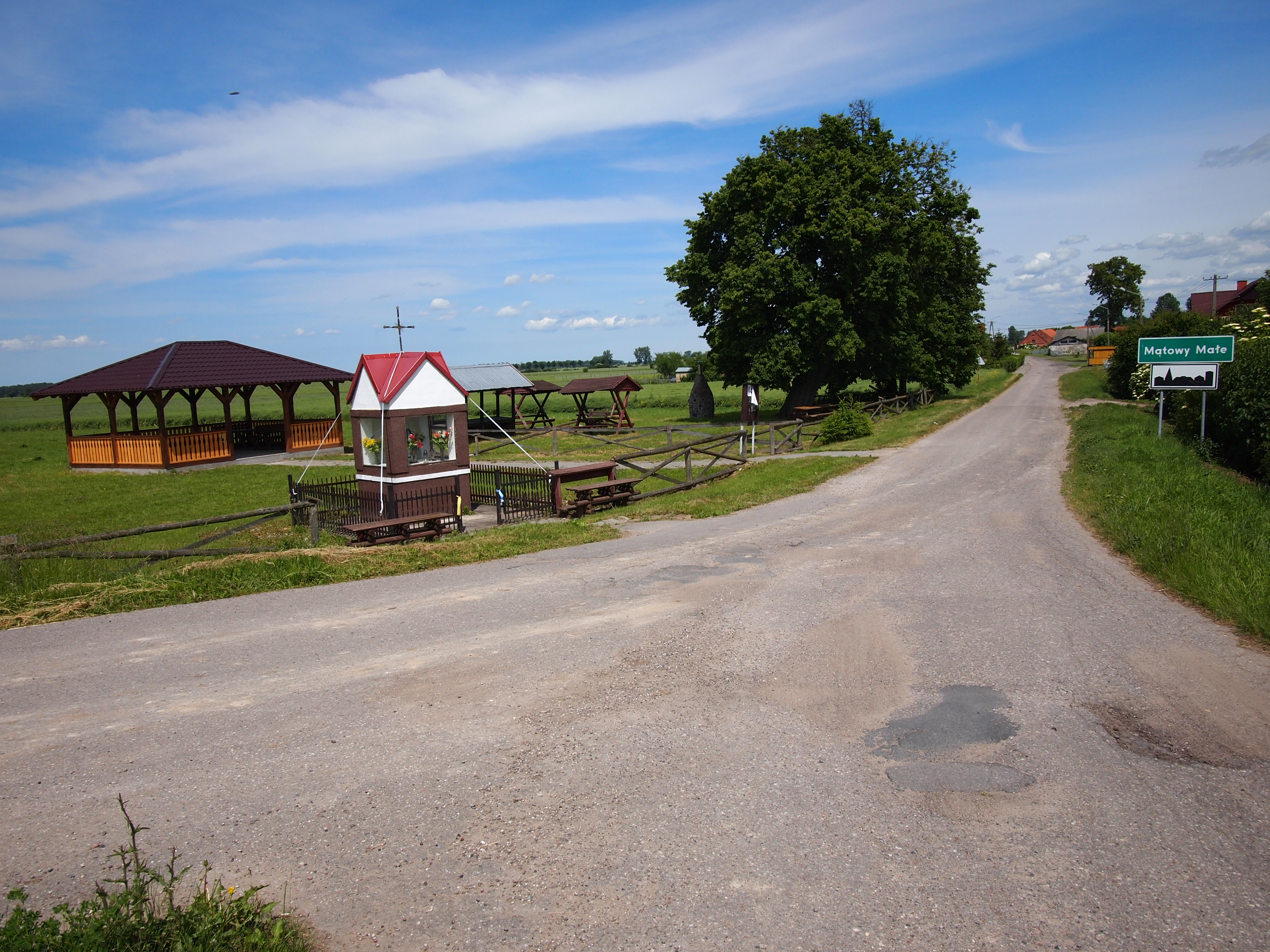

- Location within Poland
- Coordinates: 53°59′53″N 18°52′3″E
- Country: Poland
- Voivodeship: Pomeranian
- County: Malbork
- Gmina: Miłoradz
- Population: 200

Mątowy Małe [mɔnˈtɔvɨ ˈmawɛ] is a village in the administrative district of Gmina Miłoradz, within Malbork County, Pomeranian Voivodeship, in northern Poland.

For the history of the region, see History of Pomerania.
