= Świerkówko, Bytów County =

Świerkówko
- Settlement
- Location within Poland
- Coordinates: 54°11′19″N 17°25′57″E
- Country: Poland
- Voivodeship: Pomeranian
- County: Bytów
- Gmina: Bytów
- Population: 6

Świerkówko (Polish: [ɕfjɛrˈkufkɔ]; German: Jägerhaus) is a settlement in the administrative district of Gmina Bytów, within Bytów County, Pomeranian Voivodeship, in northern Poland.
