= Stara Wisła =

- Village
- Location within Poland
- Coordinates: 54°4′18″N 18°51′19″E
- Country: Poland
- Voivodeship: Pomeranian
- County: Malbork
- Gmina: Miłoradz
- Population: 190

Stara Wisła (Polish: [ˈstara ˈviswa], "Old Vistula") is a village in the administrative district of Gmina Miłoradz, within Malbork County, Pomeranian Voivodeship, in northern Poland.

For the history of the region, see History of Pomerania.
