= Chomice, Pomeranian Voivodeship =

Chomice
- Village
- Location within Poland
- Coordinates: 54°9′46″N 17°26′51″E
- Country: Poland
- Voivodeship: Pomeranian
- County: Bytów
- Gmina: Bytów
- Population: 66

Chomice ([xɔˈmit͡sɛ]; German: Rosenfelde) is a village in the administrative district of Gmina Bytów, within Bytów County, Pomeranian Voivodeship, in northern Poland.
