= Pogorzała Wieś =

- Village
- Location within Poland
- Coordinates: 53°58′29″N 18°56′0″E
- Country: Poland
- Voivodeship: Pomeranian
- County: Malbork
- Gmina: Miłoradz
- Population: 440
- Website: http://pogorzala-wies.org/

Pogorzała Wieś [pɔɡɔˈʐawa ˈvjɛɕ] is a village in the administrative district of Gmina Miłoradz, within Malbork County, Pomeranian Voivodeship, in northern Poland.

For the history of the region, see History of Pomerania.
