= Stara Kościelnica =

- Village
- Location within Poland
- Coordinates: 54°2′11″N 18°56′8″E
- Country: Poland
- Voivodeship: Pomeranian
- County: Malbork
- Gmina: Miłoradz
- Population: 250

Stara Kościelnica [ˈstara kɔɕt͡ɕɛlˈnit͡sa] is a village in the administrative district of Gmina Miłoradz, within Malbork County, Pomeranian Voivodeship, in northern Poland.

For the history of the region, see History of Pomerania.
