= Pustkowie Rekowskie =

- Village
- Location within Poland
- Coordinates: 54°04′54″N 17°24′41″E
- Country: Poland
- Voivodeship: Pomeranian
- County: Bytów
- Gmina: Bytów
- Population: 0

Pustkowie Rekowskie [pustˈkɔvjɛ rɛˈkɔfskʲɛ] (Kashubian: Pùstkòwié) is a former village in the administrative district of Gmina Bytów, within Bytów County, Pomeranian Voivodeship, in northern Poland.
