= Sarniak, Pomeranian Voivodeship =

Sarniak
- Settlement
- Location within Poland
- Coordinates: 54°15′17″N 17°28′54″E
- Country: Poland
- Voivodeship: Pomeranian
- County: Bytów
- Gmina: Bytów
- Population: 25

Sarniak ([ˈsarɲak]; German: Taubenberg) is a settlement in the administrative district of Gmina Bytów, within Bytów County, Pomeranian Voivodeship, in northern Poland.
