= Zbysław, Pomeranian Voivodeship =

Zbysław
- Village
- Location within Poland
- Coordinates: 54°14′31″N 17°28′58″E
- Country: Poland
- Voivodeship: Pomeranian
- County: Bytów
- Gmina: Bytów
- Population: 61

Zbysław ([ˈzbɨswaf]; German: Charlottenhof) is a village in the administrative district of Gmina Bytów, within Bytów County, Pomeranian Voivodeship, in northern Poland.
