= Słupia =

River in Poland

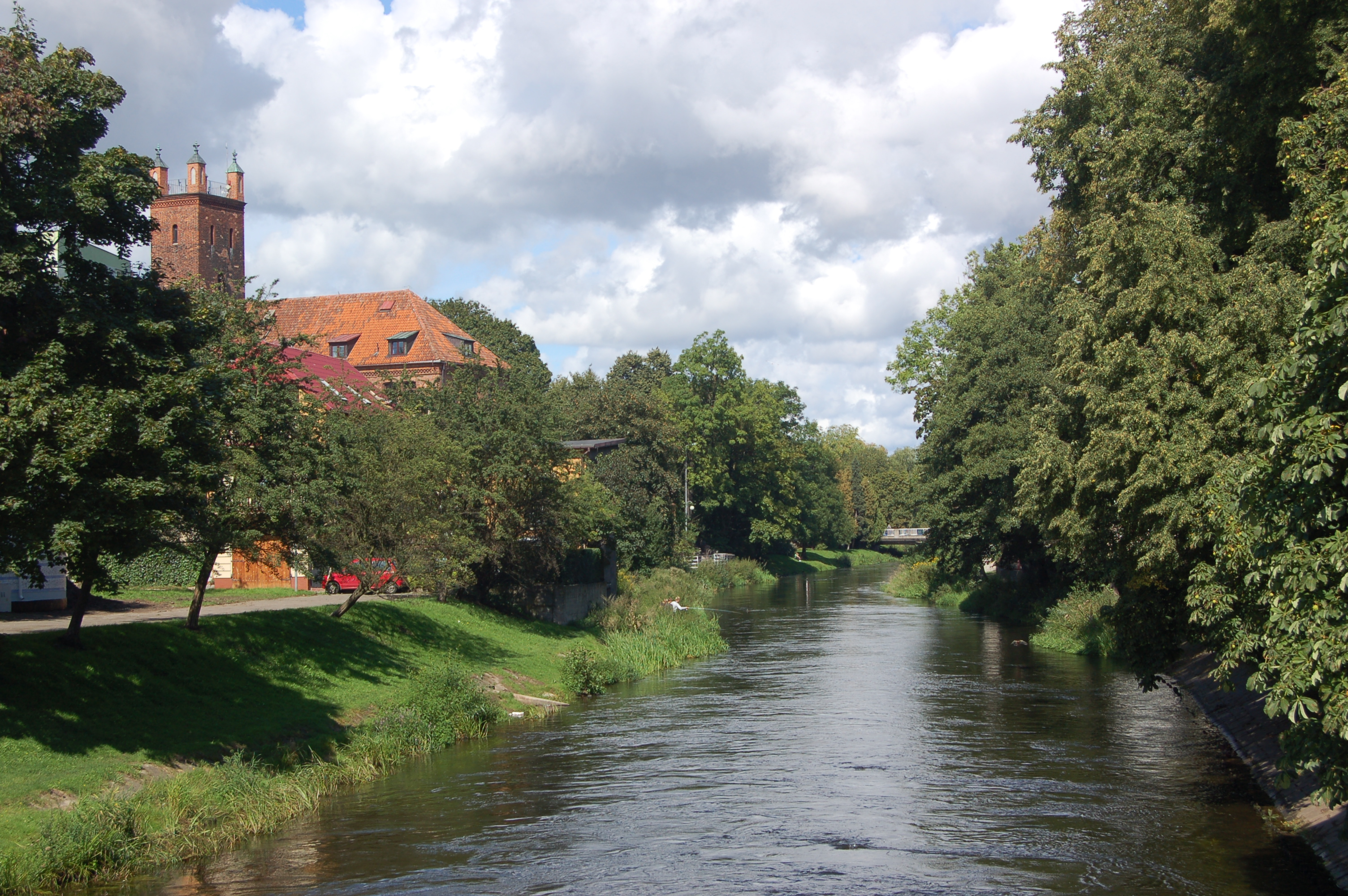
- Słupia in Słupsk

Location
- Country: Poland

Physical characteristics
- Mouth
  - location: Baltic Sea
  - coordinates: 54.5889°N 16.8528°E

Słupia (German: Stolpe) is a river in north-western Poland, a tributary of the Baltic Sea, with a length of 138 kilometres and a basin area of 1,623 km².

Cities:

- Słupsk

Towns:

- Ustka

Affluents:

- Bytowa

See also: Rivers of Poland, List of rivers of Europe.
