= Dąbki, Bytów County =

Dąbki
- Settlement
- Location within Poland
- Coordinates: 54°11′29″N 17°28′18″E
- Country: Poland
- Voivodeship: Pomeranian
- County: Bytów
- Gmina: Bytów
- Population: 27

Dąbki ([ˈdɔmpki]; German: Dampen Mühle) is a settlement in the administrative district of Gmina Bytów, within Bytów County, Pomeranian Voivodeship, in northern Poland.
