= Rękowo =

- Settlement
- Location within Poland
- Coordinates: 54°2′5″N 18°50′44″E
- Country: Poland
- Voivodeship: Pomeranian
- County: Malbork
- Gmina: Miłoradz

Rękowo [rɛnˈkɔvɔ] is a settlement in the administrative district of Gmina Miłoradz, within Malbork County, Pomeranian Voivodeship, in northern Poland.

For the history of the region, see History of Pomerania.
