= Rekowo, Bytów County =

Rekowo
- Village
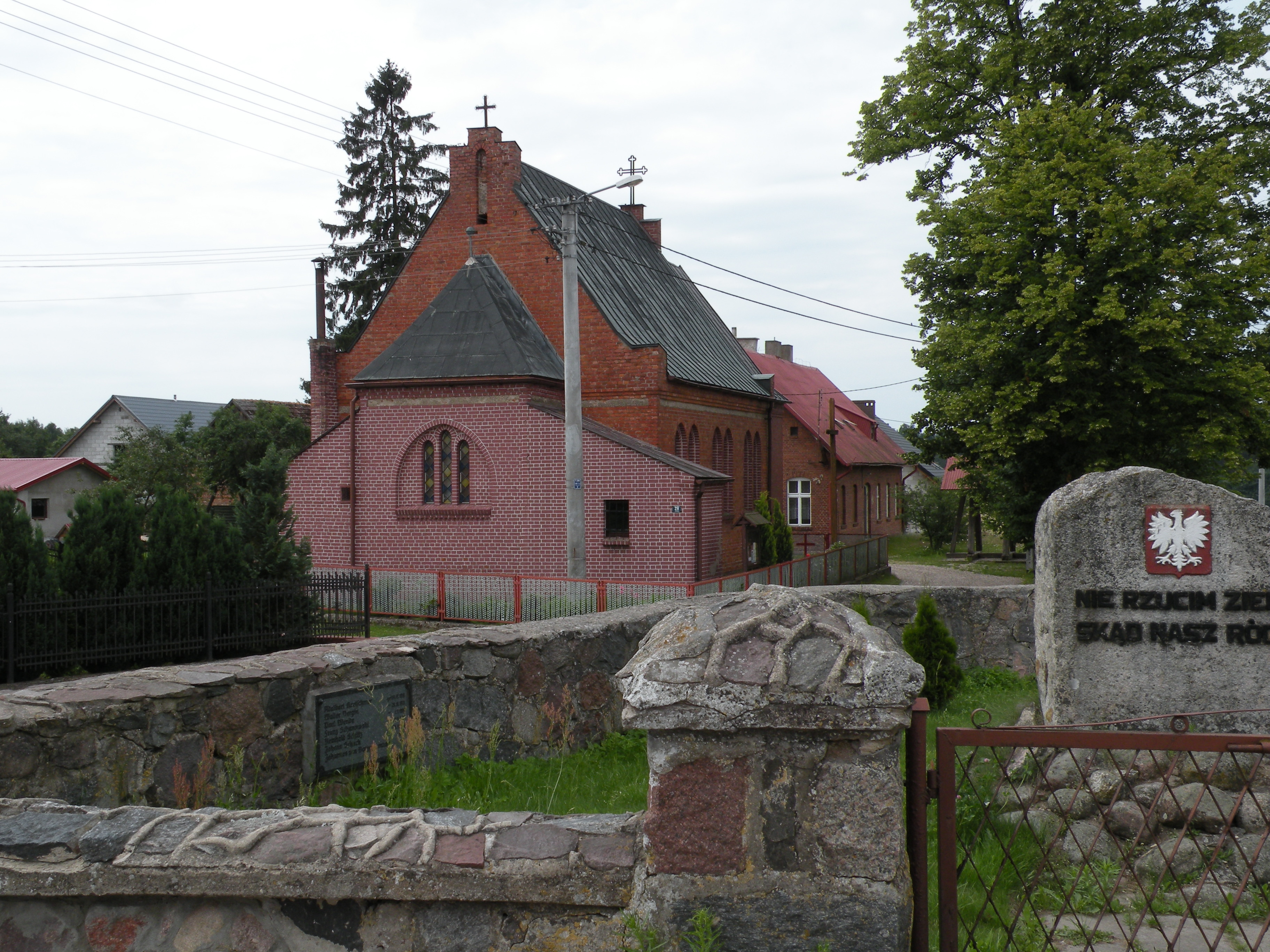
- Saint Anthony church and monument

- Location within Poland
- Coordinates: 54°5′1″N 17°26′26″E
- Country: Poland
- Voivodeship: Pomeranian
- County: Bytów
- Gmina: Bytów

Population
  - Total: 380
- Time zone: UTC+1 (CET)
  - Summer (DST): UTC+2 (CEST)
- Vehicle registration: GBY

Rekowo [rɛˈkɔvɔ] (German: Reckow) is a village in the administrative district of Gmina Bytów, within Bytów County, Pomeranian Voivodeship, in northern Poland.

== Etymology ==
The name of the village comes either from the word reki (Kashubian for crayfish) or from the male name Rak. It was mentioned as Rekow in 1437, Rakowo in 1598 and Rekowo in 1686.

== History ==
The village dates back to the 14th century. Until the early 17th century, it was a possession of local Kashubian nobility. In 1615, Francis, Duke of Pomerania, granted the Styp, Wrycza, Wantoch, and Mrożek families 30 lans of land and allowed free fishing in exchange for services in construction, military service, and the payment of certain taxes. In 1873, a Catholic school was established. In the interwar period, the village was a regional center of Polish political activism. To commemorate the local struggle to preserve Polish identity against Prussian-enforced Germanisation, a memorial was erected with the inscription Nie rzucim ziemi, skąd nasz ród ("We won't forsake the land we came from").
