= Pomysk Mały =

- Village
- Location within Poland
- Coordinates: 54°12′58″N 17°33′40″E
- Country: Poland
- Voivodeship: Pomeranian
- County: Bytów
- Gmina: Bytów
- Population: 280

Pomysk Mały ([ˈpɔmɨsk ˈmawɨ]; German: Klein Pomeiske) is a village in the administrative district of Gmina Bytów, within Bytów County, Pomeranian Voivodeship, in northern Poland.
