= Pomysk Wielki =

- Village
- Location within Poland
- Coordinates: 54°12′25″N 17°33′29″E
- Country: Poland
- Voivodeship: Pomeranian
- County: Bytów
- Gmina: Bytów
- Population: 635

Pomysk Wielki (Polish pronunciation: [ˈpɔmɨsk ˈfjɛlkʲi]) (German: Groß Pomeiske) is a village in the administrative district of Gmina Bytów, within Bytów County, Pomeranian Voivodeship, in northern Poland.
