= Budy =

Budy may refer to:

- a village near Brzeszcze, Oświęcim County in Lesser Poland Voivodeship, or the eponymous subcamp of Auschwitz concentration camp formerly located there
- Budy, Gmina Bobrowo in Kuyavian-Pomeranian Voivodeship (north-central Poland)
- Budy, Grudziądz County in Kuyavian-Pomeranian Voivodeship (north-central Poland)
- Budy, Mogilno County in Kuyavian-Pomeranian Voivodeship (north-central Poland)
- Budy, Białystok County in Podlaskie Voivodeship (north-east Poland)
- Budy, Grajewo County in Podlaskie Voivodeship (north-east Poland)
- Budy, Mońki County in Podlaskie Voivodeship (north-east Poland)
- Budy, Łódź Voivodeship (central Poland)
- Budy, Końskie County in Świętokrzyskie Voivodeship (south-central Poland)
- Budy, Staszów County in Świętokrzyskie Voivodeship (south-central Poland)
- Budy, Kozienice County in Masovian Voivodeship (east-central Poland)
- Budy, Płock County in Masovian Voivodeship (east-central Poland)
- Budy, Siedlce County in Masovian Voivodeship (east-central Poland)
- Budy, Konin County in Greater Poland Voivodeship (west-central Poland)
- Budy, Krotoszyn County in Greater Poland Voivodeship (west-central Poland)
- Budy, Złotów County in Greater Poland Voivodeship (west-central Poland)
- Budy, Bytów County in Pomeranian Voivodeship (north Poland)
- Budy, Słupsk County in Pomeranian Voivodeship (north Poland)
- Budy, Starogard County in Pomeranian Voivodeship (north Poland)
- Budy, Warmian-Masurian Voivodeship (north Poland)
- Budy, Russia, a village in the Republic of Mordovia, Russia
- Budy, Ukraine, an urban-type settlement in Kharkiv Oblast, Ukraine
  - Avangard Budy, a bandy club based in Budy, Ukraine
