= Zarośle =

Zarośle may refer to the following places:

- Zarośle, Gmina Bobrowo in Kuyavian-Pomeranian Voivodeship (north-central Poland)
- Zarośle, Gmina Zbiczno in Kuyavian-Pomeranian Voivodeship (north-central Poland)
- Zarośle, Grudziądz County in Kuyavian-Pomeranian Voivodeship (north-central Poland)
- Zarośle, Pomeranian Voivodeship (north Poland)
