= Czekanowo =

Czekanowo may refer to:

- Czekanowo, Kuyavian-Pomeranian Voivodeship, village in North-central Poland.
- Czekanowo, Greater Poland Voivodeship, village in West-central Poland.

== See also ==
- Czekanów (disambiguation)
- Chekanovo
