= Florencja =

Florencja is the Polish name for the city of Florence, Italy. It may also refer to the following places in Poland:

- Florencja, Kuyavian-Pomeranian Voivodeship
- Florencja, Radom County, Masovian Voivodeship
- Florencja, Sierpc County, Masovian Voivodeship.
