= Henryk Zieliński =

Polish historian

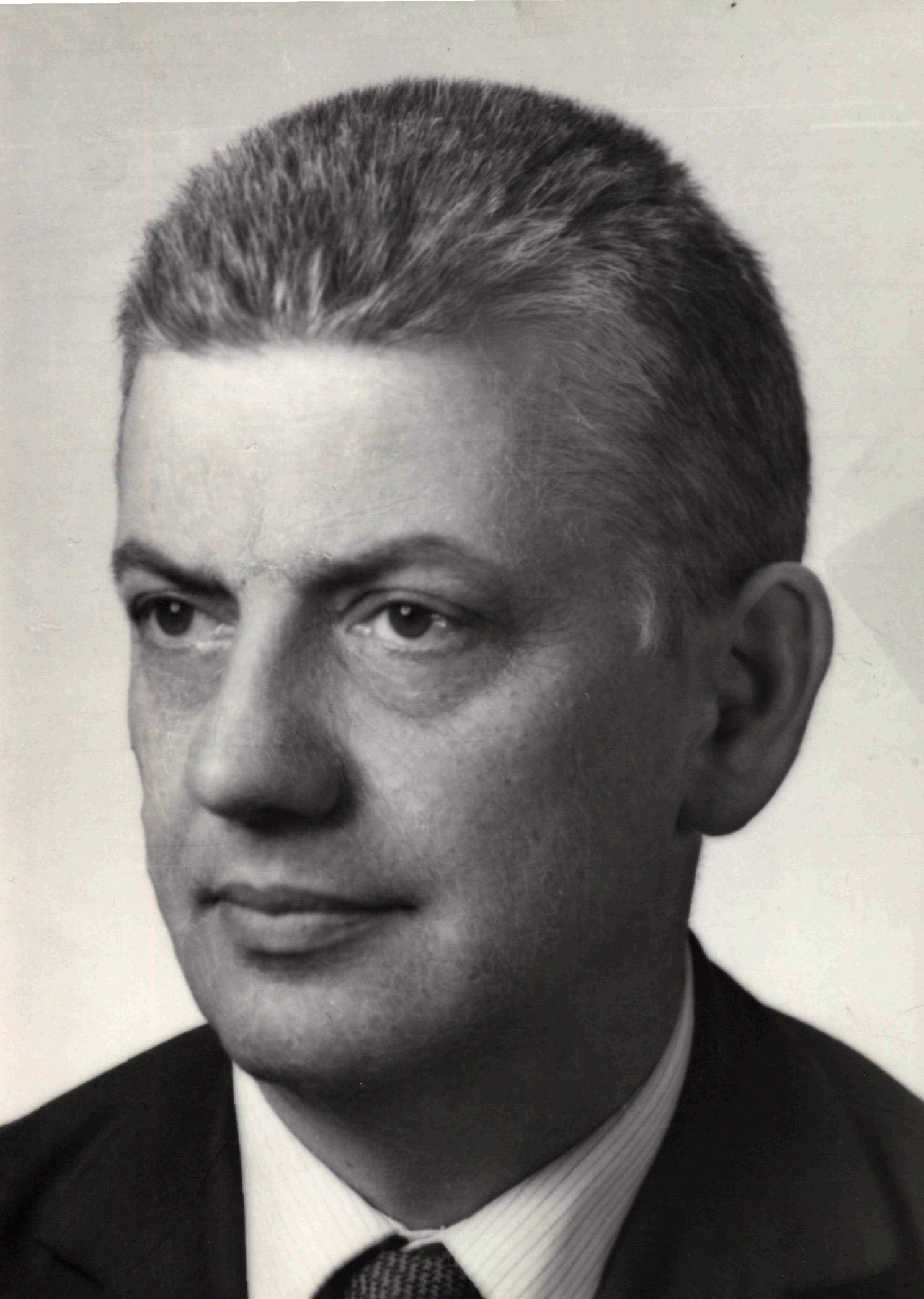
Zieliński in 1970

Henryk Zieliński (22 September 1920 in Szembruczek near Grudziądz - 6 March 1981 in Wrocław) was a Polish historian and professor at the University of Wrocław.

== Biography ==
After his high-school exit exam ("maturity diploma") he was conscripted, in summer 1938, to the Polish military service as cadet; next year, after the Invasion of Poland he was wounded during the Battle of Bzura. Soon he was imprisoned in a German POW camp, from which he tried to escape three times, finally succeeding in 1944. He moved to Kraków, where he became one of the students of the underground university.

After the war, in the People's Republic of Poland, although at first he opposed the Polish communist government, in 1949 he joined the Polish United Workers' Party and was allowed to become a staff member of the University of Wrocław. Years later, a few days before his mysterious death, he told the listeners – group of his apprentices and co-workers in the University – that in 1949 he 'allowed himself to be manipulated'. Around 1951/1952 he defended his PhD thesis. In 1955 he became a docent, and in 1962 he became professor. However from the 1960s he became increasingly critical of the government. In the aftermath of the Polish 1968 political crisis, the Prague Spring and the Polish 1970 protests, where he openly supported the opposition, he was persecuted by the Polish secret police, Służba Bezpieczeństwa, and in the period of 1970-1972 he was forced to retire from Wrocław University, and briefly worked at the new University of Silesia. In 1972 he returned to Wrocław, as the environment there became more open again, while the Silesian University became a party stronghold, with Zieliński's research criticized for not being "proletarian" enough, and his refusal to bow down to the nomenklatura and accept the children of party officials as his students, irrespective of merit. He supported the Solidarity movement created in 1980.

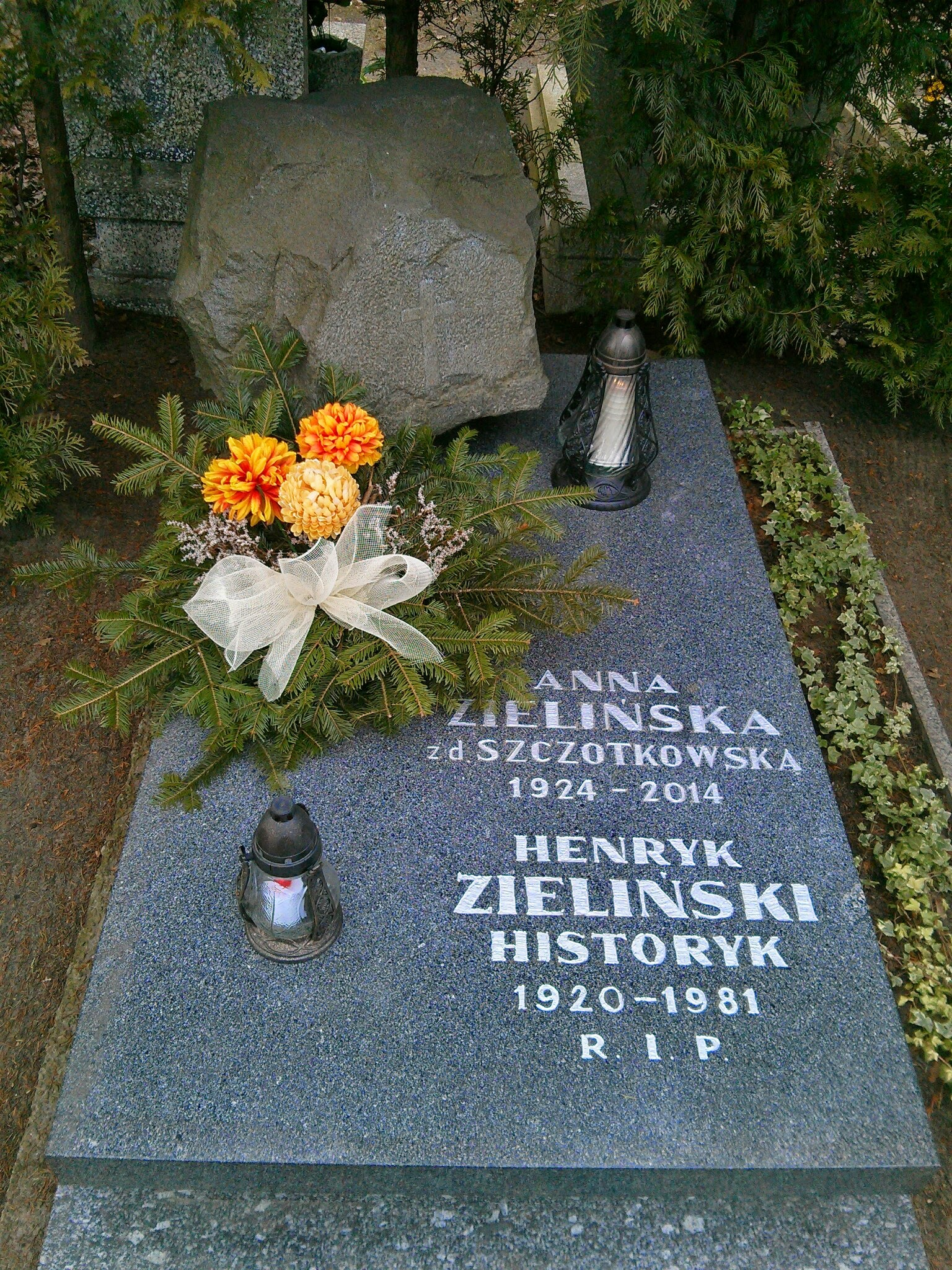
Grave of Henryk Zieliński. Wrocław cemetery at Grabiszyn-Grabiszynek (sect. 2A)

His death in the early morning hours of 6 March 1981 was suspicious: he was found dead on a sidewalk near his house. Although at first both the press and milicja investigators talked about a murder, from the next day the official line was that it was an accident and the investigation was annulled.

== Works ==
Henryk Zieliński was interested in the history of Polish-German relations, especially the history of germanization. He was the author of many publications related to Silesia and its history, such as the Silesian Uprisings and the Wielkopolska Uprising after the First World War. Near the end of his life he also became interested in the development of Polish political thought in the 19th and 20th centuries.

In the 1970s, with the improving relations between Poles and Germans, he took part in the work of the Polish-German Textbook Commission, a joint Polish-German governmental organization which reviewed the current textbooks in both countries in order to remove anti-German and anti-Polish stereotypes and former propaganda.

His last major work, Historia Polski 1914 – 1939 (History of Poland 1914-1939), was printed posthumously. Due to the government crackdown on opposition the book was heavily censored, but the underground errata was soon realised in the form of bibuła (Russian samizdat). The censorship of his books is a good example of the problem faced by historians under regimes which interfere with academic work. Specifically, the Polish communist censorship completely removed any mention of the Molotov–Ribbentrop Pact (Nazi Germany-Soviet alliance) and the section on the Soviet invasion of Poland on 17 September 1939 together with the photo of the German–Soviet military parade in Brest-Litovsk was removed and replaced with a general note on changed borders.

Among his former students are three notable contemporary Polish historians: Marian Orzechowski, Adolf Juzwenko and Włodzimierz Suleja.

Zieliński received the Knight's Cross of Polonia Restituta and the Medal of the National Education Commission.

== Selected bibliography ==
- "Liczba Polaków w Niemczech w latach 1918-1939 na tle systemu niemieckiej statystyki narodowościowej" (Number of Poles in Germany from 1918-1939 in the context of the German system of nationality statistics); in: "Przegląd Zachodni" z.9, (1948)
- "Polacy i polskość Ziemi Złotowskiej w latach 1918-1939" (Poles and Polish culture of Ziemia Złotowskia in 1918-1939) (1949)
- "Zagadnienie powstań śląskich" (The issue of Silesian Uprisings); in: "Wiadomości Historyczne" nr 5 (1952) i nr 1 (1953)
- "Położenie i walka górnośląskiego proletariatu w latach 1918–1922" (The situation and fights of the proletariat in the Upper Silesia from 1918-1922) (1957)
- Znaczenie traktatu wersalskiego dla rozwoju stosunków polsko-niemieckich"; in: "Kwartalnik Historyczny" nr 1 (The importantce of the Treaty of Versailles to the development of Polish-German relations), (1963)
- "Polska myśl polityczna a sprawa ziem zachodnich (przed rokiem 1914)" (Polish political thought and the issue of western lands (before the year 1914)); in: "Sobótka" nr 1-2 (1964)
- "Historia Polski 1864–1939" (History of Poland, 1864-1939) (1968)
- "Rola powstania wielkopolskiego oraz powstań śląskich w walce o zjednoczenie ziem zachodnich i niepodległą Polskę (1918-1921)" (The role of the Wielkopolska Uprising and Silesian Uprisings in the fight to unite the western lands and independent Poland (1918-1922)); in: Droga przez półwiecze. O Polsce lat 1918-1968. Referaty z sesji PAN i UW poświęcone 50 rocznicy odzyskania niepodległości, (1969)
- "Batalii podręcznikowej ciąg dalszy (Historia Polski w zachodnioniemieckich podręcznikach szkolnych)" (The textbook warfare continued: History of Poland in the West Germany school textbooks); in: "Odra", nr 10, (1973)
- "O potrzebie i trudnościach badania polskiej myśli politycznej" (On the needs and problems in studying the Polish political thought); in: "Polska Myśl polityczna XIX i XX w.", t.I: "Polska i jej sąsiedzi", Wrocław (1975)
- "Polska Myśl polityczna XIX i XX w." (Polish political thought in the 19th and 20th c.), t.I: "Polska i jej sąsiedzi", Wrocław (1975), (ed.)
- "Czy istniał model polskiego działacza politycznego (Piłsudski, Witos, Paderewski, Dmowski)" (Was there a model of a Polish political activist?); in: Dzieje kultury politycznej w Polsce pod red. J.A.Gierowskiego, (1977)
- "Polska myśl polityczna XIX i XX wieku" (Polish political thought in the 19th and 20th c.), t.II: "Twórcy polskiej myśli politycznej", Wrocław (1978), (introduction, ed.)
- "Historia Polski 1914–1939" (History of Poland 1914-1939) (1983, second edition 1985)

== Sources ==
- Encyklopedia Powszechna PWN (Great Polish Encyclopedy) (in Polish):
  - vol. IV (1976), [without ISBN], p. 786
  - vol. V – Suplement (1988), ISBN 83-01-08614-9, p. 564
- "Studia Historyczne" – "Historia XXXVI", Acta Universitatis Wratislaviensis No 543, University of Wrocław Editorial 1981: Przedmowa & Bibliografia prac prof. dra Henryka Zielińskiego (author – Krzysztof Kawalec) (in Polish)
- Włodzimierz Suleja, Mistrz, Dziennik Dolnośląski nr 47, 7.03.1991, p. 6 (in Polish)
- Encyklopedia Wrocławia (Encyclopedy of Wrocław), Wydawnictwo Dolnośląskie (Lower Silesia Ed. (2000), ISBN 83-7023-749-5, p. 954 ←(wrong death date) (in Polish)
- Wanda Dybalska, Tylko bokser był świadkiem, in: Taki zwyczajny, ed. Atut, Wrocław 2005, ISBN 83-7432-012-5, pp. 115–127 (in Polish)
- Krzysztof Kawalec, Zieliński Henryk [1920-1981] – jak go pamiętam – memory of prof. Zieliński in "Gazeta Wyborcza", 7.3.2006 (in Polish)
- Teresa Suleja, Henryk Zieliński, [in:] Wrocławskie środowisko akademickie. Twórcy i ich uczniowie 1945-2005, Wrocław-Warszawa-Kraków 2007, ISBN 978-83-04-04823-2, p. 277 (in Polish)
- Juliusz Zieliński, Wspomnienie o Ojcu – Profesorze Henryku Zielińskim, [in:] Łambinowicki Rocznik Muzealny. Jeńcy wojenni w latach II wojny światowej, nr 33/2010, ed. Centralne Muzeum Jeńców Wojennych w Łambinowicach-Opolu, Opole 2010, ISSN 0137-5199, pp. 153–164 (in Polish)
