= Chojno =

Chojno may refer to the following places:

- Chojno, Brodnica County in Kuyavian-Pomeranian Voivodeship (north-central Poland)
- Chojno, Kalisz County in Greater Poland Voivodeship (west-central Poland)
- Chojno, Kwidzyn County in Pomeranian Voivodeship (north Poland)
- Chojno, Lipno County in Kuyavian-Pomeranian Voivodeship (north-central Poland)
- Chojno, Rawicz County in Greater Poland Voivodeship (west-central Poland)
- Chojno, Szamotuły County in Greater Poland Voivodeship (west-central Poland)
