= Smolniki =

Smolniki may refer to:

- Smolniki, Brodnica County in Kuyavian-Pomeranian Voivodeship (north-central Poland)
- Smolniki, Nakło County in Kuyavian-Pomeranian Voivodeship (north-central Poland)
- Smolniki, Podlaskie Voivodeship (north-east Poland)
- Smolniki, Konin County in Greater Poland Voivodeship (west-central Poland)
- Smolniki, Ostrzeszów County in Greater Poland Voivodeship (west-central Poland)
- Smolniki, Lubusz Voivodeship (west Poland)
- Smolniki, Pomeranian Voivodeship (north Poland)
- Smolniki, Kartuzy County in Pomeranian Voivodeship (north Poland)
- Smolniki, Starogard County in Pomeranian Voivodeship (north Poland)
- Smolniki, Warmian-Masurian Voivodeship (north Poland)
- Smolniki, West Pomeranian Voivodeship (north-west Poland)
