= Kawki (disambiguation) =

Kawki may refer to any of the following villages in Poland:

- Kawki, Kuyavian-Pomeranian Voivodeship, in north-central Poland
- Kawki, Lubusz Voivodeship, west Poland
- Kawki, Silesian Voivodeship, south Poland
- Kawki, Warmian-Masurian Voivodeship, north Poland
- Kawki is also an historic, and incorrect alternative name for the Jaqaru language.
