= Rogóźno, Kuyavian-Pomeranian Voivodeship =

Rogóźno
- Village
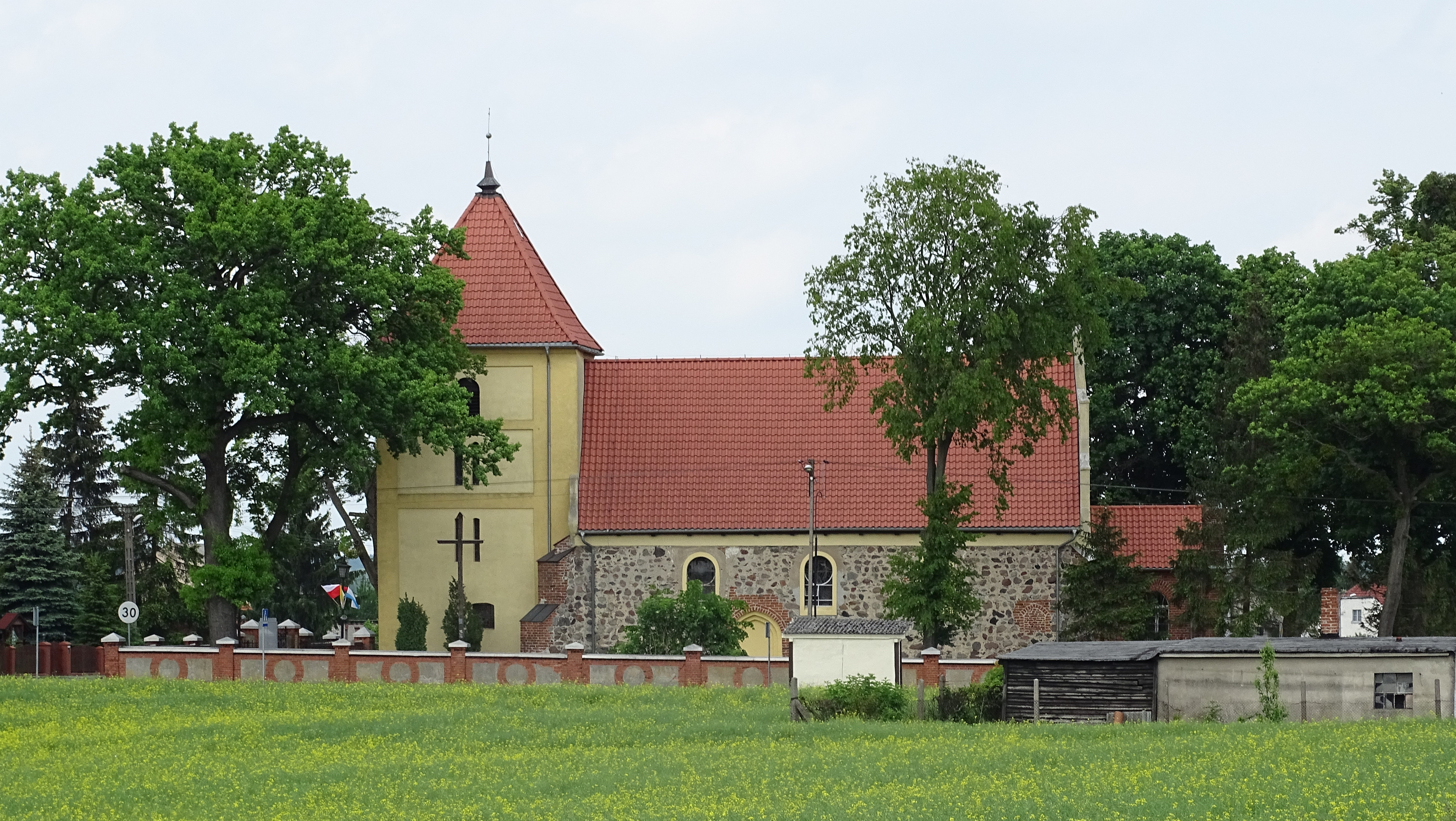
- St Adalbert's Church in Rogóźno
- Interactive map of Rogóźno
- Location within Poland
- Coordinates: 53°32′8″N 18°55′41″E
- Country: Poland
- Voivodeship: Kuyavian-Pomeranian
- County: Grudziądz
- Gmina: Rogóźno
- Population: 960
- Time zone: UTC+1 (CET)
  - Summer (DST): UTC+2 (CEST)
- Vehicle registration: CGR

Rogóźno [rɔˈɡuʑnɔ] is a village in Grudziądz County, Kuyavian-Pomeranian Voivodeship, in north-central Poland. It is the seat of the gmina (administrative district) called Gmina Rogóźno.

== History ==
In 1226 Duke Konrad I of Masovia had called for the Teutonic Order to fight against the pagan Old Prussian tribes, and granted the area to the Teutonic Knights as a fief. The Order had a castle (Ordensburg) built at Groß-Rogis —present-day Rogóźno-Zamek— about 1275. Soon after, a parish church was erected near the fortress and a settlement arose. In 1454, upon the request of the anti-Teutonic Prussian Confederation, the Chełmno Land was reincorporated into the Kingdom of Poland by King Casimir IV Jagiellon. After the subsequent Thirteen Years' War, in 1466, the region was confirmed as part of Poland. Afterwards the village was administratively located in the Chełmno Voivodeship in the province of Royal Prussia in the Greater Poland Province of the Polish Crown.

Devastated by Swedish troops in the 17th century, the parish church had to be rebuilt twice, using stones from the decayed Order's castle. Rogóźno was annexed by the Kingdom of Prussia during the First Partition of Poland in 1772. It was included within the newly formed province of West Prussia. The settlement prospered and by the 19th century was one of the largest villages in the Marienwerder region. Following World War I, in 1918, Poland regained independence, and upon the 1919 Treaty of Versailles, the area was ceded to the Second Polish Republic.

During the German occupation (World War II), Rogóźno was one of the sites of executions of Poles carried out by the Germans in 1939 as part of the Intelligenzaktion. Farmers from Rogóźno were also murdered by the German SS and Selbstschutz in the large massacre of Poles committed in 1939 in nearby Białochowo, also as part of the Intelligenzaktion. In 1940, the occupiers also carried out expulsions of Poles, whose houses were then handed over to German colonists as part of the Lebensraum policy.

== Notable residents ==
- Johannes von Kries (1853–1928), German psychologist
- Werner Dobberstein (1911–1993), German Kriegsmarine officer
