= Gmina Rogozno =

Gmina Rogozno may refer to either of the following gminas (municipalities) in Poland:

- Gmina Rogoźno, in Oborniki County in Greater Poland Voivodeship (west-central Poland)
- Gmina Rogóźno, in Grudziądz County in Kuyavian-Pomeranian Voivodeship (north-central Poland)
