= Pasieki =

Pasieki may refer to:

- Pasieki, Kuyavian-Pomeranian Voivodeship (north-central Poland)
- Pasieki, Lublin Voivodeship (east Poland)
- Pasieki, Podlaskie Voivodeship (north-east Poland)
- Pasieki, Lipsko County in Masovian Voivodeship (east-central Poland)
- Pasieki, Ostrołęka County in Masovian Voivodeship (east-central Poland)
- Pasieki, Opole Voivodeship (south-west Poland)
- Pasieki, Warmian-Masurian Voivodeship (north Poland)
