= Tylice =

Tylice may refer to the following places in Poland:

- Tylice, Lower Silesian Voivodeship (south-west Poland)
- Tylice, Brodnica County in Kuyavian-Pomeranian Voivodeship (north-central Poland)
- Tylice, Toruń County in Kuyavian-Pomeranian Voivodeship (north-central Poland)
- Tylice, Warmian-Masurian Voivodeship (north Poland)
