= Nieżywięć, Kuyavian-Pomeranian Voivodeship =

Nieżywięć
- Village
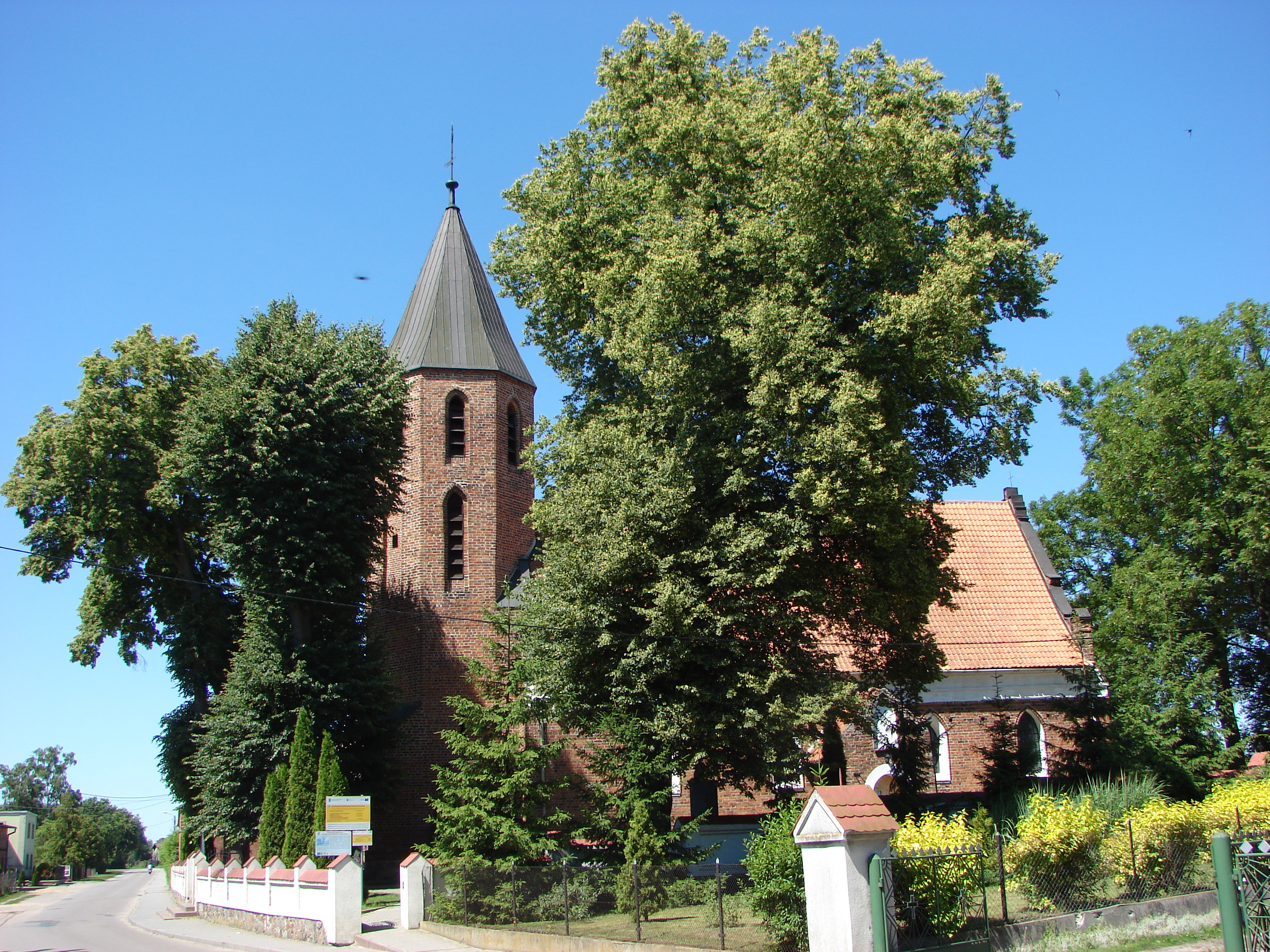
- Parish church of St John the Evangelist, built turn XIII/XIV c.

- Location within Poland
- Coordinates: 53°16′N 19°10′E
- Country: Poland
- Voivodeship: Kuyavian-Pomeranian
- County: Brodnica
- Gmina: Bobrowo
- Time zone: UTC+1 (CET)
  - Summer (DST): UTC+2 (CEST)
- Vehicle registration: CBR

Nieżywięć [ɲɛˈʐɨvjɛnt͡ɕ] is a village in the administrative district of Gmina Bobrowo, within Brodnica County, Kuyavian-Pomeranian Voivodeship, in north-central Poland. It is located in the Chełmno Land in the historic region of Pomerania.

== History ==
During the German occupation of Poland (World War II), Nieżywięć was one of the sites of executions of Poles, carried out by the Germans in 1939 as part of the Intelligenzaktion. A local teacher was among the victims of large massacres of Poles from the region, committed by the German police and Selbstschutz in October 1939 in the nearby Brzezinki forest in the county.
