= Brudzawy =

- Village
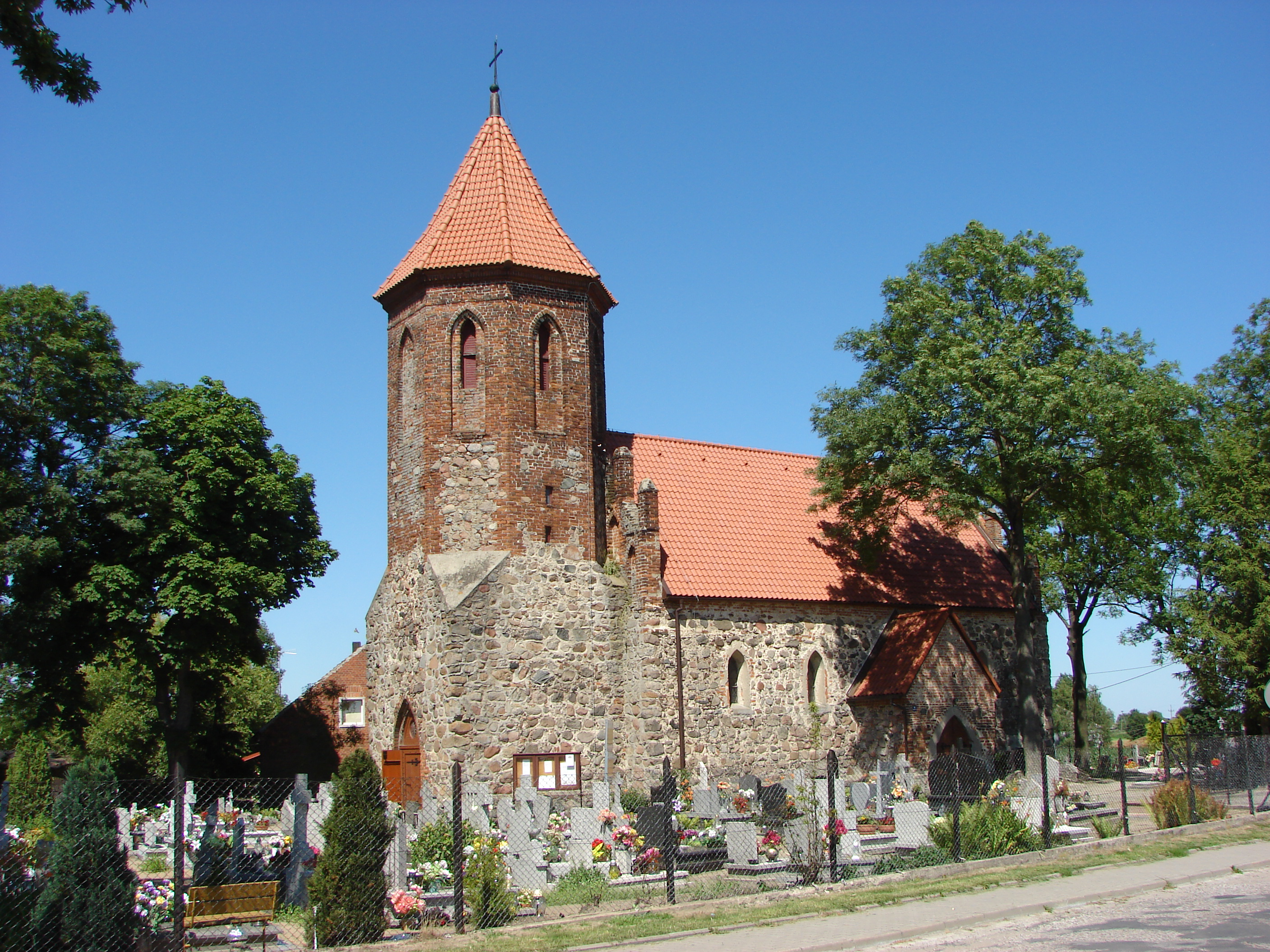
- Parish church of Saint Andrew from first half of the 14th century

- Location within Poland
- Coordinates: 53°19′N 19°9′E
- Country: Poland
- Voivodeship: Kuyavian-Pomeranian
- County: Brodnica
- Gmina: Bobrowo

Brudzawy [bruˈd͡zavɨ] is a village in the administrative district of Gmina Bobrowo, within Brodnica County, Kuyavian-Pomeranian Voivodeship, in north-central Poland.
