= Jan Zumbach =

World War II pilot and ace of the Polish Air Force

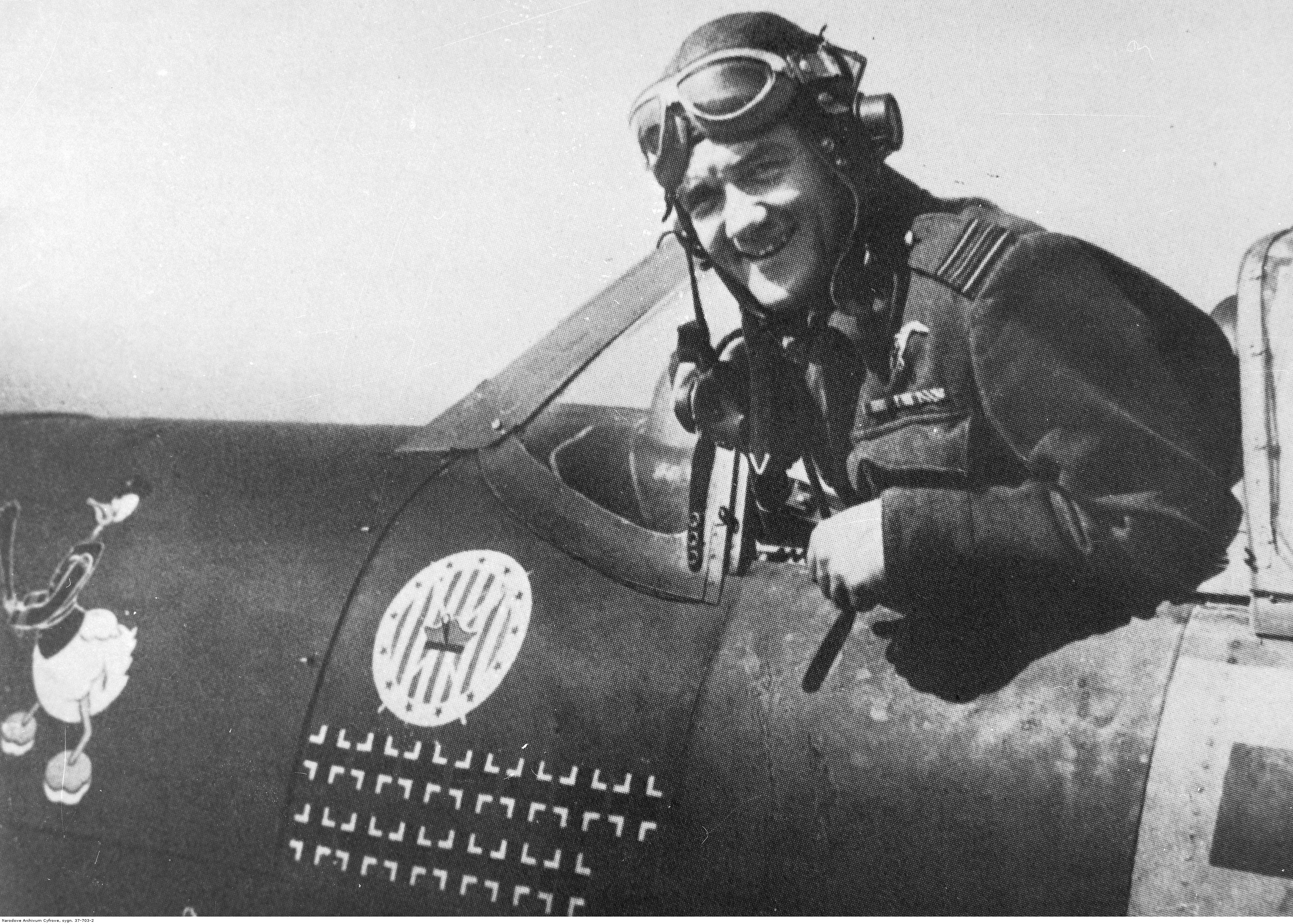
- Jan Zumbach, c. October 1940
- Born: 14 April 1915; Stary Służew, Congress Poland, Russian Empire
- Died: 3 January 1986 (aged 70); France
- Military career
- Allegiance: Poland; France; United Kingdom; Katanga; Biafra
- Branch: Polish Air Force; French Air Force; Royal Air Force; Katangese Air Force; Biafran Air Force
- Service years: 1934–1967
- Rank: Wing Commander
- Service number: 1382
- Commands: 303 Squadron (1942–1943)
- Conflicts: World War II; Western Front; Battle of France; Battle of Britain; Congo Crisis; Nigerian Civil War
- Awards: Virtuti Militari; Polish Cross of Valour (4 awards); Distinguished Flying Cross & Bar

Jan Eugeniusz Ludwik Zumbach (14 April 1915 – 3 January 1986) was a Polish-Swiss fighter pilot who became an ace and squadron commander during the Second World War. During the Cold War, he became a mercenary in Africa and played a key role in forming the air forces of the breakaway states of Katanga and Biafra.

== Early years ==
The son of Eugeniusz Zumbach and Halina (née Gorzechowska), landowners hailing from Płock. Zumbach was registered as a Swiss citizen (his paternal grandfather of Swiss origin settled in Poland at the end of the 19th century). He was born in Ursynów, and grew up in Bobrowo. In 1935, he graduated the Marshal Stanisław Małachowski High School in Płock. He joined the Polish Army in 1935 and served as an infantryman until 1936 when he transferred to the Polish Air Force. After graduating the Polish Air Force Officer Training Center No. 1 in Dęblin in 1938 he was posted to 111 Eskadra Myśliwska.

== Second World War ==
Zumbach did not fly during the German invasion of Poland due to a broken leg from a flying accident during the summer of 1939. He returned to his unit only to be evacuated to France via Romania. While in France, Zumbach flew the Morane 406 and Curtiss Hawk 75 with GCII/55. On 10 June, he was one of several pilots shot down by Bf 109s, but escaped unscathed. On 18 June 1940, he travelled to England by boat and on 2 August was posted as one of the founding members of the newly formed No. 303 Polish Fighter Squadron.

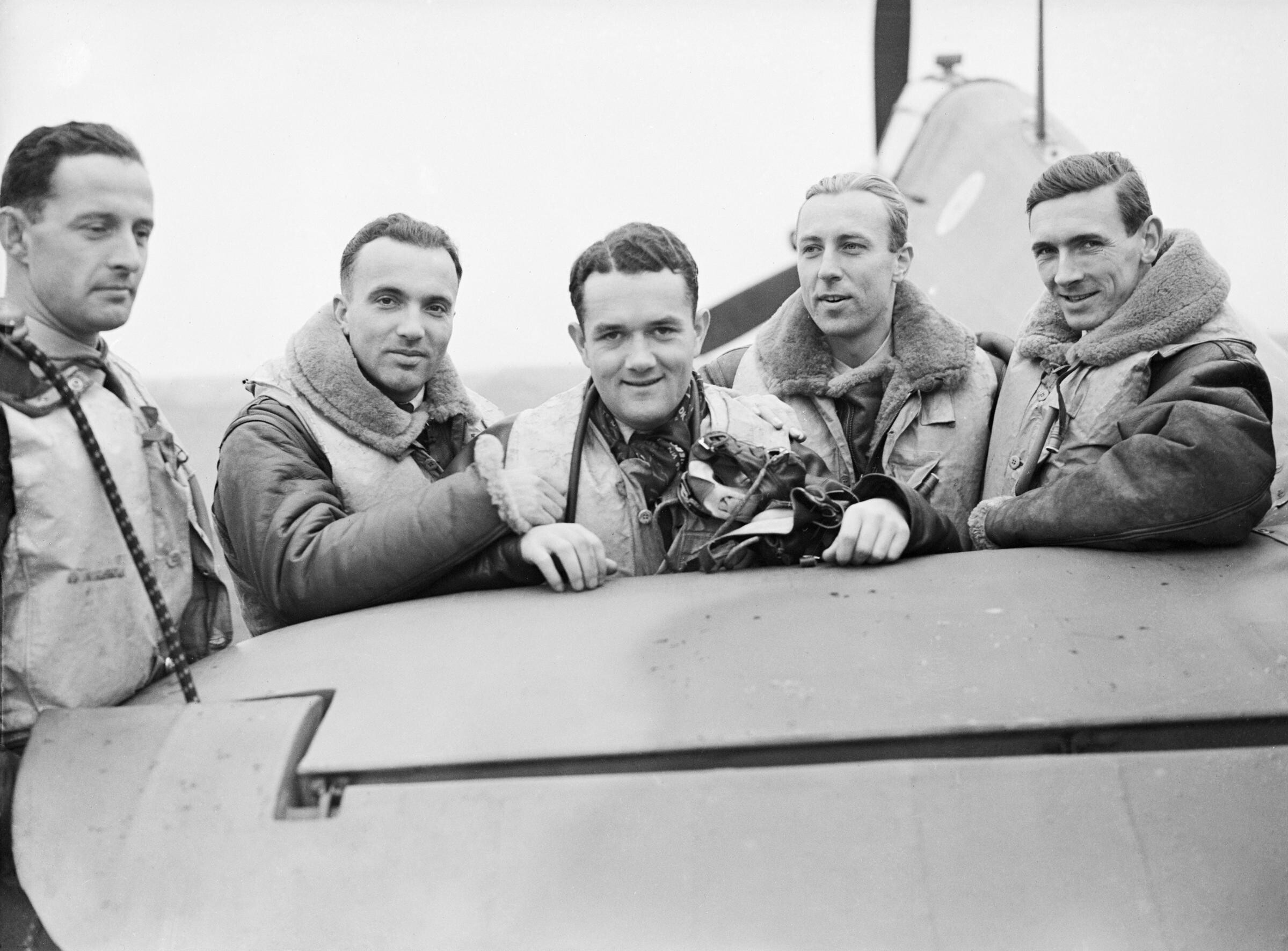
Jan Zumbach (center) with four 303 Squadron comrades beside one of their Hurricane Mark I's

During the Battle of Britain, Zumbach scored eight victories and one probable, mostly against Messerschmitt Bf 109 fighters. Zumbach was shot down by a JG 3 Bf 109 over Dover on 9 May 1941 when returning from a mission, but he was again able to bail out unharmed.

Zumbach became one of the first Allied pilots to engage in combat with a German Focke-Wulf Fw 190, which he damaged; in return, his aircraft was damaged by a "single radial-engined fighter" on 13 October 1941. In December 1941, Zumbach was posted to 58 OTU, and in March 1942 returned to 303 Squadron as a flight commander. In May, he was promoted to squadron leader and took command of the squadron, a post Zumbach held from 19 May 1942 until 30 November 1943.

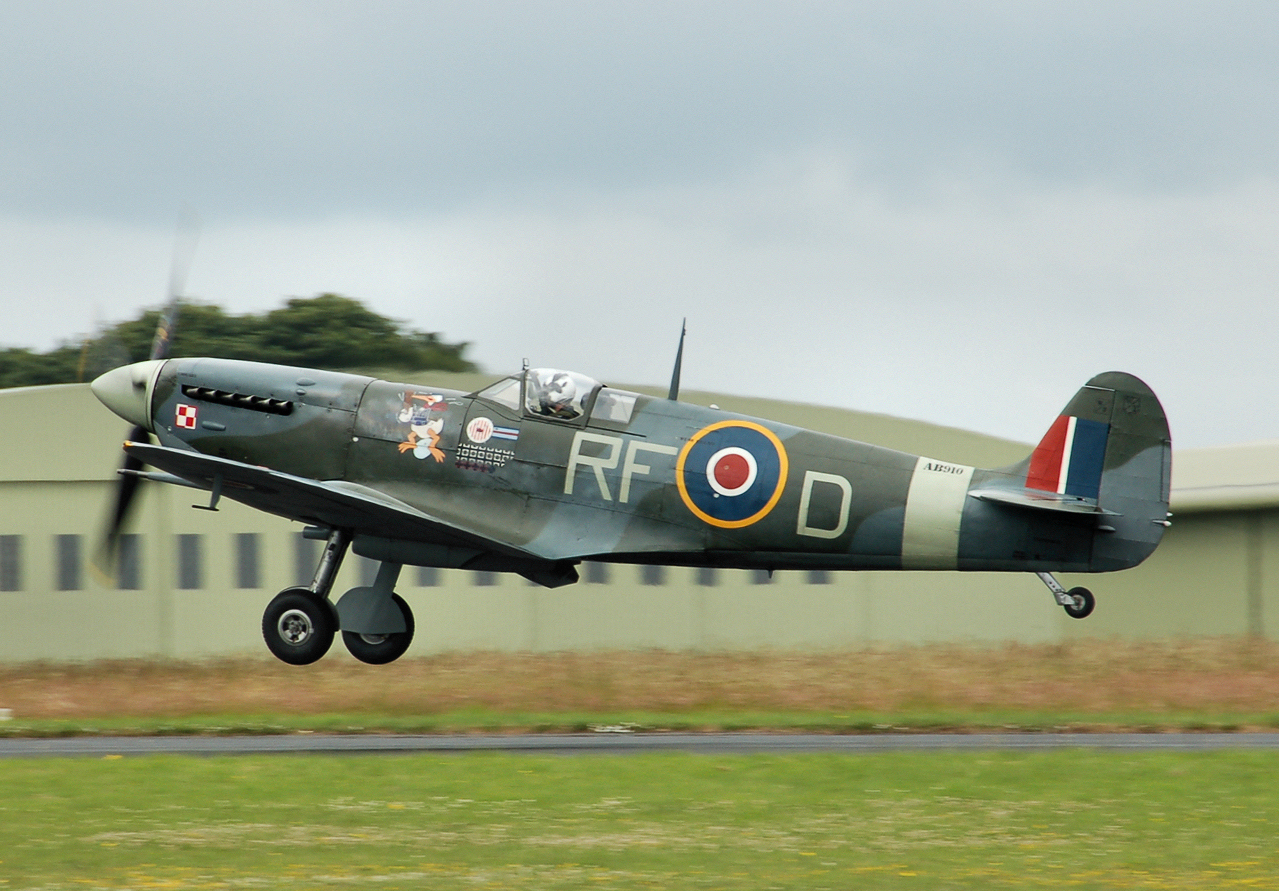
A Battle of Britain Memorial Flight Spitfire with Zumbach's markings

During this period, Zumbach flew three Supermarine Spitfire VBs, serial numbers BM144, EP594 and EN951. All these aircraft carried the same code, RF-D, "RF" being the squadron code for 303 Squadron and "D" the individual aircraft code. All three aircraft carried a cartoon of Donald Duck on the port side of the fuselage, slightly forward of the cockpit. Zumbach's victory tally was marked with German crosses under the cockpit on the port side; confirmed kills were outlined in white, probable kills in red, and damaged aircraft with no outline.

After handing over command of 303 Squadron to Squadron Leader Bieńkowski, Zumbach spent a year in staff appointments, including the Polish Air Force Staff College. He returned to flying duties as the commander of the 2nd Polish Air Wing, No 133 Wing. On 25 September 1944, he scored his final victory of the war, a probable kill over a JG 26 Fw 190 over Arnhem.

On 30 January 1945, Zumbach was posted to HQ, No. 84 Group. While flying an Auster that was used to visit units under the Group's command, he made a navigational error and ran out of fuel. He force-landed in enemy territory and spent the final month of the war as a prisoner of war.

Zumbach's final victory tally was 12 (and two shared) confirmed kills, five probables and one damaged.

== Post-Second World War ==
Roundel of the Biafran Air Force, organised and commanded by Jan Zumbach under the alias "John Brown".

Zumbach was demobilised in October 1946 but continued to fly for a living. Under a Swiss passport, he flew contraband around Southern Europe and the Middle East.

He opened a night club in Paris called the Club de l'Étoile.

In January 1962, Zumbach was contracted to organise and command Avikat, the air force of Congolese breakaway state of Katanga, commanding it until December 1962. He went on to deal in second-hand aircraft before again becoming a mercenary in 1967, as he organised and commanded the air force of Biafra, flying the B-26 Invader, using the nom de guerre of John Brown. Based in Enugu, he became well known among the locals. During that time, he also partook in Biafran air force raids, including killing a Nigerian army chief of staff during an attack on Markudi airfield he led.

In 1975, Zumbach published his autobiography, originally available in French under the title Mister Brown: Aventures dans le ciel, it was subsequently published in German, English under the title On Wings of War: My Life as a Pilot Adventurer, and Polish under the title Ostatnia walka: Moje życie jako lotnika, przemytnika i poszukiwacza przygód. (The final battle: My life as a pilot, smuggler, and adventurer).

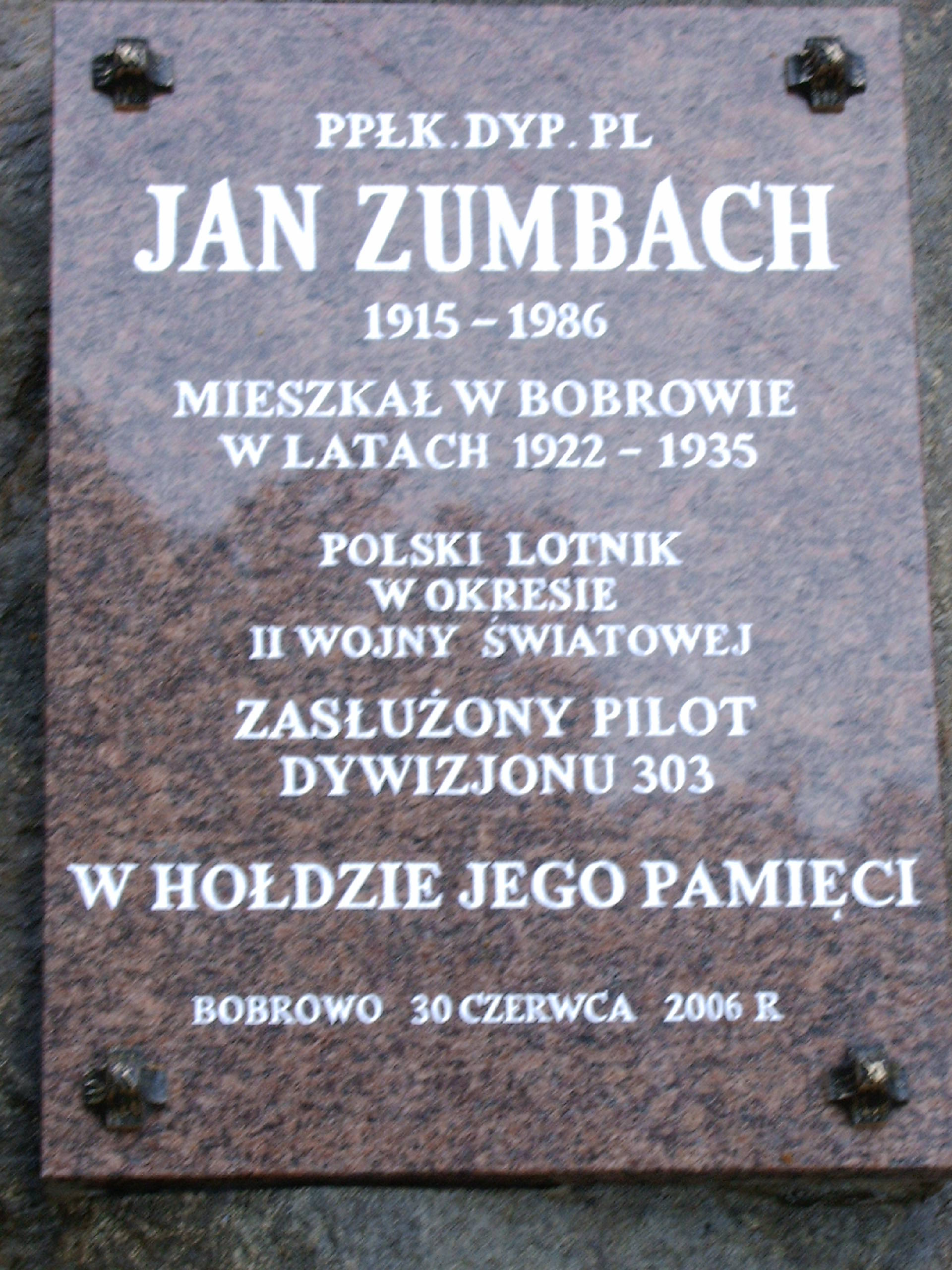
Memorial plaque to Jan Zumbach in his childhood village of Bobrowo

Zumbach died in unclear circumstances on 3 January 1986 in France, and was buried at Powązki Military Cemetery in Warsaw, Poland. The investigation into his death was closed by order of the French authorities without public explanation.

== Decorations ==
Virtuti Militari Crosses are the most prestigious Polish military awards.

Virtuti Militari, Silver Cross
Cross of Valour (Poland), four times
Air Medal (Poland)
Distinguished Flying Cross (United Kingdom) & Bar
1939-1945 Star
War Medal 1939-1945
Defence Medal

== In popular culture ==
Jan Zumbach was portrayed by Iwan Rheon in the 2018 film Hurricane: 303 Squadron.
