= Bogumiłki =

- Village
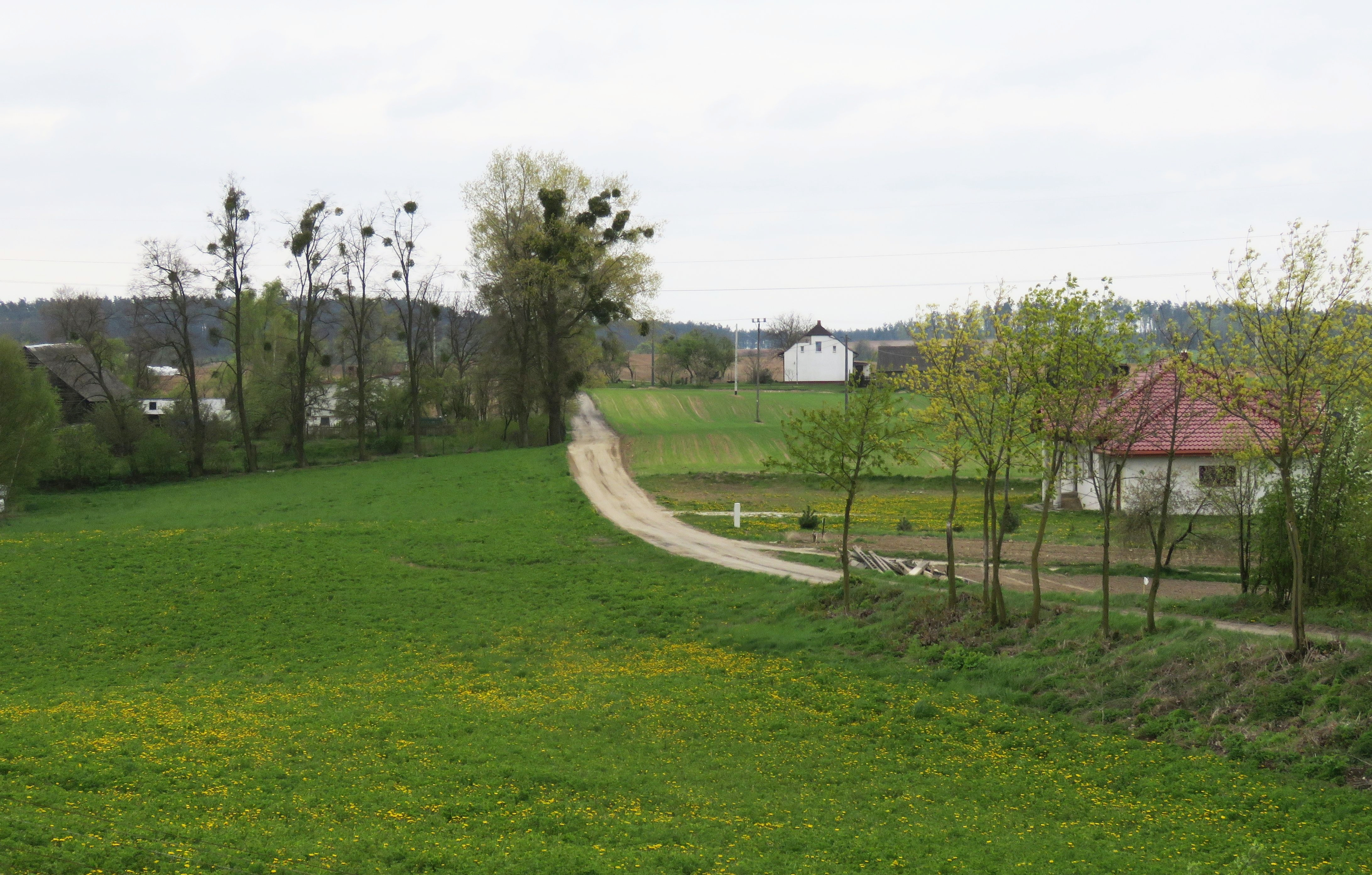

- Location within Poland
- Coordinates: 53°19′14″N 19°17′43″E
- Country: Poland
- Voivodeship: Kuyavian-Pomeranian
- County: Brodnica
- Gmina: Bobrowo

Bogumiłki [bɔɡuˈmiu̯ki] is a village in the administrative district of Gmina Bobrowo, within Brodnica County, Kuyavian-Pomeranian Voivodeship, in north-central Poland.

Population 56.
