= Grzybno, Brodnica County =

Grzybno
- Village
- Location within Poland
- Coordinates: 53°18′N 19°19′E
- Country: Poland
- Voivodeship: Kuyavian-Pomeranian
- County: Brodnica
- Gmina: Bobrowo

Grzybno [ˈɡʐɨbnɔ] is a village in the administrative district of Gmina Bobrowo, within Brodnica County, Kuyavian-Pomeranian Voivodeship, in north-central Poland.

== Population ==
As per census 2021, Grzybno has a population of 316. Among them, 165 are males and 151 females.
