= Czekanów =

Czekanów may refer to the following places:

- Czekanów, Greater Poland Voivodeship (west-central Poland)
- Czekanów, Masovian Voivodeship (east-central Poland)
- Czekanów, Silesian Voivodeship (south Poland)

== See also ==
- Czekanowo (disambiguation)
