= Skurgwy =

- Village
- Location within Poland
- Coordinates: 53°34′N 18°54′E
- Country: Poland
- Voivodeship: Kuyavian-Pomeranian
- County: Grudziądz
- Gmina: Rogóźno
- Population (2021): 253

Skurgwy [ˈskurɡvɨ] is a village in the administrative district of Gmina Rogóźno, within Grudziądz County, Kuyavian-Pomeranian Voivodeship, in north-central Poland.
