= Lisa Młyn =

- Village
- Location within Poland
- Coordinates: 53°18′08″N 19°21′44″E
- Country: Poland
- Voivodeship: Kuyavian-Pomeranian
- County: Brodnica
- Gmina: Bobrowo

Lisa Młyn [ˈlisa ˈmwɨn] is a village in the administrative district of Gmina Bobrowo, within Brodnica County, Kuyavian-Pomeranian Voivodeship, in north-central Poland.
