= Czartówiec =

- Village
- Location within Poland
- Coordinates: 53°14′01″N 19°12′49″E
- Country: Poland
- Voivodeship: Kuyavian-Pomeranian
- County: Brodnica
- Gmina: Bobrowo

Czartówiec [t͡ʂarˈtuvjɛt͡s] is a village in the administrative district of Gmina Bobrowo, within Brodnica County, Kuyavian-Pomeranian Voivodeship, in north-central Poland.
