= Słoszewy =

- Village
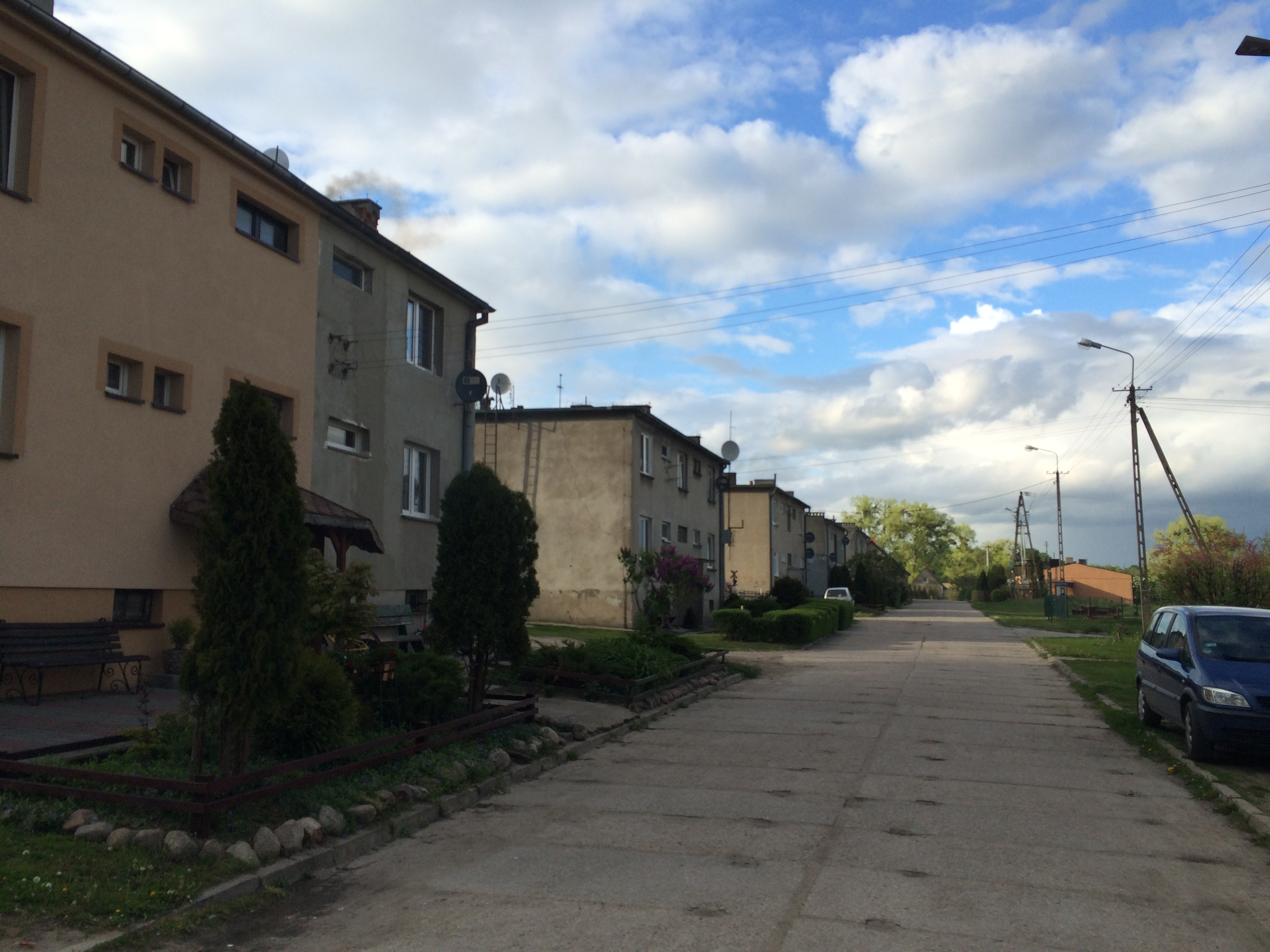

- Location within Poland
- Coordinates: 53°12′29″N 19°15′29″E
- Country: Poland
- Voivodeship: Kuyavian-Pomeranian
- County: Brodnica
- Gmina: Bobrowo

Słoszewy [swɔˈʂɛvɨ] is a village in the administrative district of Gmina Bobrowo, within Brodnica County, Kuyavian-Pomeranian Voivodeship, in north-central Poland.
