= Buczek, Brodnica County =

Buczek
- Village
- Location within Poland
- Coordinates: 53°16′6″N 19°12′15″E
- Country: Poland
- Voivodeship: Kuyavian-Pomeranian
- County: Brodnica
- Gmina: Bobrowo

Buczek [ˈbut͡ʂɛk] is a village in the administrative district of Gmina Bobrowo, within Brodnica County, Kuyavian-Pomeranian Voivodeship, in north-central Poland.
