= Gmina Bobrowo =

Gmina Bobrowo Bobrowo Commune
- Gmina
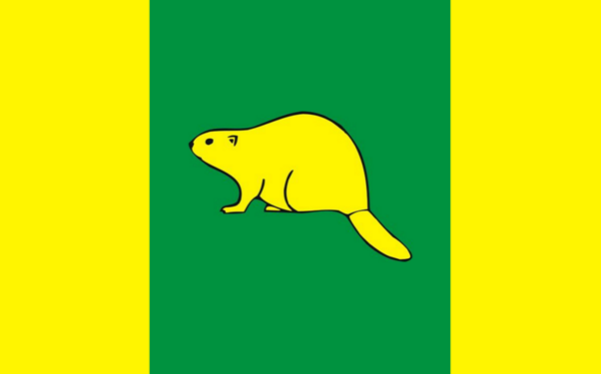
- Flag Coat of arms
- Interactive map of Gmina Bobrowo
- Coordinates (Bobrowo): 53°17′N 19°17′E
- Country: Poland
- Voivodeship: Kuyavian-Pomeranian
- County: Brodnica
- Seat: Bobrowo

Area
  - Total: 146.28 km^{2} (56.48 sq mi)

Population (2014)
  - Total: 6,332
  - Density: 43.29/km^{2} (112.1/sq mi)
- Website: http://www.bobrowo.samorzad.org.pl/

Gmina Bobrowo (German: Bobrau) is a rural gmina (administrative district) in Brodnica County, Kuyavian-Pomeranian Voivodeship, in north-central Poland. Its seat is the village of Bobrowo, which lies approximately 9 kilometres (6 mi) north-west of Brodnica and 53 km (33 mi) north-east of Toruń.

The gmina covers an area of 146.28 square kilometres (56.5 sq mi), and as of 2014 its total population is 6,332.

== Villages ==
Gmina Bobrowo contains the villages and settlements of Anielewo, Bobrowo, Bobrowo-Kolonia, Bogumiłki, Brudzawy, Buczek, Budy, Chojno, Czartówiec, Czekanowo, Dąbrówka, Drużyny, Florencja, Foluszek, Grabówiec, Grzybno, Kawki, Kruszyny, Kruszyny Szlacheckie, Kruszyny-Rumunki, Lisa Młyn, Małki, Nieżywięć, Pasieki, Słoszewy, Smolniki, Tylice, Wądzyn, Wichulec, Wymokłe, Zarośle and Zgniłobłoty.

== Neighbouring gminas ==
Gmina Bobrowo is bordered by the town of Brodnica and by the gminas of Brodnica, Dębowa Łąka, Golub-Dobrzyń, Jabłonowo Pomorskie, Książki, Wąpielsk and Zbiczno.
