= Wichulec =

- Village
- Location within Poland
- Coordinates: 53°19′N 19°19′E
- Country: Poland
- Voivodeship: Kuyavian-Pomeranian
- County: Brodnica
- Gmina: Bobrowo

Wichulec [viˈxulɛt͡s] is a village in the administrative district of Gmina Bobrowo, within Brodnica County, Kuyavian-Pomeranian Voivodeship, in north-central Poland.

Wichulec lies in the historic region of Chełmno Land (Ziemia Chełmińska), an area that was historically part of the State of the Teutonic Order and later incorporated into the Kingdom of Poland. The surrounding area is predominantly agricultural, with farmland and small forested areas characteristic of rural north-central Poland.
