= Bukowiec, Grudziądz County =

Bukowiec
- Village
- Location within Poland
- Coordinates: 53°33′N 19°1′E
- Country: Poland
- Voivodeship: Kuyavian-Pomeranian
- County: Grudziądz
- Gmina: Rogóźno
- Population: 160

Bukowiec [buˈkɔvjɛt͡s] is a village in the administrative district of Gmina Rogóźno, within Grudziądz County, Kuyavian-Pomeranian Voivodeship, in north-central Poland.
