= Kłódka, Kuyavian-Pomeranian Voivodeship =

Kłódka
- Village
- Location within Poland
- Coordinates: 53°30′34″N 18°54′25″E
- Country: Poland
- Voivodeship: Kuyavian-Pomeranian
- County: Grudziądz
- Gmina: Rogóźno
- Population: 290

Kłódka [ˈkwutka] is a village in the administrative district of Gmina Rogóźno, within Grudziądz County, Kuyavian-Pomeranian Voivodeship, in north-central Poland.
