= Wymokłe =

- Village
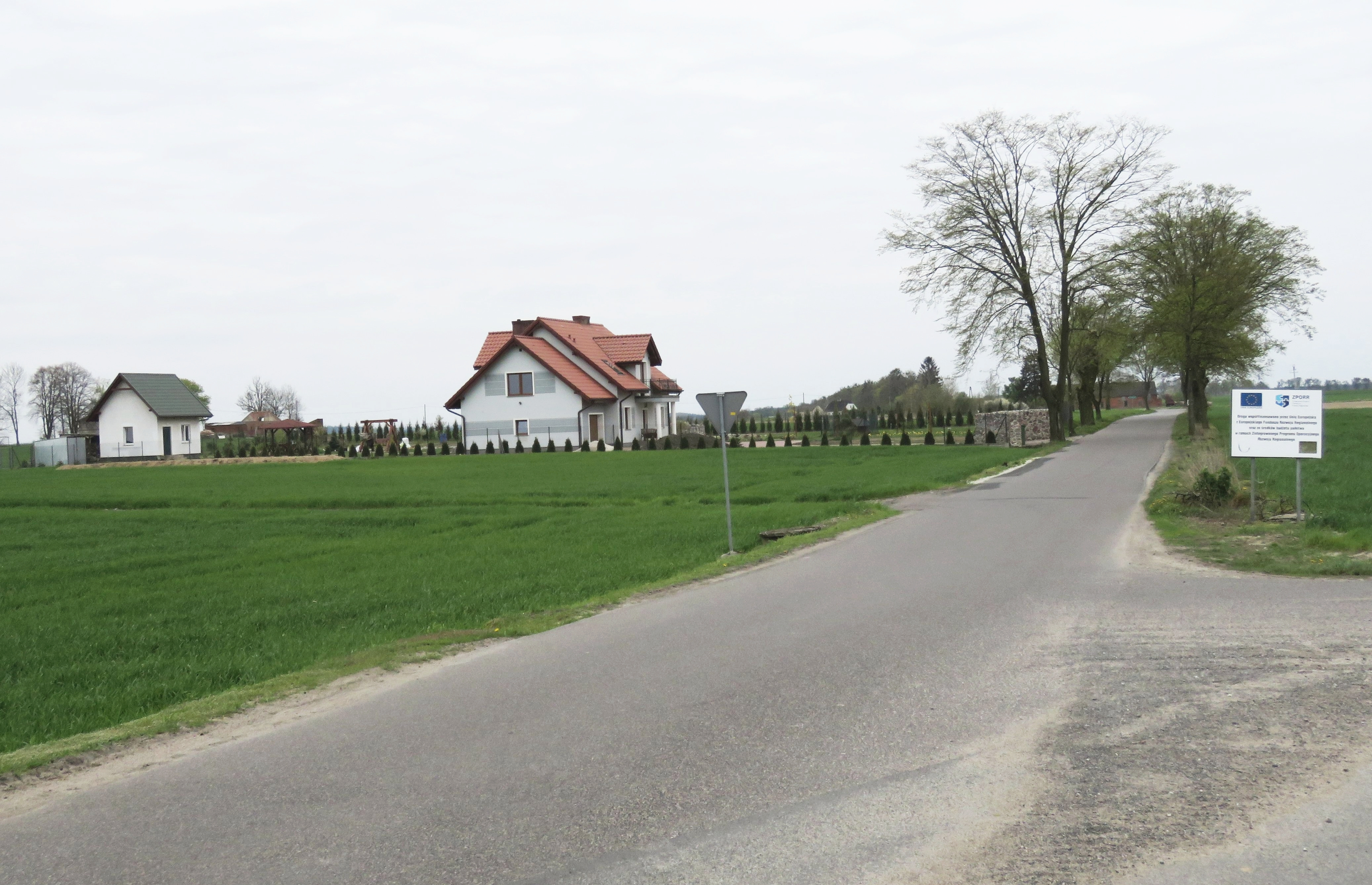

- Location within Poland
- Coordinates: 53°14′N 19°16′E
- Country: Poland
- Voivodeship: Kuyavian-Pomeranian
- County: Brodnica
- Gmina: Bobrowo

Wymokłe [vɨˈmɔkwɛ] is a village in the administrative district of Gmina Bobrowo, within Brodnica County, Kuyavian-Pomeranian Voivodeship, in north-central Poland.
