= Kruszyny, Kuyavian-Pomeranian Voivodeship =

Kruszyny
- Village
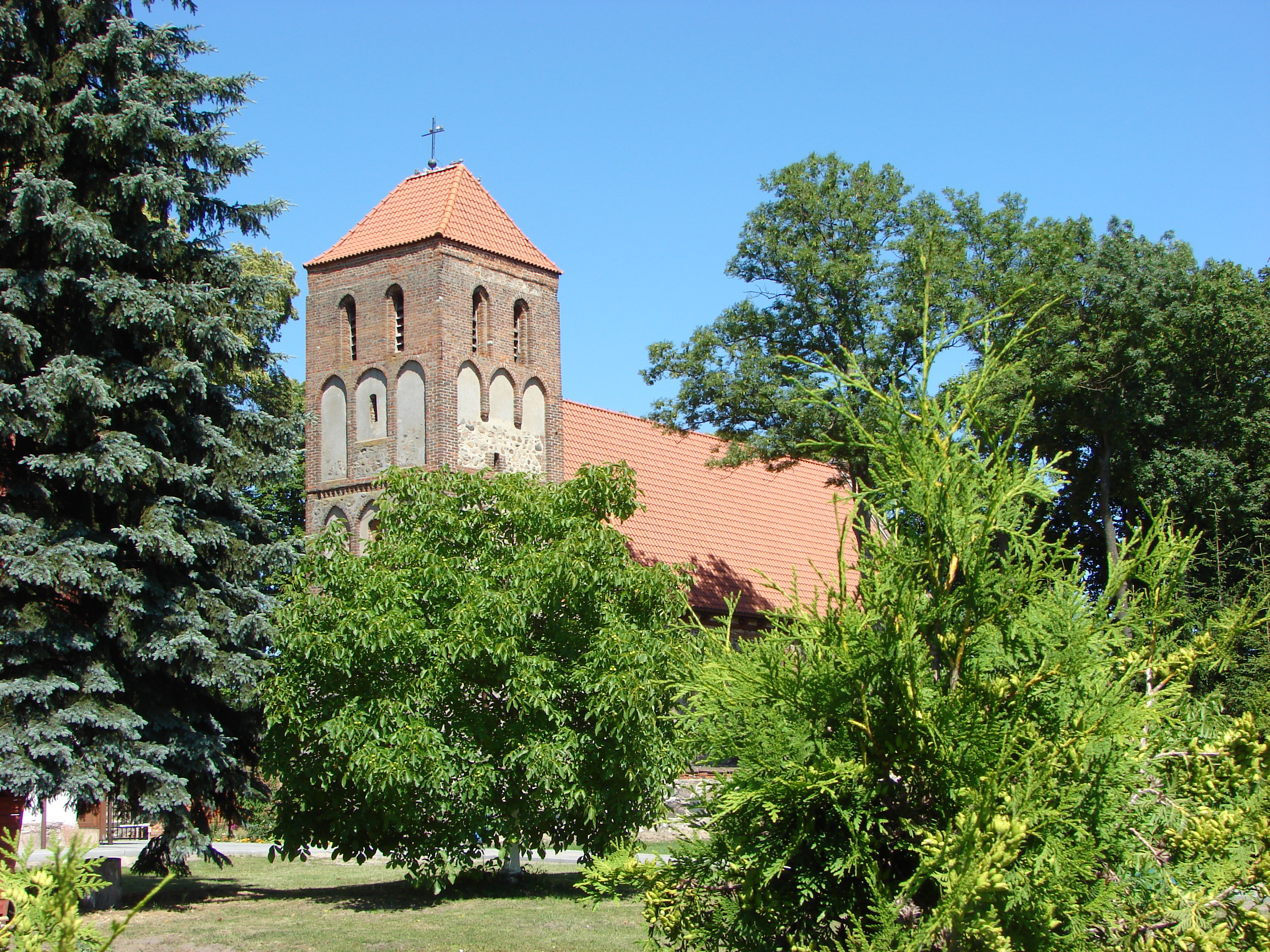
- Parish church of St. Nicholas, first half of the 14th century.

- Location within Poland
- Coordinates: 53°19′N 19°11′E
- Country: Poland
- Voivodeship: Kuyavian-Pomeranian
- County: Brodnica
- Gmina: Bobrowo

Kruszyny [kruˈʂɨnɨ] is a village in the administrative district of Gmina Bobrowo, within Brodnica County, Kuyavian-Pomeranian Voivodeship, in north-central Poland.
