= Szembruk =

- Village
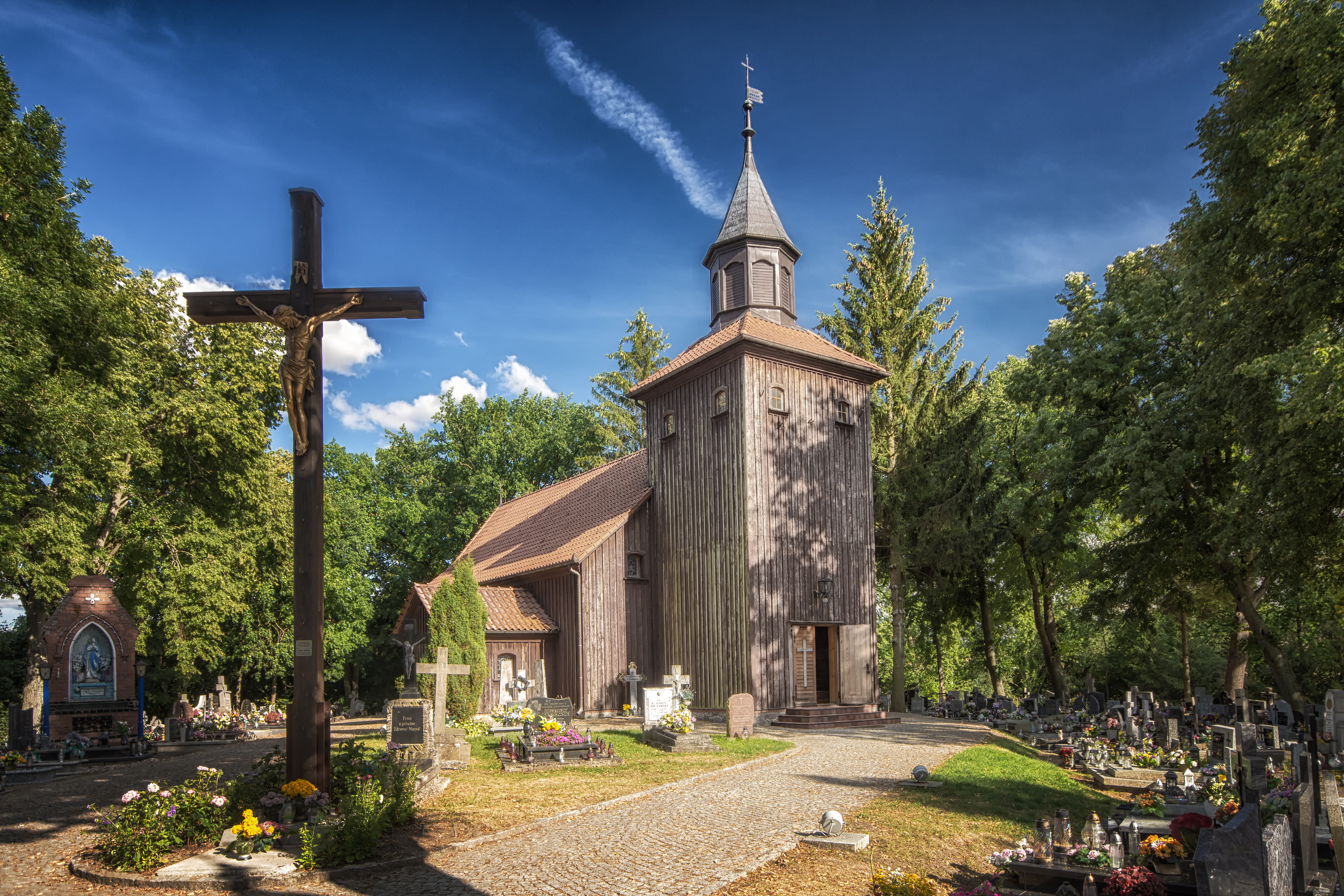
- Church of Saint Bartholomew in Szembruk

- Location within Poland
- Coordinates: 53°34′5″N 19°1′48″E
- Country: Poland
- Voivodeship: Kuyavian-Pomeranian
- County: Grudziądz
- Gmina: Rogóźno
- Population: 580

Szembruk [ˈʂɛmbruk] is a village in the administrative district of Gmina Rogóźno, within Grudziądz County, Kuyavian-Pomeranian Voivodeship, in north-central Poland.
