= Gubiny =

- Village
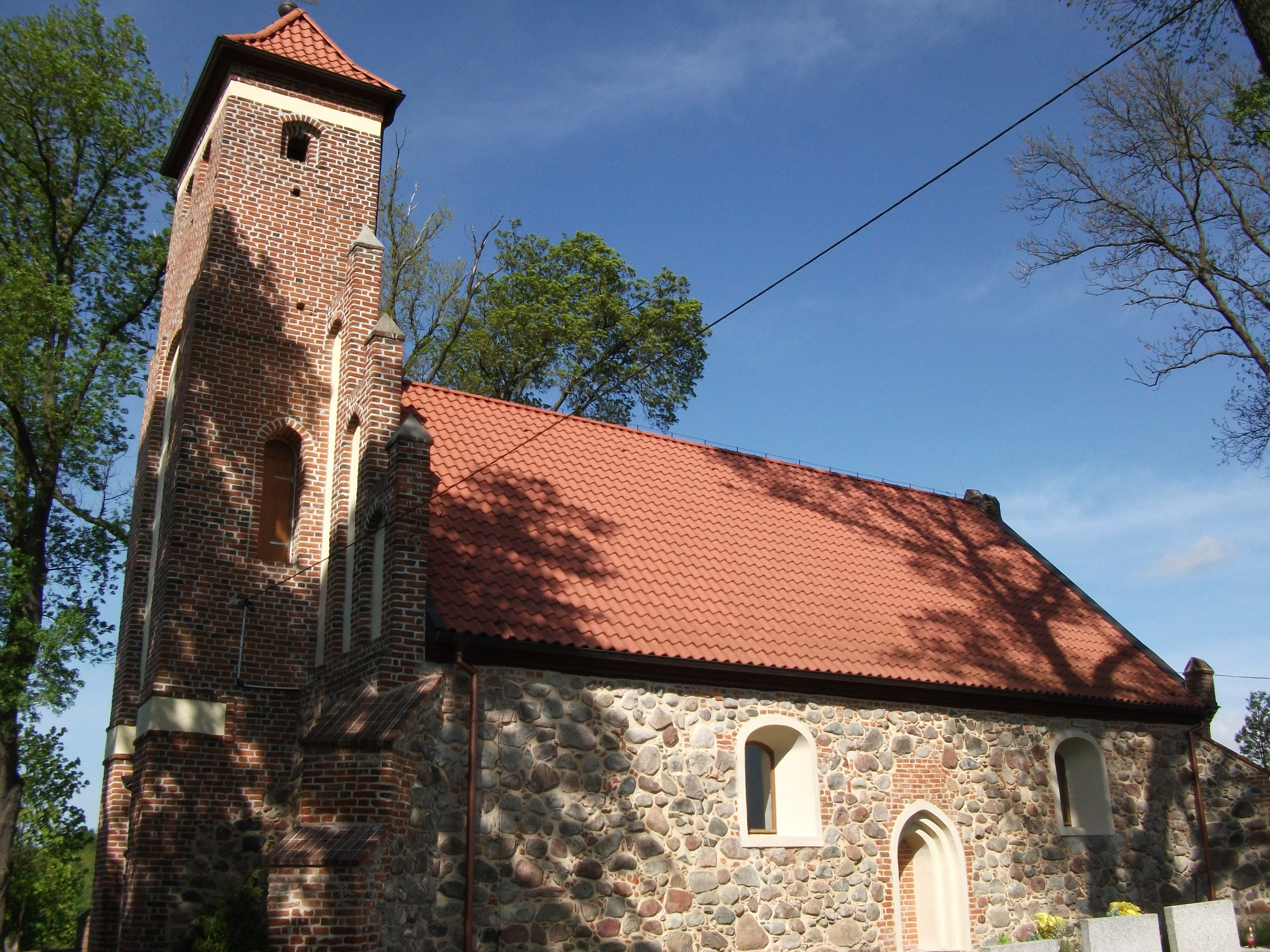
- Exaltation of the Holy Cross church in Gubiny

- Location within Poland
- Coordinates: 53°33′41″N 18°55′43″E
- Country: Poland
- Voivodeship: Kuyavian-Pomeranian
- County: Grudziądz
- Gmina: Rogóźno
- Population: 200

Gubiny [ɡuˈbinɨ] is a village in the administrative district of Gmina Rogóźno, within Grudziądz County, Kuyavian-Pomeranian Voivodeship, in north-central Poland.
