= Drużyny =

- Village
- Location within Poland
- Coordinates: 53°17′N 19°19′E
- Country: Poland
- Voivodeship: Kuyavian-Pomeranian
- County: Brodnica
- Gmina: Bobrowo

Drużyny [druˈʐɨnɨ] is a village in the administrative district of Gmina Bobrowo, within Brodnica County, Kuyavian-Pomeranian Voivodeship, in north-central Poland.
