= Bobrowo, Kuyavian-Pomeranian Voivodeship =

Bobrowo
- Village
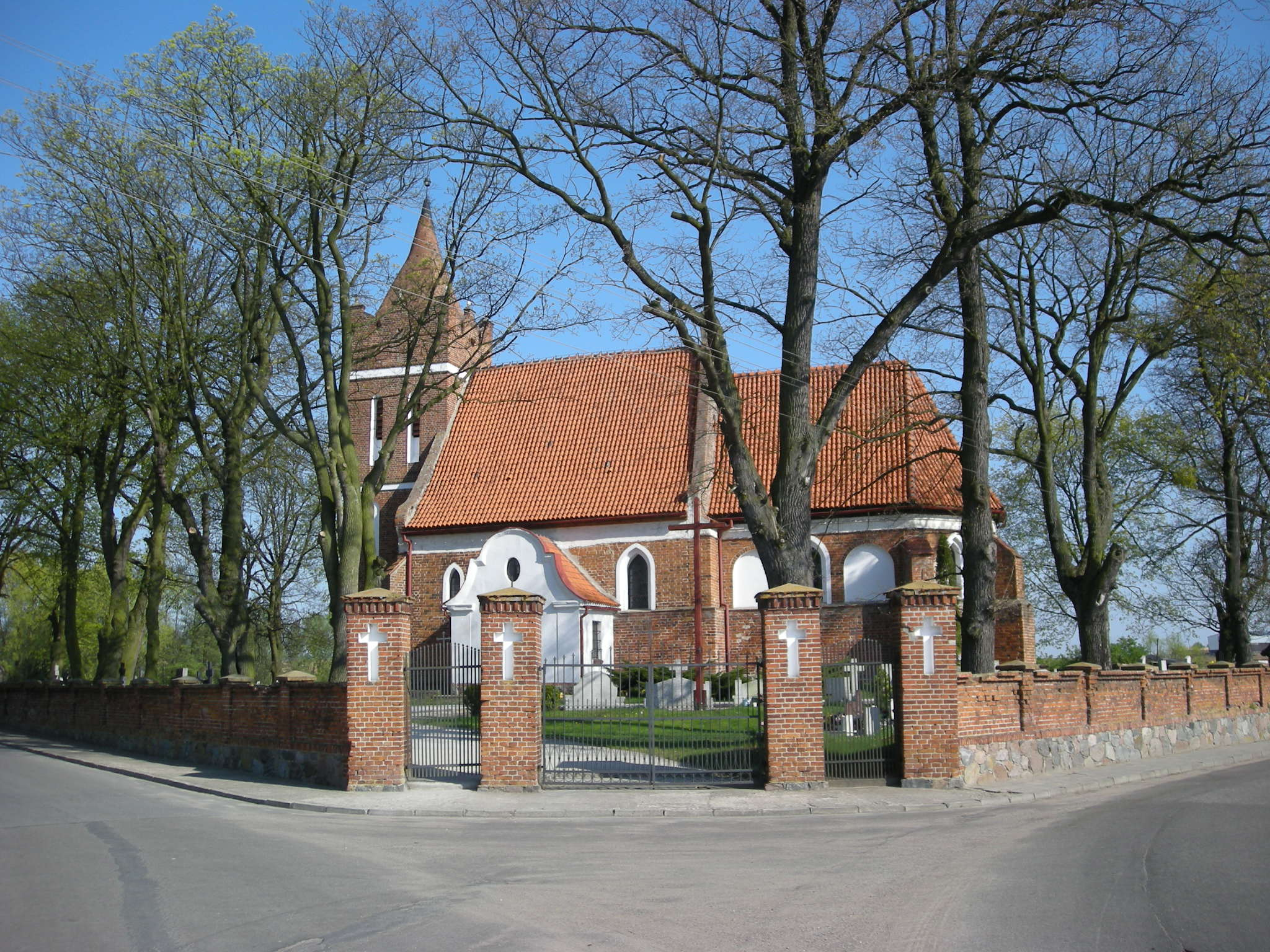
- Church of Saint James

- Location within Poland
- Coordinates: 53°17′N 19°17′E
- Country: Poland
- Voivodeship: Kuyavian-Pomeranian
- County: Brodnica
- Gmina: Bobrowo
- Time zone: UTC+1 (CET)
  - Summer (DST): UTC+2 (CEST)
- Vehicle registration: CBR

Bobrowo [bɔˈbrɔvɔ] is a village in Brodnica County, Kuyavian-Pomeranian Voivodeship, in north-central Poland. It is the seat of the gmina (administrative district) called Gmina Bobrowo.

== History ==
In 1634, the starost of Pokrzywno granted the village to the Benedictines from Grudziądz. It remained their possession until 1772, and later on it passed to Polish nobility, including the Jezierski and Czapski families.

During the German occupation of Poland (World War II), the occupiers forced local Poles to sign the Deutsche Volksliste. Those who refused were beaten to death by the Germans, and their bodies were laid in front of the German police station for several days to terrorize the population.

== Notable people ==
- Jan Zumbach, Polish World War II fighter ace, lived in the village in 1922–1935
