= Florencja, Kuyavian-Pomeranian Voivodeship =

Florencja
- Village
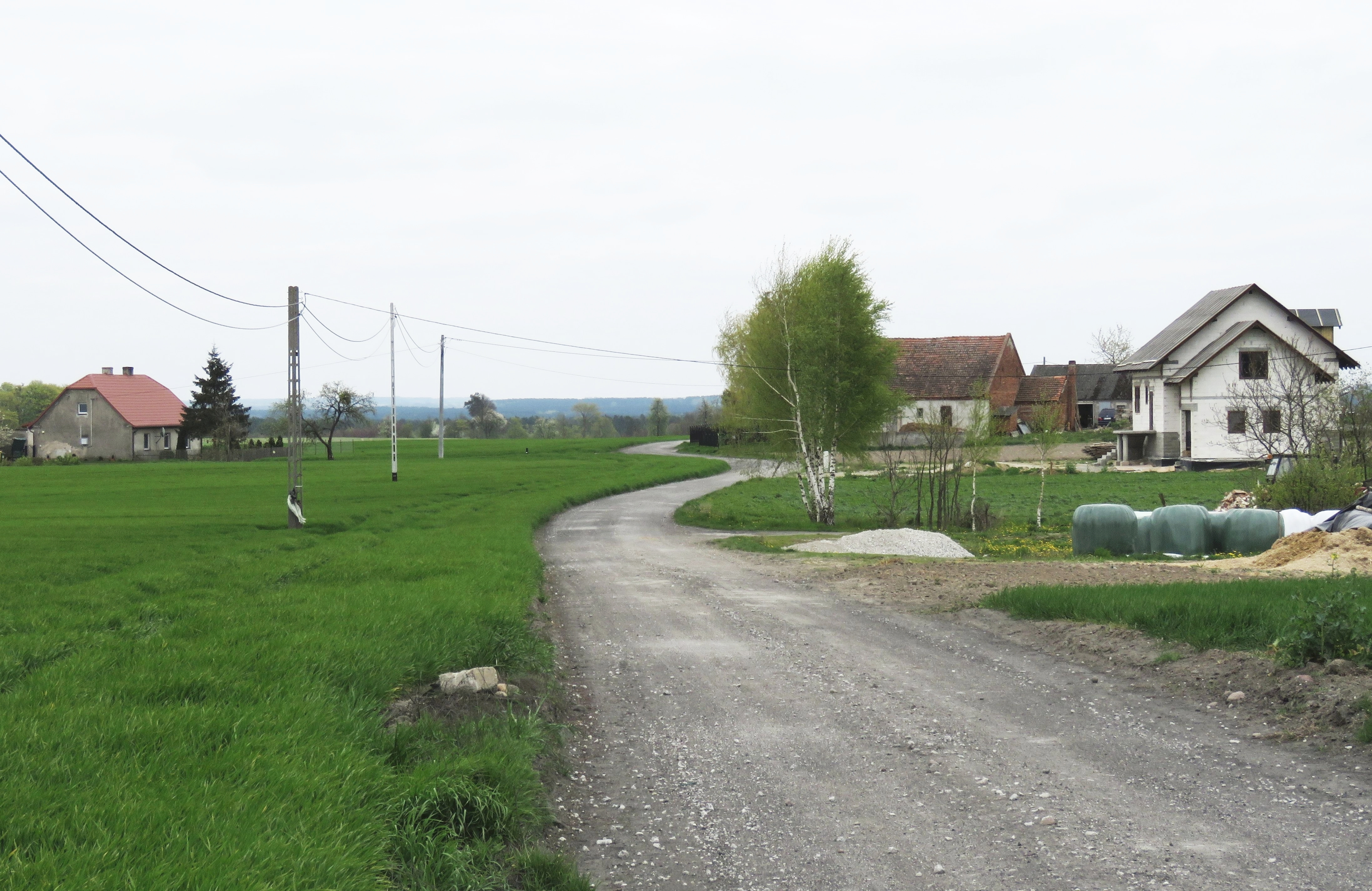
- Road in Florencja

- Location within Poland
- Coordinates: 53°13′13″N 19°16′0″E
- Country: Poland
- Voivodeship: Kuyavian-Pomeranian
- County: Brodnica
- Gmina: Bobrowo

Florencja (Polish pronunciation: [flɔˈrɛnt͡sja]) is a village in the administrative district of Gmina Bobrowo, within Brodnica County, Kuyavian-Pomeranian Voivodeship, in north-central Poland.
