= Rogóźno-Zamek =

- Village
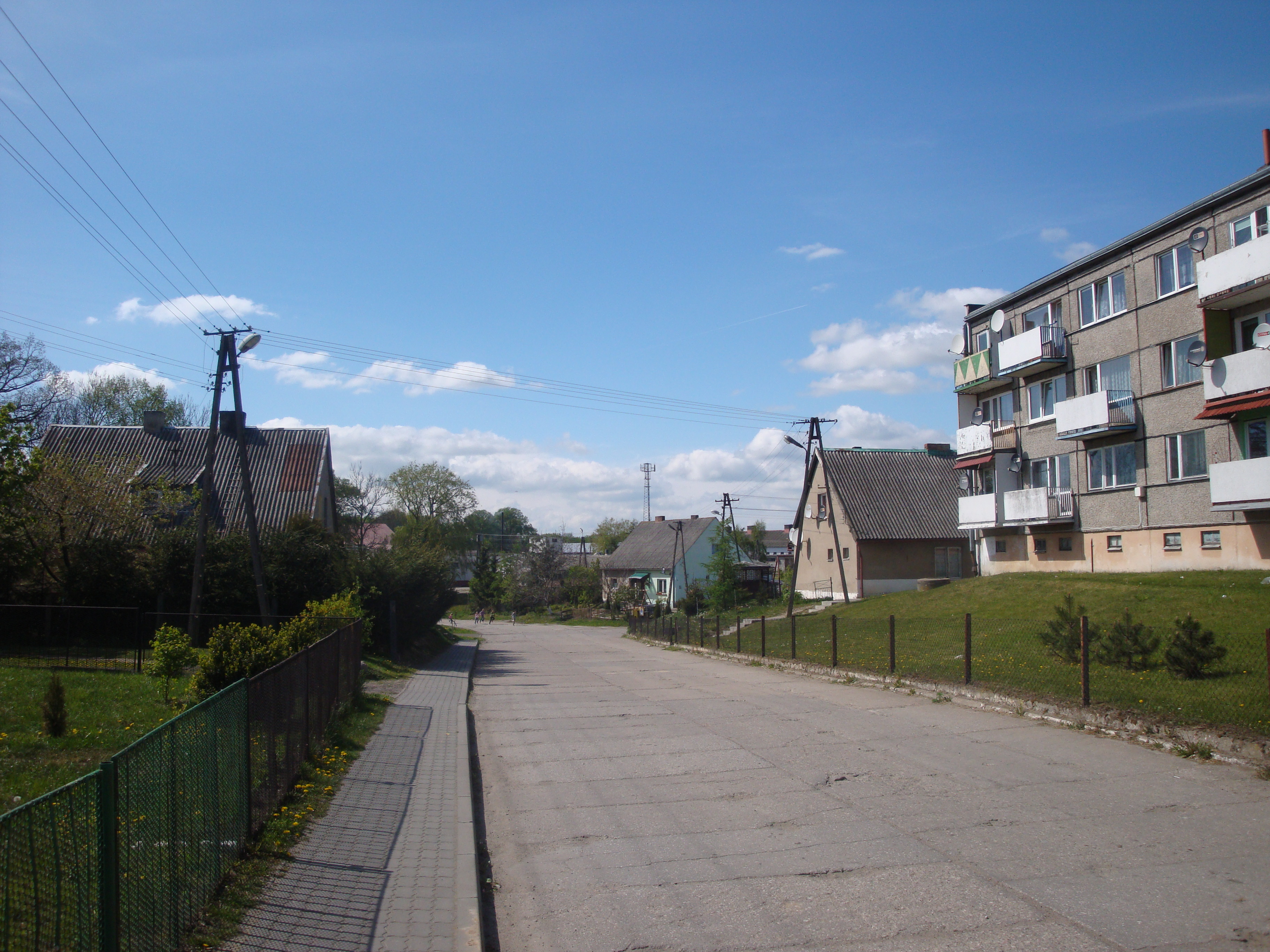

- Location within Poland
- Coordinates: 53°31′16″N 18°51′31″E
- Country: Poland
- Voivodeship: Kuyavian-Pomeranian
- County: Grudziądz
- Gmina: Rogóźno
- Population: 470

Rogóźno-Zamek [rɔˈɡuʑnɔ ˈzamɛk] is a village in the administrative district of Gmina Rogóźno, within Grudziądz County, Kuyavian-Pomeranian Voivodeship, in north-central Poland.
