= Zarośle, Gmina Bobrowo =

Zarośle
- Village
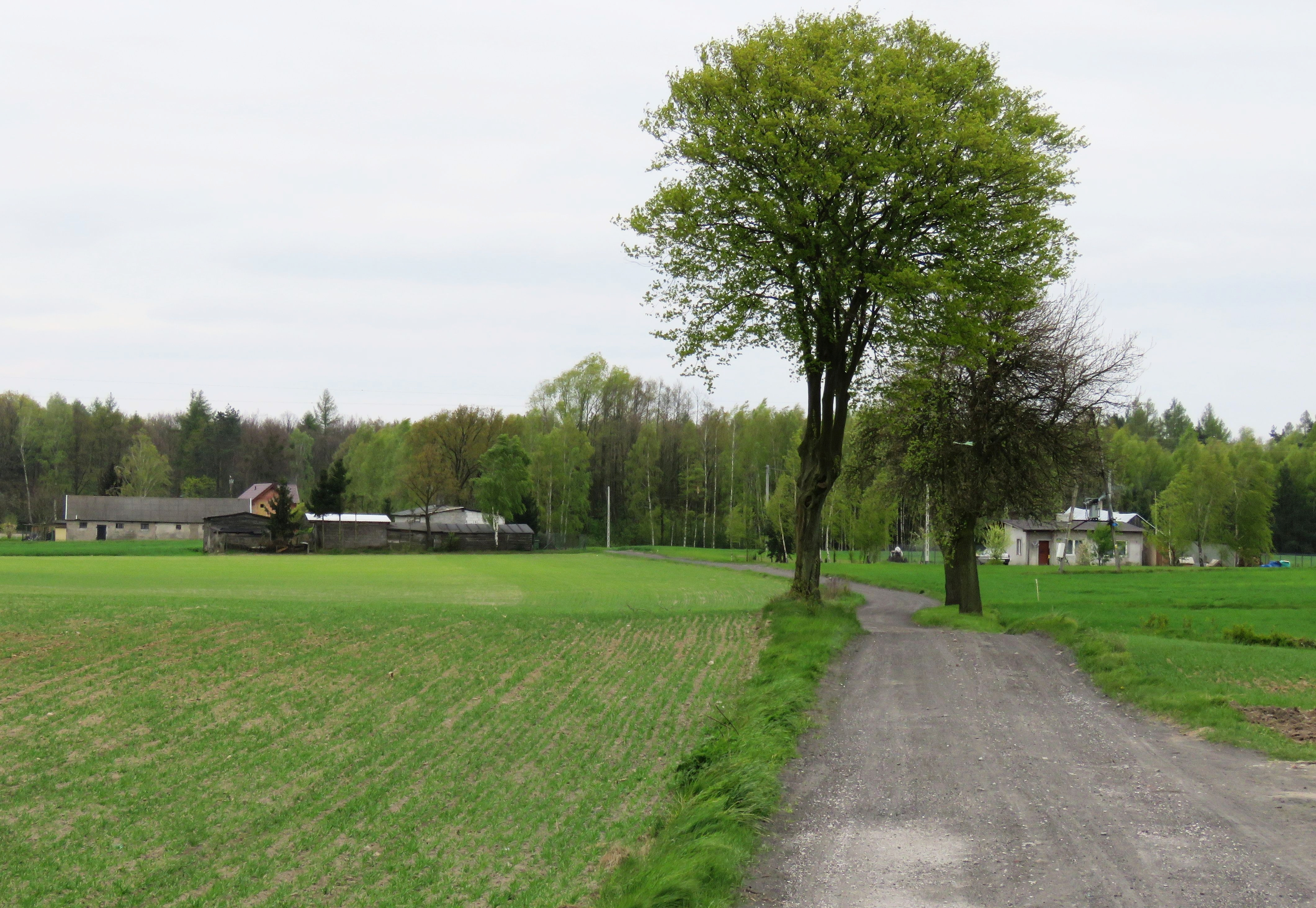

- Location within Poland
- Coordinates: 53°15′03″N 19°14′11″E
- Country: Poland
- Voivodeship: Kuyavian-Pomeranian
- County: Brodnica
- Gmina: Bobrowo

Zarośle [zaˈrɔɕlɛ] is a village in the administrative district of Gmina Bobrowo, within Brodnica County, Kuyavian-Pomeranian Voivodeship, in north-central Poland.
