= Chojno, Brodnica County =

Chojno
- Village
- Location within Poland
- Coordinates: 53°15′N 19°18′E
- Country: Poland
- Voivodeship: Kuyavian-Pomeranian
- County: Brodnica
- Gmina: Bobrowo

Chojno (Polish pronunciation: [ˈxɔjnɔ]) is a village in the administrative district of Gmina Bobrowo, within Brodnica County, Kuyavian-Pomeranian Voivodeship, in north-central Poland.
