= Kawki, Kuyavian-Pomeranian Voivodeship =

Kawki
- Village
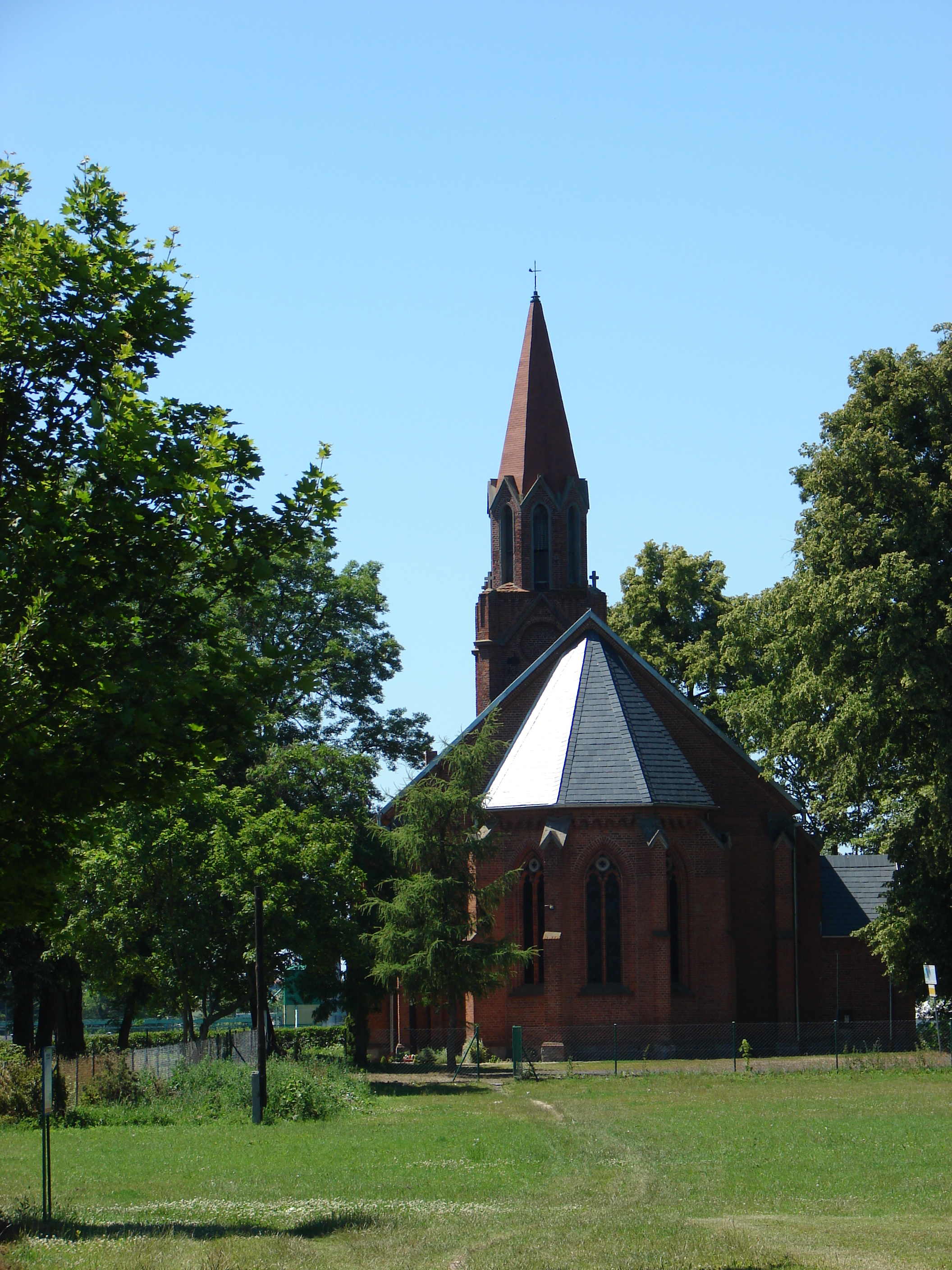
- Church of Saint Anthony. Built 1867.

- Location within Poland
- Coordinates: 53°14′N 19°12′E
- Country: Poland
- Voivodeship: Kuyavian-Pomeranian
- County: Brodnica
- Gmina: Bobrowo

Kawki [ˈkafki] is a village in the administrative district of Gmina Bobrowo, within Brodnica County, Kuyavian-Pomeranian Voivodeship, in north-central Poland.
