= Budy, Grudziądz County =

Budy
- Village
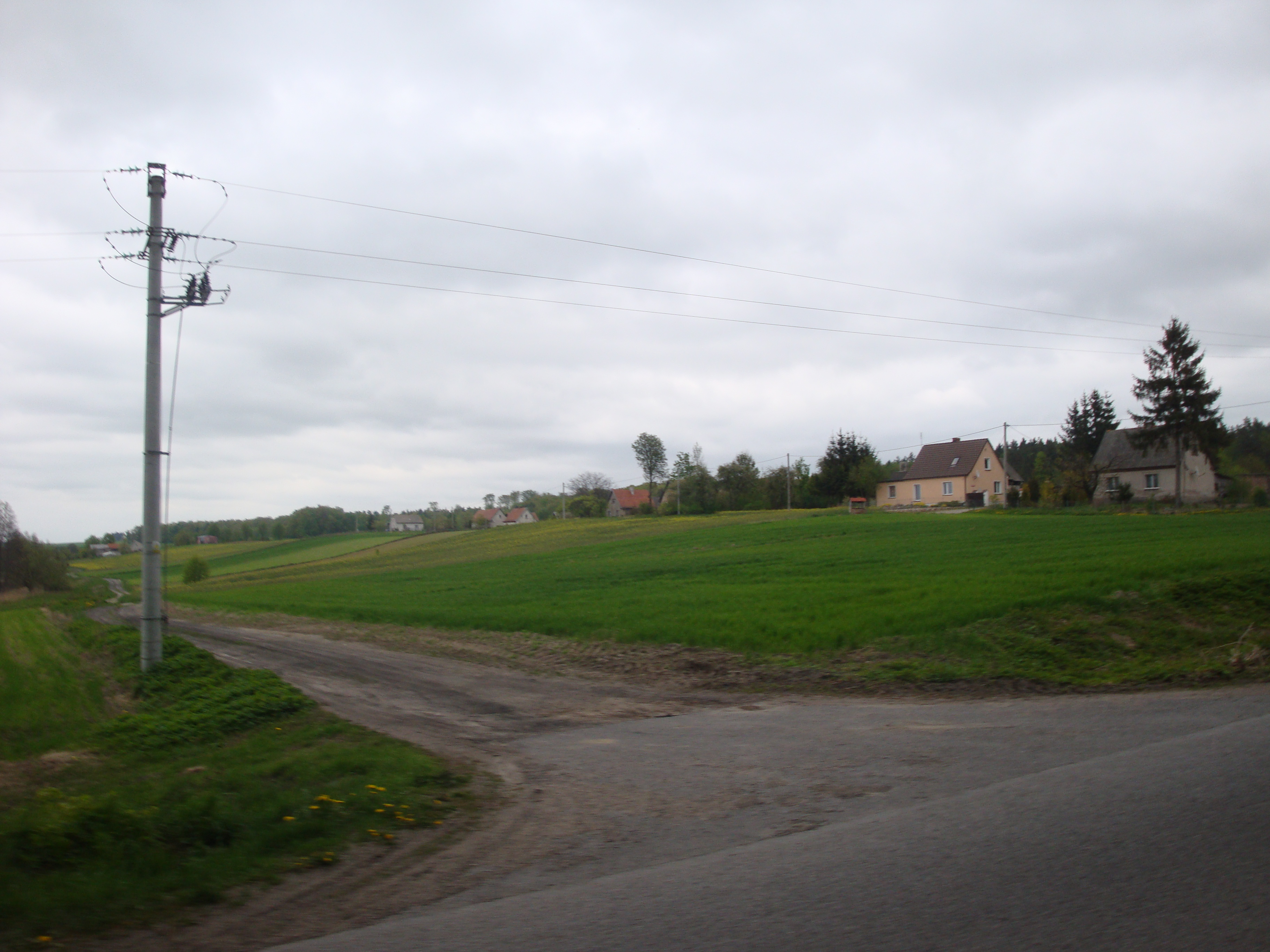

- Location within Poland
- Coordinates: 53°31′08.97″N 18°55′24.02″E
- Country: Poland
- Voivodeship: Kuyavian-Pomeranian
- County: Grudziądz
- Gmina: Rogóźno
- Population: 100

Budy [ˈbudɨ] is a village in the administrative district of Gmina Rogóźno, within Grudziądz County, Kuyavian-Pomeranian Voivodeship, in north-central Poland.
