= Czekanowo, Kuyavian-Pomeranian Voivodeship =

Czekanowo
- Village
- Location within Poland
- Coordinates: 53°18′N 19°16′E
- Country: Poland
- Voivodeship: Kuyavian-Pomeranian
- County: Brodnica
- Gmina: Bobrowo
- Population: 200

Czekanowo [t͡ʂɛkaˈnɔvɔ] is a village in the administrative district of Gmina Bobrowo, within Brodnica County, Kuyavian-Pomeranian Voivodeship, in north-central Poland.
