= Gmina Rogóźno =

Gmina Rogóźno Rogóźno Commune
- Gmina
- Coat of arms
- Interactive map of Gmina Rogóźno
- Coordinates (Rogóźno): 53°32′8″N 18°55′41″E
- Country: Poland
- Voivodeship: Kuyavian-Pomeranian
- County: Grudziądz County
- Seat: Rogóźno

Area
  - Total: 115.74 km^{2} (44.69 sq mi)

Population (2006)
  - Total: 4,068
  - Density: 35.15/km^{2} (91.03/sq mi)
- Website: http://www.rogozno.ug.gov.pl/

Gmina Rogóźno is a rural gmina (administrative district) in Grudziądz County, Kuyavian-Pomeranian Voivodeship, in north-central Poland. Its seat is the village of Rogóźno, which lies approximately 12 kilometres (7 mi) north-east of Grudziądz and 60 km (37 mi) north of Toruń.

The gmina covers an area of 115.74 square kilometres (44.7 sq mi), and as of 2006 its total population is 4,068.

== Villages ==
Gmina Rogóźno contains the villages and settlements of Białochowo, Budy, Bukowiec, Gubiny, Kłódka, Rogóźno, Rogóźno-Zamek, Skurgwy, Szembruczek, Szembruk and Zarośle.

== Neighbouring gminas ==
Gmina Rogóźno is bordered by the city of Grudziądz and by the gminas of Gardeja, Grudziądz, Gruta, Łasin and Sadlinki.
