= Szembruczek =

- Village
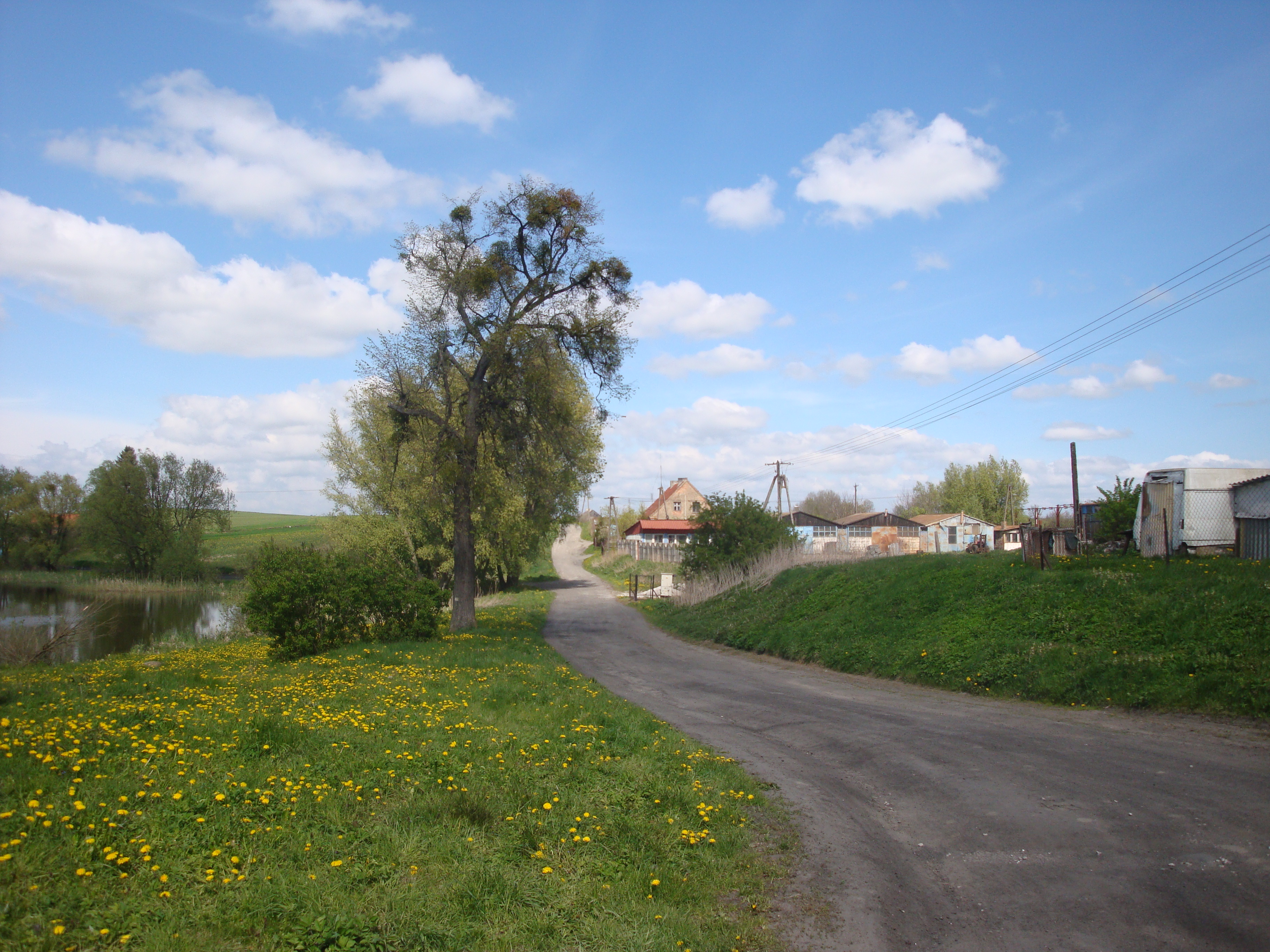

- Location within Poland
- Coordinates: 53°33′N 19°0′E
- Country: Poland
- Voivodeship: Kuyavian-Pomeranian
- County: Grudziądz
- Gmina: Rogóźno
- Population: 230

Szembruczek [ʂɛmˈbrut͡ʂɛk] is a village in the administrative district of Gmina Rogóźno, within Grudziądz County, Kuyavian-Pomeranian Voivodeship, in north-central Poland.
