= Smolniki, Brodnica County =

Smolniki
- Village
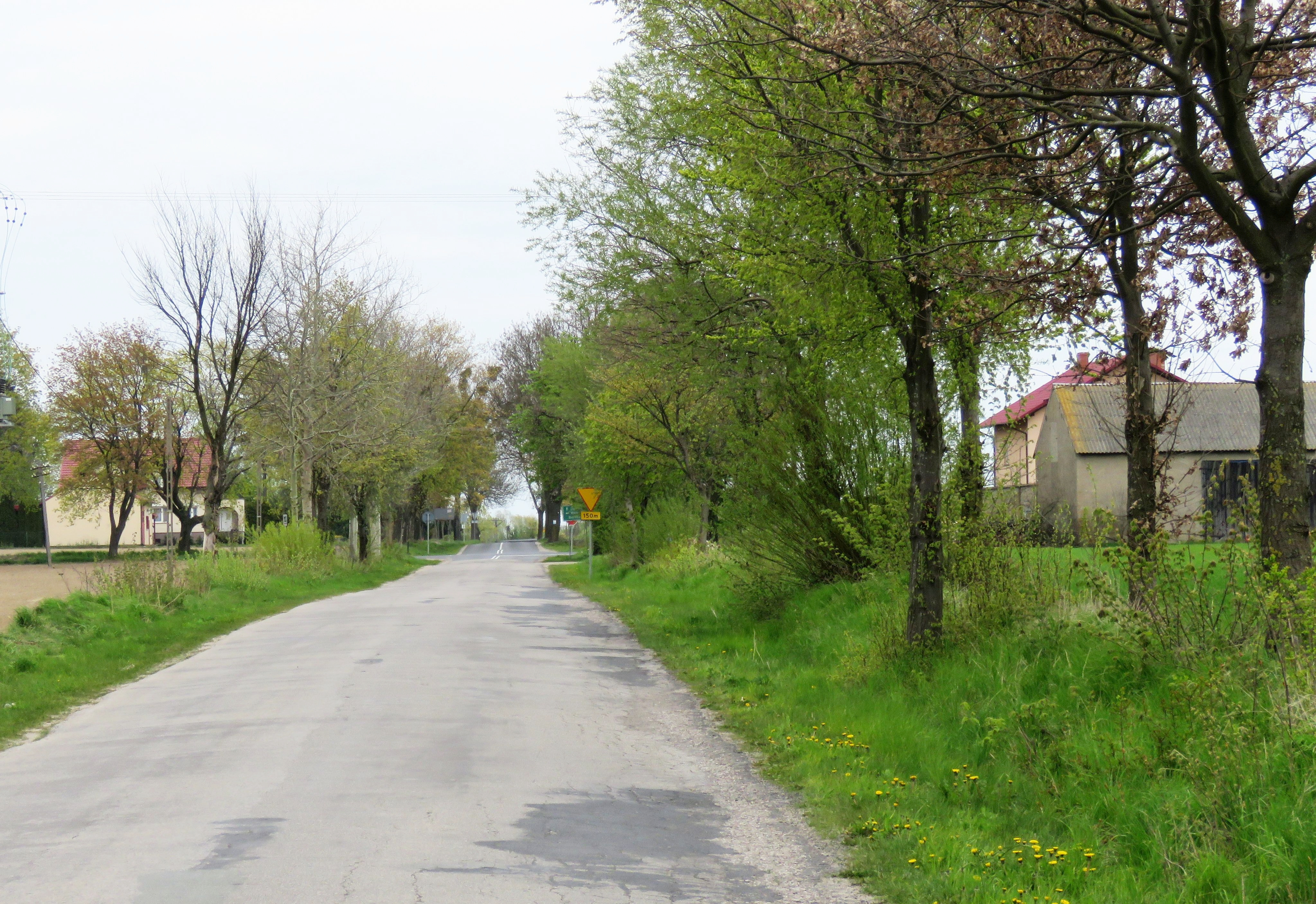
- Street of Smolniki, Brodnica County

- Location within Poland
- Coordinates: 53°16′22″N 19°15′53″E
- Country: Poland
- Voivodeship: Kuyavian-Pomeranian
- County: Brodnica
- Gmina: Bobrowo

Smolniki [smɔlˈniki] is a village in the administrative district of Gmina Bobrowo, within Brodnica County, Kuyavian-Pomeranian Voivodeship, in north-central Poland.
