= Budy, Gmina Bobrowo =

Budy
- Village
- Location within Poland
- Coordinates: 53°16′N 19°19′E
- Country: Poland
- Voivodeship: Kuyavian-Pomeranian
- County: Brodnica
- Gmina: Bobrowo
- Population: 100

Budy [ˈbudɨ] is a village in the administrative district of Gmina Bobrowo, within Brodnica County, Kuyavian-Pomeranian Voivodeship, in north-central Poland.
