= Budy, Russia =

Rural locality in Kovylkinsky District, Mordovia, Russia

Coordinates: 53°58′11″N 43°56′20″E

Budy (Russian: Буды) is a village in Kovylkinsky District of the Republic of Mordovia, Russia.
