= Budy, Bytów County =

Budy
- Village
- Location within Poland
- Coordinates: 53°57′2″N 17°30′8″E
- Country: Poland
- Voivodeship: Pomeranian
- County: Bytów
- Gmina: Lipnica

Budy [ˈbudɨ] is a village in the administrative district of Gmina Lipnica, within Bytów County, Pomeranian Voivodeship, in northern Poland.
