= Chekanovo =

Chekanovo Чеканово
- Settlement
- Location within Altai Krai Location within Russia
- Coordinates: 51°06′N 82°03′E
- Country: Russia
- Region: Altai Krai
- District: Tretyakovsky District
- Time zone: UTC+7:00

Chekanovo (Russian: Чеканово) is a rural locality (a settlement) in Korbolikhinsky Selsoviet, Tretyakovsky District, Altai Krai, Russia. The population was 3 as of 2013. There is 1 street.

== Geography ==
Chekanovo is located 11 km north of Staroaleyskoye (the district's administrative centre) by road. Korbolikha is the nearest rural locality.
