= Łopatki, Wąbrzeźno County =

Łopatki
- Village
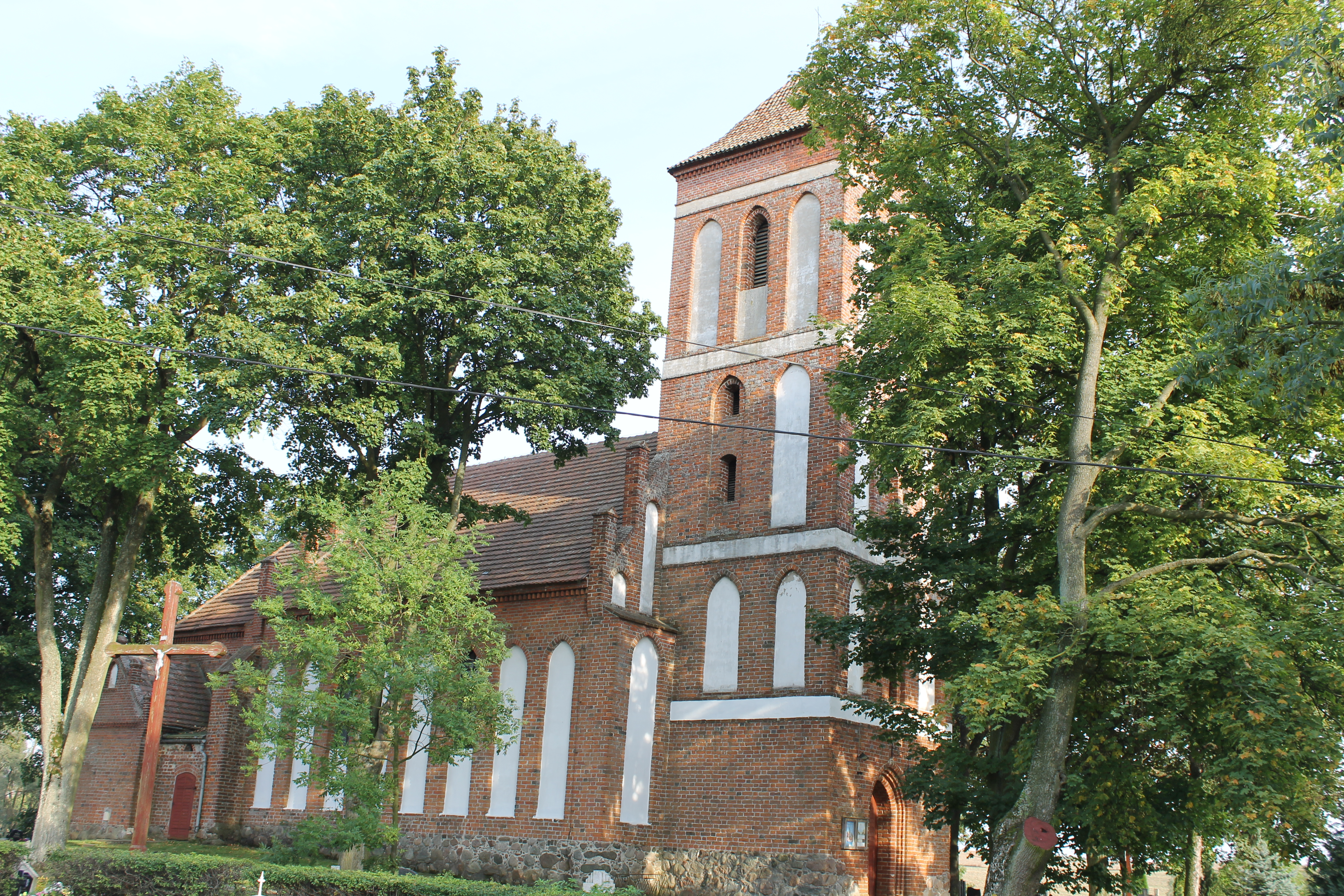
- Gothic Saint Mary Magdalene church

- Location within Poland
- Coordinates: 53°19′43″N 19°00′38″E
- Country: Poland
- Voivodeship: Kuyavian-Pomeranian
- County: Wąbrzeźno
- Gmina: Książki
- Time zone: UTC+1 (CET)
  - Summer (DST): UTC+2 (CEST)
- Vehicle registration: CWA

Łopatki [wɔˈpatki] is a village in the administrative district of Gmina Książki, within Wąbrzeźno County, Kuyavian-Pomeranian Voivodeship, in north-central Poland.

== History ==
In the distant past and in the period of the first Piasts this area was covered with impenetrable forests and impassable bogs, full of wild animals, like any other part of Poland at that time. It was already inhabited. People who lived there were providing the court with wooden paddles (“paddle” – “łopata” in Polish, so the name Łopatki stems from “łopata”). Łopatki is mentioned by the Order of Teutonic Knights' chronicler Konrad. He writes that Łopatki was under the control of the Teutonic commander who resided in Kowalewo and then in Grudziądz. In Teutonic times the area was colonised by people from Silesia. The village was called then Kieslingswalde. There was a church in the settlement then. The village covered 84 włóka. It was completely destroyed by the fire in 1410. Only a church remained but it was plundered in 1410, during the war. It was burnt a second time in 1656 and was not used for a long time. In 1414-1438 the land was lying fallow. It was gradually reclaimed and in 1446 only 4 włóka were not used. Over the course of time, for some unknown reason, the settlement became depopulated. The land became the property of Jerzy from Konopatu. He erected some buildings. In 1640 Łopatki consisted of: a manor, free sołectwo (the lowest unit of local administration, usually comprising a single village; village council office nowadays), 2 lemaństwo (a land given to a soldier). There lived more than 40 peasant families, a lot of them were poor and had to hire themselves out for work. Inhabitants were regarded as the best taxpayers. Łopatki was almost completely plundered during the Second Swedish War. After the war, the village was colonised by Germans. On 20 April 1769 Łopatki was given to Mikołaj Czapski, then the estate was requisitioned by the Prussian government. Łopatki Niemieckie (German Łopatki), Łopatki Polskie (Polish Łopatki), as well as Buczek, became the property of Lubtov, a German major. After colonising a patron estate and a maron “Braunsrode”, Jarantowice, Sitno and Frydrychowo (from the parish Wąbrzeźno) was added to the parish to reinforce it. When the estate Łopatki became the owner of a patron land, it was obliged in 1853 to rebuild a church. That duty was taken over by the canon Sampławski from Radzyń in 1864 because the Catholic community had only 282 inhabitants. When German settlers where founding the village Niemieckie Łopatki, sołectwo was ruled by Rafał Prądzyński. Prądzyński family owned sołectwo with lemaństwo covering 379 morga until 1837 when the estate became the property of the Estate Łopatki. Freehold was granted in 1826. The boundaries of the land were changed because the estate wanted to have its land enclosed within one complex.

In 1928 Łopatki was inhabited by 2087 Poles, 1000 Germans, 923 Baptists.

During the German occupation of Poland (World War II), in 1939, it was the site of the Łopatki massacre, in which the German police, SS and Selbstschutz murdered over 2,000 Polish inhabitants of the nearby town of Wąbrzeźno and its surroundings (see Nazi crimes against the Polish nation).

== Monuments ==
- the early medieval fortification
- the parish church dedicated to Saint Maria Magdalena from the 14th century
- a manor house, the 19th/20th century
- a primary school from the beginning of the 20th century
- a cemetery where people killed in the Second World War in Łopatki are buried - A place where sand was mined, a diameter of 70 m, located by the road Łopatki-Szczuplinki (about 2 km). Poles were killed there by the Nazis in autumn 1939. Germans were bringing people who were captured and imprisoned in Wąbrzeźno there. They shot about 150 prisoners each time. The killed were buried in mass graves. The massacre lasted for 6 weeks, from the beginning of December 1939. In 1994, in order to cover up the crime, Nazis exhumed and burnt corpses. The exact number of the killed is unknown. The documents of Rada Ochrony Pomników Walki i Męczeństwa (The Council for the Protection of Struggle and Martyrdom Sites) mention about 2400 victims, including 25 women and a few priests. There is a memorial commemorating the victims in that place now.
