= Książki =

- Village
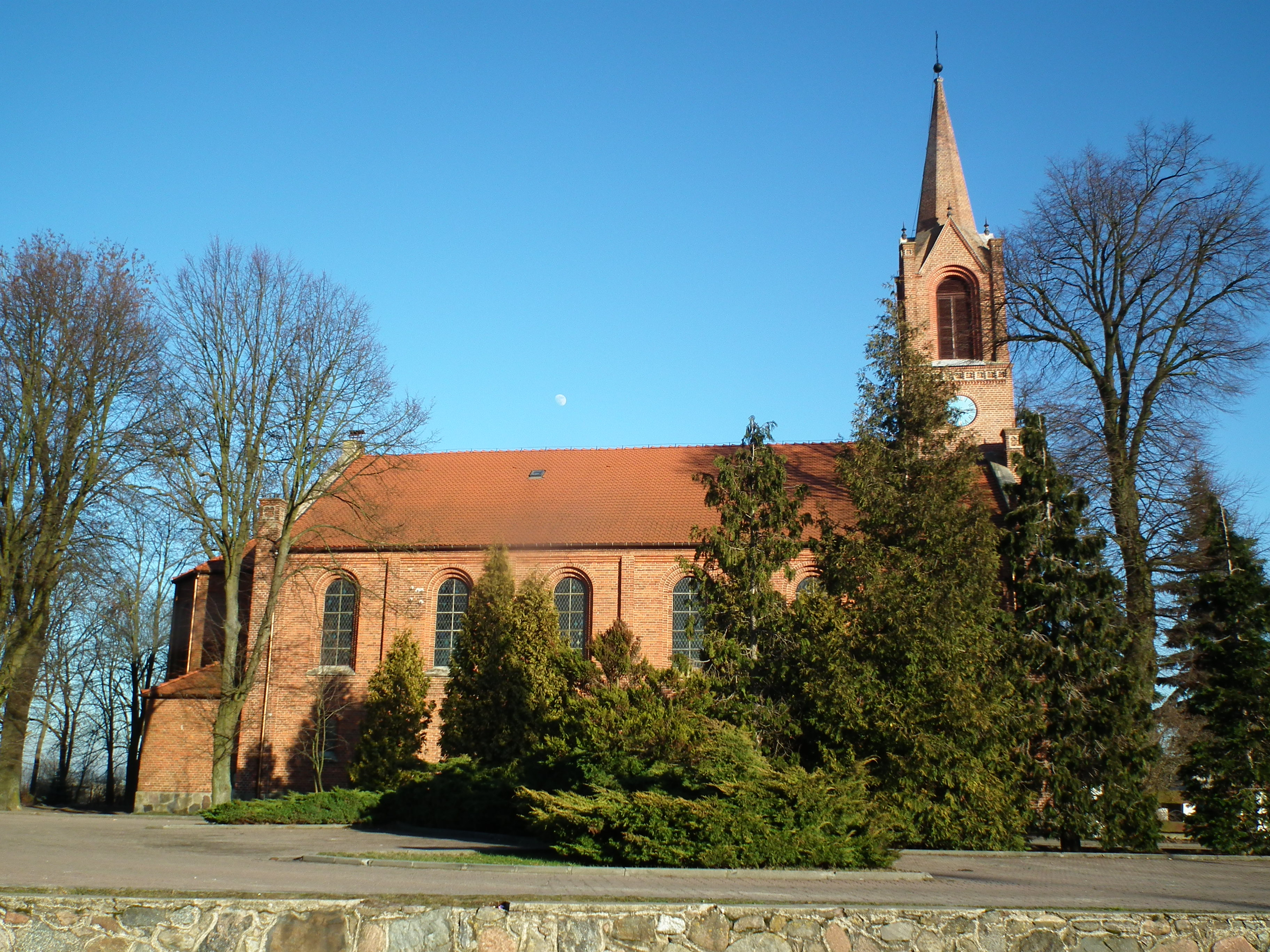
- Church of Holy Trinity

- Location within Poland
- Coordinates: 53°20′N 19°4′E
- Country: Poland
- Voivodeship: Kuyavian-Pomeranian
- County: Wąbrzeźno
- Gmina: Książki

Population
  - Total: 1,900
- Time zone: UTC+1 (CET)
  - Summer (DST): UTC+2 (CEST)
- Vehicle registration: CWA

Książki [ˈkɕɔ̃ʂki] is a village in Wąbrzeźno County, Kuyavian-Pomeranian Voivodeship, in north-central Poland. It is the seat of the gmina (administrative district) called Gmina Książki.

== History ==
In 1635, eight families from Silesia settled in Książki. However, a true beginning of the village is 24 June 1638 – the date when a charter according to the Olęder law (the Dutch law) was granted by Polish princess Anna Catherine Constance Vasa, daughter of Polish King Sigismund III Vasa, who served as the starost of Brodnica. She settled Olęder colonists there. The village became a part of the starostwo of Brodnica. Olęders were colonists from the area of the present day Netherlands, Denmark and Rhineland, who were settling in various parts of Poland since the half of the 16th century. They were reclaiming floodlands and boggy areas, as well as introducing new agricultural techniques. In the 17th and 18th century the name “Olędrzy” was associated with colonists in general, as well as with Poles with long-term lease who settled in the area of north-western Poland. Olęder planting of villages in Poland was a part of the great settlement movement in the area covering not only mentioned regions in Poland but also north coasts of present-day Germany and Denmark. Olęders, were settling willingly in the area of north-western Poland because they were granted there economic privileges: lease, rent, end of serfdom, Lutherans – freedom of worship, tithe exemption.

According to the record of church inspection which took place in 1672, there were Wielkie (Great) and Małe (Small) Książki. They were Dutch villages which were not paying tithe. Małe Książki, a Dutch village, was granted to settlers (there were 51 of them in 1738) in 1720 for 30 years. In 1744 starost of Brodnica had taken Książki Małe on perpetual lease. Starost Pleskowski prolonged the lease for 40 years in 1750. In 1773 Książki was inhabited by 56 peasant families (including 4 Catholics). There was a wooden church dating from 1720. It was surrounded by a cemetery, there was also a bell tower on a scaffolding. An evangelical school was functioning there.

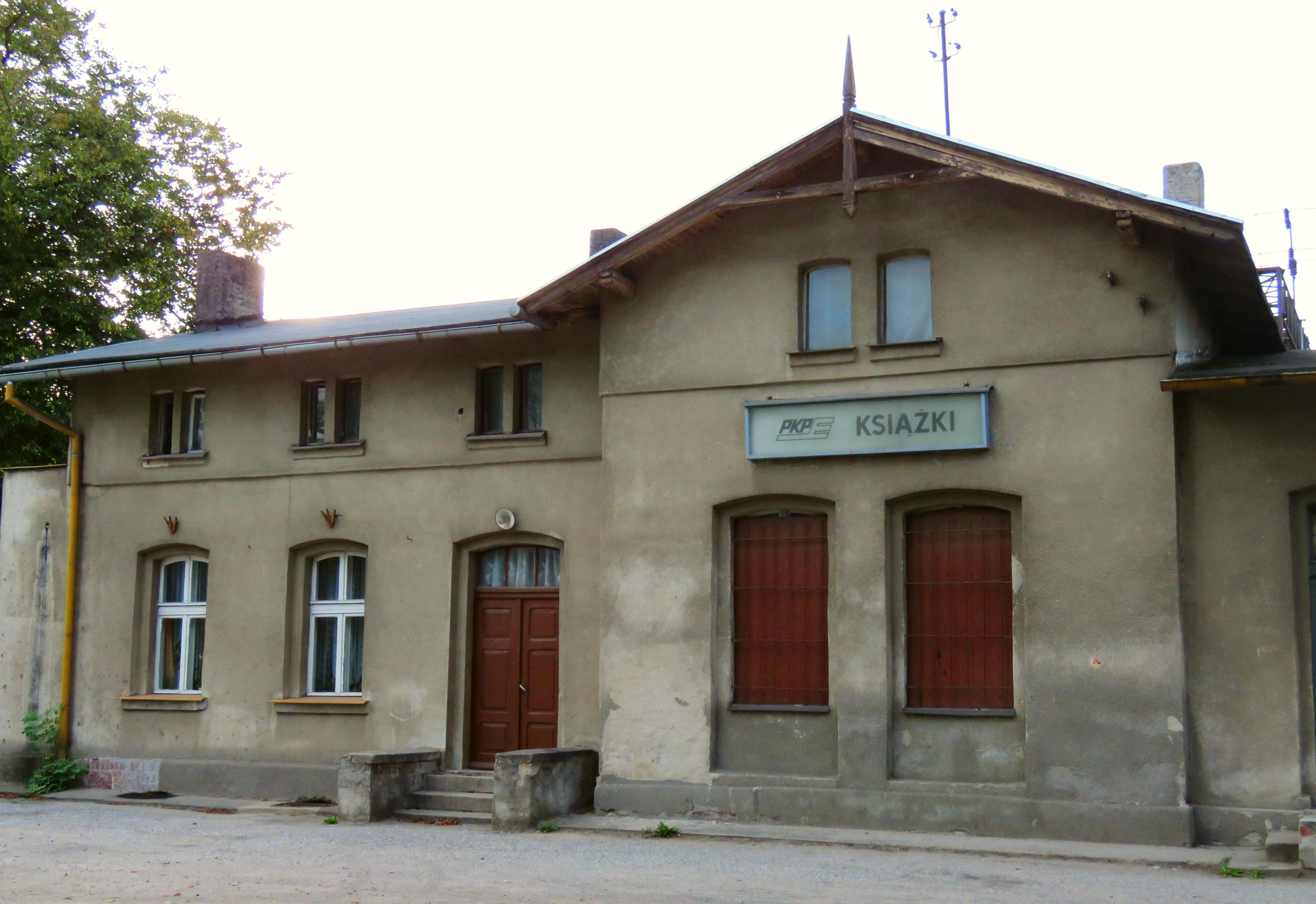
Train station

The village was annexed by Prussia in the First Partition of Poland in 1772. When in 1797 the Prussian government sold the estate, it was covering 35 włóka (1 włóka chełmińska = 17.955 ha), 20 morga (1 morga = about 1 ha), 91 pręt (1 pręt = 5.0292 m) of arable land, 3 włóka of meadows and a big peat bog. According to the record from 1797, the estate Małe Książki was obliged to: pay rent for the government cashier office in Brodnica, provide feed for cavalry, provide horses in case of the king's visit in the country, send people for wolf hunting and building fortifications and churches, transport alcohol from the brewery in Kruszyn, maintain flows and drainage ditches from the Sitnowski Canal which were crossing the area of the estate. The land was often changing its owners. In 1828 it was owned by widow Wierzbicka (her maiden name) from Trzciano. In the same year 61 peasants were granted freehold (46 włóka); they were obliged to maintain the Sitnowski Canal. In October 1831, several Polish units of the November Uprising, including cavalry and infantry, stopped in the village on the way to their internment places in the Prussian Partition of Poland. 3 plots were added to Małe Książki in 1873. They previously belonged to Niemieckie (German) Łopatki and were exchanged for 360.08 ha which was used for building the Toruń-Olsztyn railway. The estate changed its owner once again in 1877. One year later, Małe Książki was renamed as “Gut Hohenkirch”. Until 1872 the estate changed its owner twice. The name “Hohenkirch” was used till 1868. A church was being built from 24 July 1868 to 18 June 1869. In 1900 a 4-class school, and 2-class school were under construction. Baptists established in Książki a chapel in 1864. Following World War I, Poland regained independence and control of the village.

During the German occupation of Poland (World War II), Książki was one of the sites of executions of Poles, carried out by the Germans in 1939 as part of the Intelligenzaktion. Local Poles were also among the victims of the large massacres in Łopatki, perpetrated by the German police, SS and Selbstschutz in 1939, also as part of the Intelligenzaktion.

== Name ==
The name Książki is of Polish origin, however it does not stem from a book (książki literally means books in Polish). It should be rather associated with ksiądz (priest) or, more probably, with książę (Duke/Prince). It should be remembered that the charter was granted by the owner of the village, princess Anna Catherine Constance, starost of Brodnica.

When it was located, in 1638, it was mentioned as Ksionsken. According to the evangelical community of Książki record of baptisms, marriages and deaths, the name was spelled Gros Xiążken (Wielkie Książki). There was also Małe Książki (Klein Xiążken – a landed estate, after the Second World War it was a state-owned farm – Polish PGR). Following the Partitions of Poland, in the 19th century, the name Ksionsken was used until 1878. Since 26 June 1878, the German administration introduced a new name: Hohenkirch (a high church) after a church existing to the present day is finished. After the reintegration with the reborn Polish state, on 20 January 1920, the village was given the proper Polish name Książki. Under German occupation during World War II, from 6 September 1939 to 22 January 1945, Germans reintroduced and used the name Hohenkirch. Following the occupation, on 24 January 1945, the pre-war name Książki was restored.

It is an interesting detail that in 1902 a new brickyard opened by a landed estate (Małe Książki), which was functioning until 1943, was inscribing on their bricks the name “Ksionsken”. In the records of a Catholic church in Lemborg, that village is called “Xiążki”.

== Cultural heritage monuments ==
- Holy Trinity church from 1867 and a presbytery
- a primary school from the end of the 19th century
- a house at Główna Street from 1908
- the post office from the beginning of the 20th century
- a cottage from the 19th century
- Teacher's House from the beginning of the 20th century
- a monument to the Virgin Mary

== Transport ==
There is a train station in the village. There is also a bus service.
