= Gmina Ryńsk =

Gmina Ryńsk Ryńsk Commune
- Gmina
- Coat of arms
- Interactive map of Gmina Ryńsk
- Coordinates (Wąbrzeźno): 53°17′N 18°57′E
- Country: Poland
- Voivodeship: Kuyavian-Pomeranian
- County: Wąbrzeźno
- Seat: Wąbrzeźno

Area
  - Total: 200.78 km^{2} (77.52 sq mi)

Population (2006)
  - Total: 8,600
  - Density: 43/km^{2} (110/sq mi)
- Website: http://www.ugw.pl

Gmina Ryńsk is a rural gmina (administrative district) in Wąbrzeźno County, Kuyavian-Pomeranian Voivodeship, in north-central Poland. The gmina derives its name from the village of Ryńsk, but its seat is the town of Wąbrzeźno (which is not part of the territory of the gmina).

Prior to 2017 the name of the gmina was Wąbrzeźno.

The gmina covers an area of 200.78 square kilometres (77.5 sq mi), and as of 2006 its total population is 8,600.

== Village Names ==
Gmina Ryńsk contains the villages and settlements of Bugeria I, Bugeria II, Cymbark, Czystochleb, Frydrychowo, Jarantowice, Jarantowiczki, Jaworze, Katarzynki, Łabędź, Ludowice, Małe Radowiska, Michałki, Młynik, Myśliwiec, Nielub, Orzechówko, Orzechowo, Plebanka, Pływaczewo, Prochy, Przydwórz, Rozgard, Ryńsk, Sicinek, Sitno, Sosnówka, Stanisławki, Trzcianek, Trzciano, Wałycz, Wałyczyk, Węgorzyn, Wronie, Zaradowiska and Zieleń.

== Neighbouring gminas ==
Gmina Ryńsk is bordered by the town of Wąbrzeźno and by the gminas of Chełmża, Dębowa Łąka, Kowalewo Pomorskie, Książki, Płużnica and Radzyń Chełmiński.
