= Nielub =

- Village
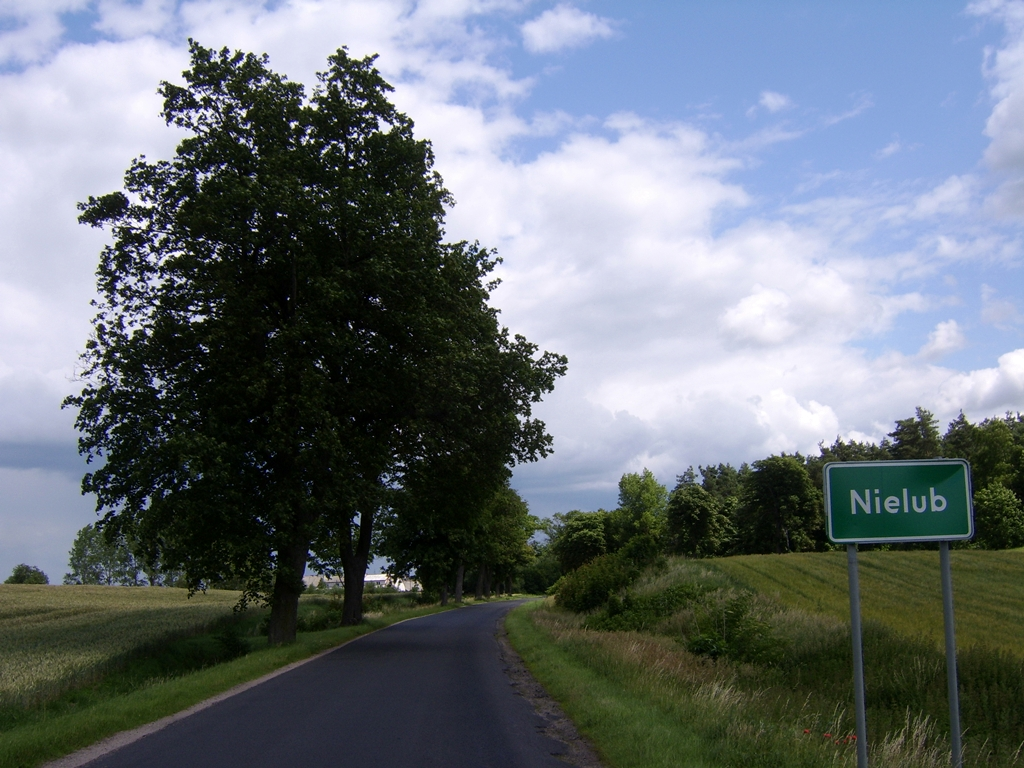

- Location within Poland
- Coordinates: 53°16′N 18°54′E
- Country: Poland
- Voivodeship: Kuyavian-Pomeranian
- County: Wąbrzeźno
- Gmina: Wąbrzeźno
- Time zone: UTC+1 (CET)
  - Summer (DST): UTC+2 (CEST)

Nielub [ˈɲɛlup] is a village in the administrative district of Gmina Wąbrzeźno, within Wąbrzeźno County, Kuyavian-Pomeranian Voivodeship, in north-central Poland.

During the occupation of Poland (World War II), on October 17, 1939, the Germans carried out a massacre of Poles from Wąbrzeźno in the village (see Nazi crimes against the Polish nation).
