= Zieleń, Kuyavian-Pomeranian Voivodeship =

Zieleń
- Village
- Location within Poland
- Coordinates: 53°13′N 18°57′E
- Country: Poland
- Voivodeship: Kuyavian-Pomeranian
- County: Wąbrzeźno
- Gmina: Wąbrzeźno

Zieleń [ˈʑɛlɛɲ] is a village in the administrative district of Gmina Wąbrzeźno, within Wąbrzeźno County, Kuyavian-Pomeranian Voivodeship, in north-central Poland.
