= Katarzynki, Kuyavian-Pomeranian Voivodeship =

Katarzynki
- Village
- Location within Poland
- Coordinates: 53°18′17″N 18°54′46″E
- Country: Poland
- Voivodeship: Kuyavian-Pomeranian
- County: Wąbrzeźno
- Gmina: Wąbrzeźno
- Population: 70

Katarzynki [kataˈʐɨnki] is a village in the administrative district of Gmina Wąbrzeźno, within Wąbrzeźno County, Kuyavian-Pomeranian Voivodeship, in north-central Poland.
