= Jaworze, Kuyavian-Pomeranian Voivodeship =

Jaworze
- Village
- Location within Poland
- Coordinates: 53°18′N 19°2′E
- Country: Poland
- Voivodeship: Kuyavian-Pomeranian
- County: Wąbrzeźno
- Gmina: Wąbrzeźno

Jaworze [jaˈvɔʐɛ] is a village in the administrative district of Gmina Wąbrzeźno, within Wąbrzeźno County, Kuyavian-Pomeranian Voivodeship, in north-central Poland.
