= Michałki, Wąbrzeźno County =

Michałki
- Village
- Location within Poland
- Coordinates: 53°16′42″N 18°50′57″E
- Country: Poland
- Voivodeship: Kuyavian-Pomeranian
- County: Wąbrzeźno
- Gmina: Wąbrzeźno
- Population: 30

Michałki (Polish pronunciation: [miˈxawkʲi]) is a village in the administrative district of Gmina Wąbrzeźno, within Wąbrzeźno County, Kuyavian-Pomeranian Voivodeship, in north-central Poland.
