= Treaty of Rinsk =

1655 alliance between Ducal and Royal Prussia

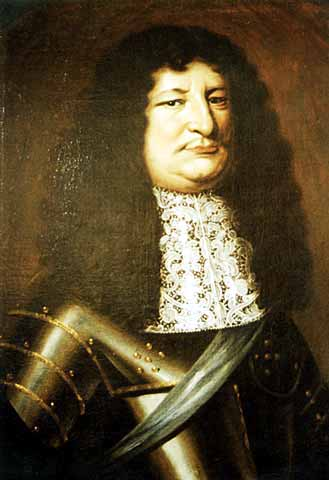
- Frederick William I, Elector of Brandenburg
- Type: Defensive alliance
- Signed: 12 November 1655
- Location: Rinsk (Ryńsk, Rynsk, Rheinsberg) near Thorn (Toruń), now part of Wąbrzeźno
- Parties: Frederick William I, Elector of Brandenburg; Royal Prussia

The treaty of Rinsk, concluded on 2 November (O.S.) / 12 November (N.S.) 1655, was a Ducal-Royal Prussian alliance during the Second Northern War. Frederick William I, Elector of Brandenburg and duke of Prussia, and the nobles of Royal Prussia agreed to allow Brandenburgian garrisons in Royal Prussia to defend it against the imminent Swedish invasion. The important towns of Danzig (Gdańsk), Thorn (Toruń) and Elbing (Elbląg) did not participate in the treaty and were not garrisoned by Brandenburgian troops, and except for Danzig surrendered to Sweden. The remainder of Royal Prussia, except for Marienburg (Malbork) was overrun by Sweden and Frederick William I's forces pursued to Königsberg (now Kaliningrad), where he was forced to accept Swedish overlordship in the Treaty of Königsberg in January 1656.

== Sources ==
=== Bibliography ===
- Frost, Robert I (2000). The Northern Wars. War, State and Society in Northeastern Europe 1558-1721. Harlow: Longman. ISBN 978-0-582-06429-4.
