= Schönfließ =

Schönfließ or Schönfliess refers to:

- Schönfließ railway station in Brandenburg, Germany
- Schönfließ, the German name of Komsomolskoye Microdistrict, Kaliningrad, Russia
- Schönfließ, the German name of Przydwórz, Poland
- Bad Schönfließ, the German name of Trzcińsko-Zdrój, Poland
