= Wronie =

- Village
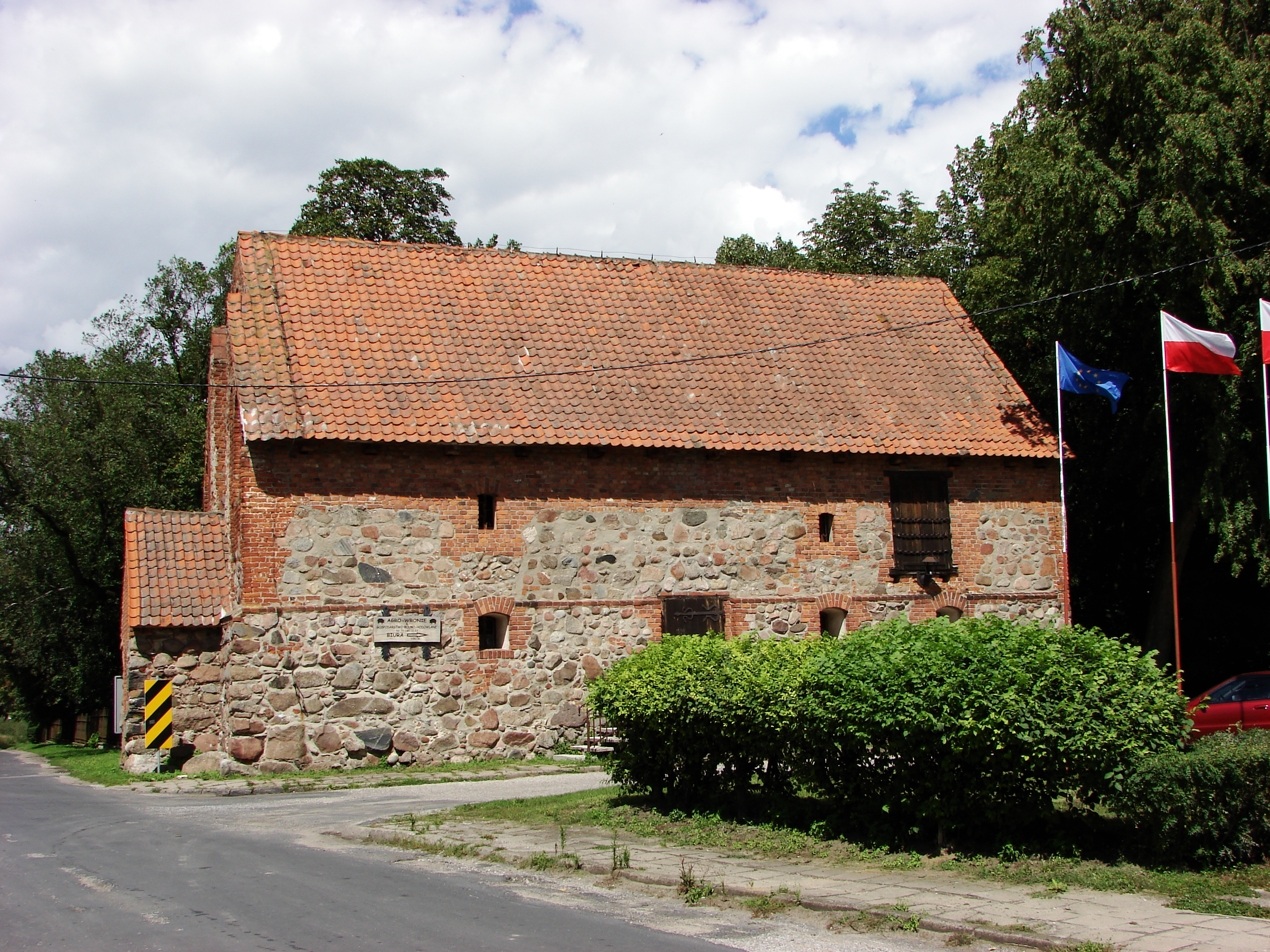
- Former church from first half of 14th century. In late 17th converted into a granary.

- Location within Poland
- Coordinates: 53°18′9″N 18°53′4″E
- Country: Poland
- Voivodeship: Kuyavian-Pomeranian
- County: Wąbrzeźno
- Gmina: Wąbrzeźno
- Population: 350

Wronie [ˈvrɔɲɛ] is a village in the administrative district of Gmina Wąbrzeźno, within Wąbrzeźno County, Kuyavian-Pomeranian Voivodeship, in north-central Poland.
