= Orzechówko, Kuyavian-Pomeranian Voivodeship =

Orzechówko
- Village
- Location within Poland
- Coordinates: 53°13′N 18°52′E
- Country: Poland
- Voivodeship: Kuyavian-Pomeranian
- County: Wąbrzeźno
- Gmina: Wąbrzeźno

Orzechówko [ɔʐɛˈxufkɔ] is a village in the administrative district of Gmina Wąbrzeźno, within Wąbrzeźno County, Kuyavian-Pomeranian Voivodeship, in central Poland.
