= Pływaczewo =

- Village
- Location within Poland
- Coordinates: 53°13′N 18°55′E
- Country: Poland
- Voivodeship: Kuyavian-Pomeranian
- County: Wąbrzeźno
- Gmina: Wąbrzeźno

Pływaczewo [pwɨvaˈt͡ʂɛvɔ] is a village in the administrative district of Gmina Wąbrzeźno, within Wąbrzeźno County, Kuyavian-Pomeranian Voivodeship, in north-central Poland.
