= Orzechowo, Kuyavian-Pomeranian Voivodeship =

Orzechowo
- Village
- Location within Poland
- Coordinates: 53°12′N 18°49′E
- Country: Poland
- Voivodeship: Kuyavian-Pomeranian
- County: Wąbrzeźno
- Gmina: Wąbrzeźno

Orzechowo [ɔʐɛˈxɔvɔ] is a village in the administrative district of Gmina Wąbrzeźno, within Wąbrzeźno County, Kuyavian-Pomeranian Voivodeship, in north-central Poland.

== Churches ==
A church in Orzechowo is dedicated to Saint Mary Magdalene.

== Notable residents ==
- Hans Baasner (1916–1983), Luftwaffe pilot
