= Bugeria II =

- Village
- Location within Poland
- Coordinates: 53°11′58″N 18°53′49″E
- Country: Poland
- Voivodeship: Kuyavian-Pomeranian
- County: Wąbrzeźno
- Gmina: Wąbrzeźno

Bugeria II is a village in the administrative district of Gmina Wąbrzeźno, within Wąbrzeźno County, Kuyavian-Pomeranian Voivodeship, in north-central Poland.
