= Nicholas von Renys =

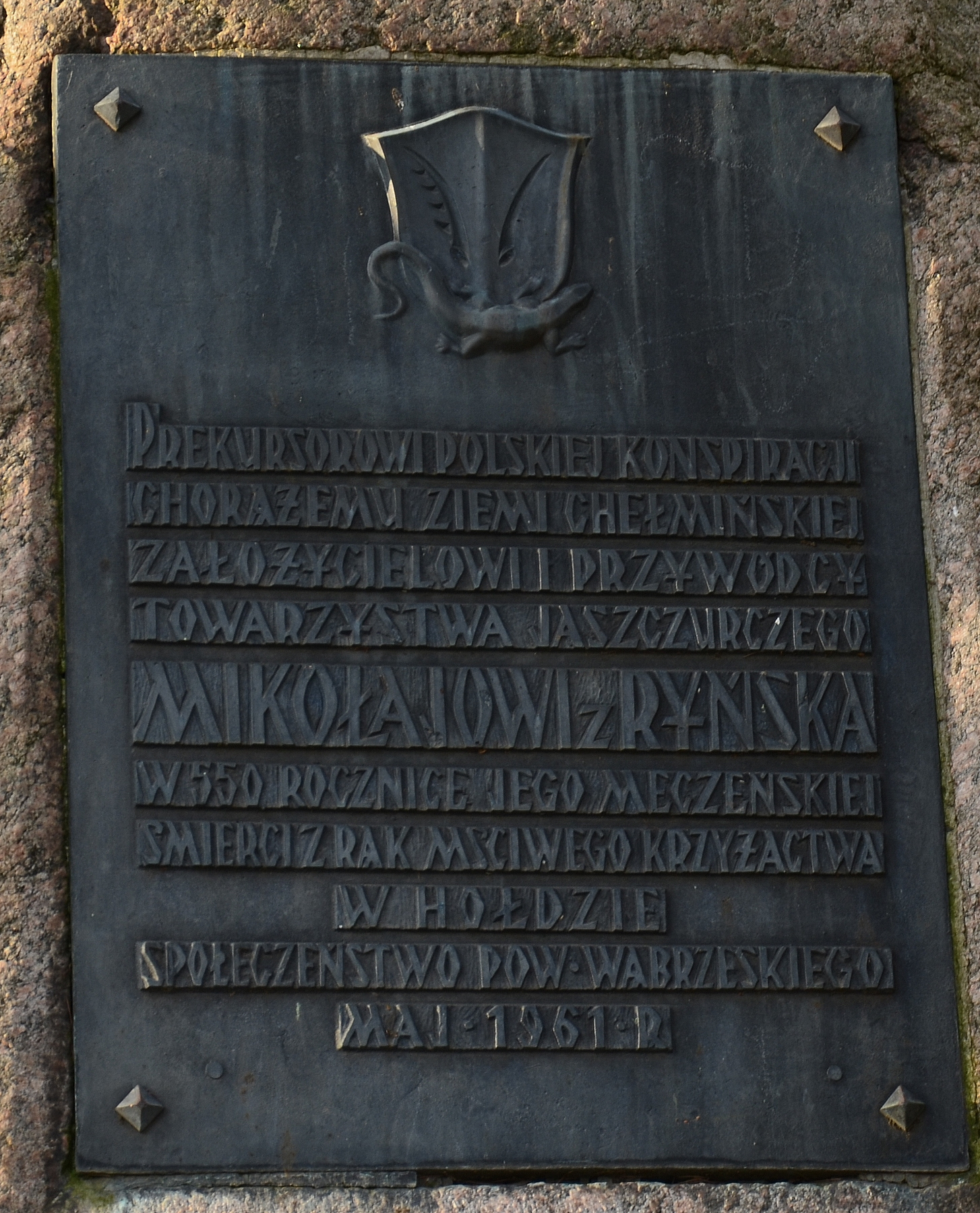
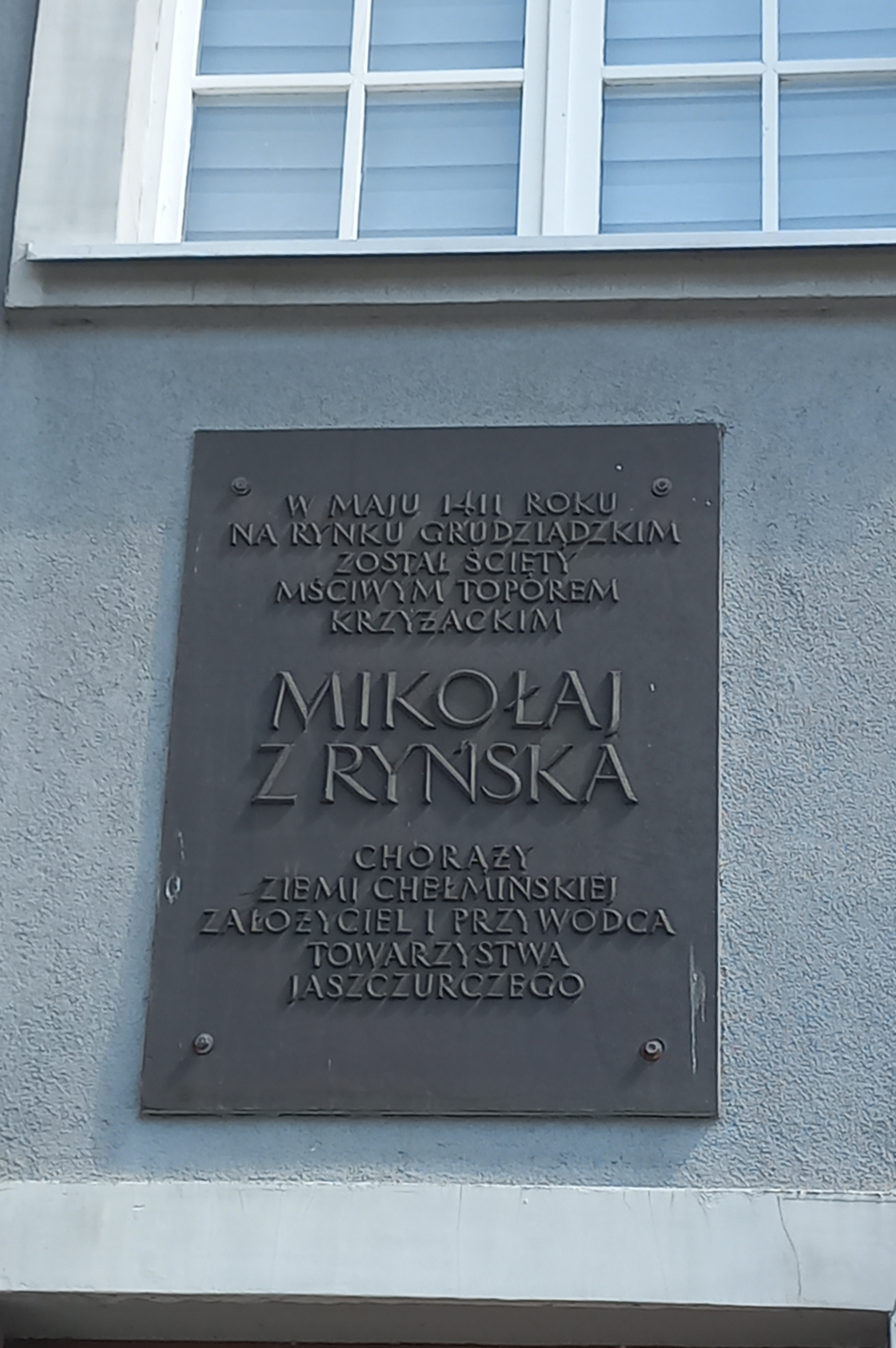
Memorial plaques in Ryńsk and Grudziądz

Nicholas von Renys (German: Nikolaus von Renys; Polish: Mikołaj z Ryńska) (1360–1411) was a secular member of the Teutonic Knights and a participant in the Polish–Lithuanian–Teutonic War (1409–1411). The Knights blamed him as a scapegoat for their defeat in the Battle of Grunwald, and he was beheaded without trial in 1411.

Nicholas von Renys was born in Ryńsk. Jan Długosz described him as a German (Nicolaus dictus Niksz, nacione Swewus) in his Banderia Prutenorum. Historian Stephen Turnbull identified him as a "secular knight of Polish descent ... of the clan Rogala", although noted Polish-American heraldic expert Leonard Suligowski doubts whether he was actually a member of the Rogala clan.

Together with his brother and cousins from the gentry of Culmerland (Chełmno Land), von Renys established the Lizard Union for mutual support against the Teutonic Knights in Kulm (Chełmno) on 24 February 1397.

During the Battle of Grunwald in 1410, von Renys carried the banner of the Culmerland troops for the Teutonic Order, described in the Latin Banderia Prutenorum. It was alleged that he was unwilling to fight against Poland due to his previous efforts for peace, that he lowered the banner, considered a signal for retreat, and contributed to the defeat of the Knights. In violation of the terms of the Peace of Thorn (1411), which prohibited persecution of traitors after the battle, the Order beheaded him in Graudenz (Grudziądz) in May 1411 and had all his male descendants killed.
