= Sicinek =

- Village
- Location within Poland
- Coordinates: 53°18′21″N 18°57′42″E
- Country: Poland
- Voivodeship: Kuyavian-Pomeranian
- County: Wąbrzeźno
- Gmina: Wąbrzeźno

Sicinek [ɕiˈt͡ɕinɛk] is a village in the administrative district of Gmina Wąbrzeźno, within Wąbrzeźno County, Kuyavian-Pomeranian Voivodeship, in north-central Poland.
