= Łabędź =

Łabędź (Polish for "swan") may refer to:

== Places ==
- Łabędź, Kuyavian-Pomeranian Voivodeship (north-central Poland)
- Łabędź, Silesian Voivodeship (south Poland)
- Łabędź, West Pomeranian Voivodeship (north-west Poland)

== Surname ==
- Bernice Labedz, (1919 – 2008), American politician
- Leopold Łabędź (1920–1993), Anglo-Polish journalist
- Piotr Łabędź, Polish Catholic Bishop of Poznań and Archbishop of Gniezno
- Ryszard Łabędź (born 1955), Polish journalist, television and radio presenter, writer, singer, musician, and entrepreneur

== See also ==
- Łabędź coat of arms
