= Młynik, Kuyavian-Pomeranian Voivodeship =

Młynik
- Village
- Location within Poland
- Coordinates: 53°14′23″N 18°56′32″E
- Country: Poland
- Voivodeship: Kuyavian-Pomeranian
- County: Wąbrzeźno
- Gmina: Wąbrzeźno

Młynik [ˈmwɨnik] is a village in the administrative district of Gmina Wąbrzeźno, within Wąbrzeźno County, Kuyavian-Pomeranian Voivodeship, in north-central Poland.
