= Plebanka, Wąbrzeźno County =

Plebanka
- Village
- Location within Poland
- Coordinates: 53°18′0″N 18°56′5″E
- Country: Poland
- Voivodeship: Kuyavian-Pomeranian
- County: Wąbrzeźno
- Gmina: Wąbrzeźno
- Population: 110

Plebanka [plɛˈbaŋka] is a village in the administrative district of Gmina Wąbrzeźno, within Wąbrzeźno County, Kuyavian-Pomeranian Voivodeship, in north-central Poland.
