= Prochy, Wąbrzeźno County =

Prochy
- Village
- Location within Poland
- Coordinates: 53°19′18″N 18°53′37″E
- Country: Poland
- Voivodeship: Kuyavian-Pomeranian
- County: Wąbrzeźno
- Gmina: Wąbrzeźno

Prochy [ˈprɔxɨ] is a village in the administrative district of Gmina Wąbrzeźno, within Wąbrzeźno County, Kuyavian-Pomeranian Voivodeship, in north-central Poland.
