= Treaty of Königsberg (1656) =

1656 treaty between Sweden and Brandenburg

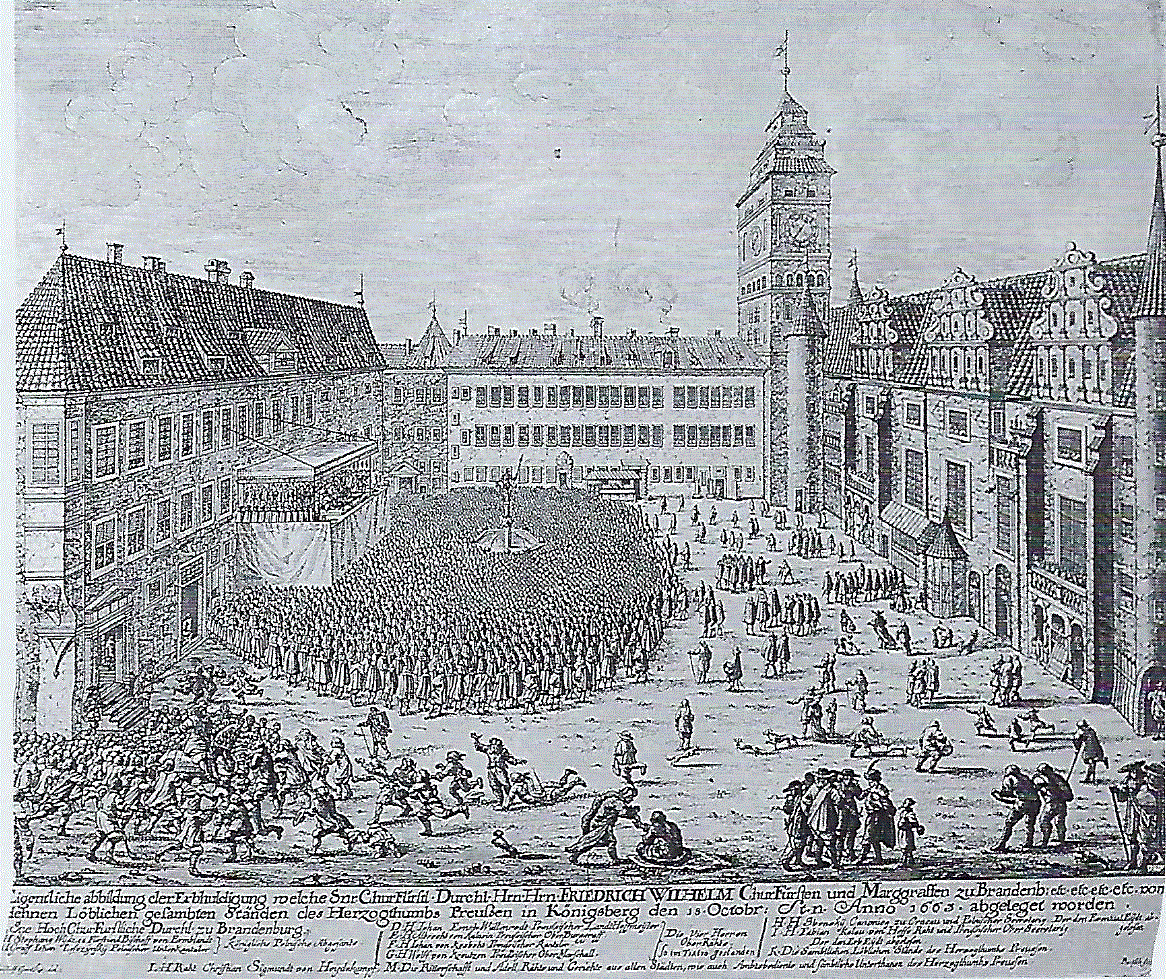
- Königsberg Castle
- Type: Legal status of the Duchy of Prussia
- Signed: 17 January 1656
- Location: Königsberg castle (now Kaliningrad)
- Signatories: Charles X Gustav; Frederick William I of Brandenburg
- Parties: Swedish Empire; House of Hohenzollern
- Language: Latin

The Treaty of Königsberg was concluded on 7 January (O.S.) / 17 January (N.S.) 1656 during the Second Northern War. Frederick William I, the "Great Elector" of Brandenburg and duke of Prussia, was forced to join the Swedish camp and became a Swedish vassal for the Duchy of Prussia and Ermland (Ermeland, Warmia). In a second treaty, negotiated on 24 February 1656 in Königsberg (Królewiec), Frederick William I concluded a defensive alliance with Louis XIV of France.

== Background ==
In 1655, the rapid progress of the Swedish campaign in Poland–Lithuania made Brandenburgian elector Frederick William I worried about his Duchy of Prussia, which he held as a Polish fief. Frederick William I, who maintained an army of 14,000 men in Brandenburg, marched his army to Prussia and in the Treaty of Rinsk of 12 November concluded a defensive alliance with the Royal Prussian nobility, who maintained an army consisting of 600 troops raised by the Prussian estates and a levy of 3,000 to 4,000 men. In addition, 3,600 troops of the regular army and mercenaries were stationed in Royal Prussia.

Charles X Gustav had meanwhile conquered nearly all of Poland and exiled the Polish king John II Casimir Vasa. From occupied Kraków, he turned northwards in October to subdue Royal Prussia, where he intended to establish a Swedish province. By December, all of Royal Prussia was occupied by Sweden except for Danzig (Gdańsk), which resisted throughout the war, and Marienburg (Malbork), which only fell in March 1656. Thorn (Toruń) and Elbing (Elbląg) had not participated in the alliance of Rinsk and surrendered to Sweden already in November. Now Charles X Gustav turned eastwards and marched his troops into Ducal Prussia, following the withdrawing army of Frederick William I. While field marshal Count Georg Friedrich von Waldeck urged the "Great Elector" to confront the Swedish forces, the latter chose not to fight and accept the Swedish terms in January.

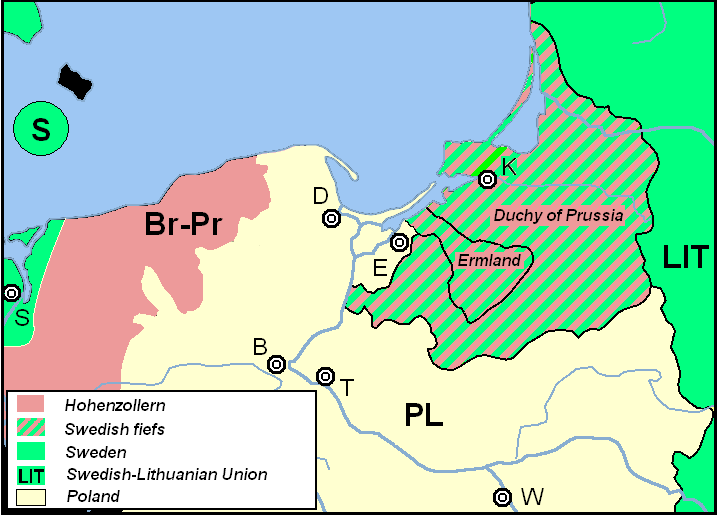
Duchy of Prussia and Ermland (Warmia) as Swedish fiefs

== Treaty between Brandenburg-Prussia and Sweden ==
Frederick William I took the Duchy of Prussia as a fief from Charles X Gustav, and had to provide him with troops. Without Swedish permission, the Electorate of Brandenburg would not maintain a navy in the Baltic Sea. In return, Frederick William I received Ermland.

In article XVII, the Lutheran Swedish king further obliged the Calvinist elector to grant religious freedom to the Lutherans in Prussia.

== Treaty between Brandenburg-Prussia and France ==
The Franco-Prussian treaty included a defensive alliance between the parties. Drafted on 24 February, it was ratified on 12 April by Louis XIV in Paris and on 24 October by Frederick William in Königsberg.

== Consequences ==
The treaty of Königsberg was followed by the Treaty of Marienburg on 25 June, when the tide of the war had turned against Sweden and Brandenburg-Prussia advanced to the position of a Swedish ally.

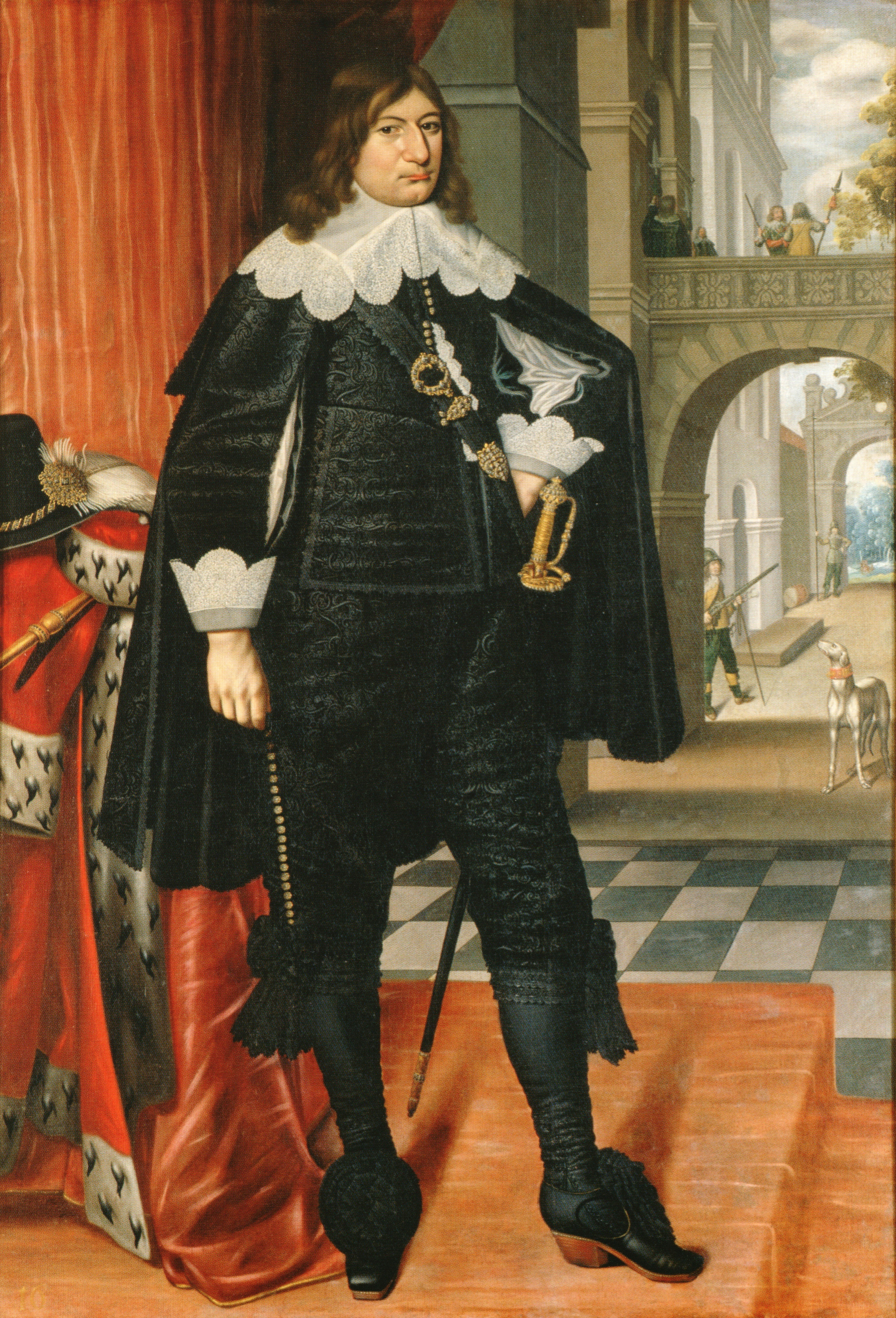
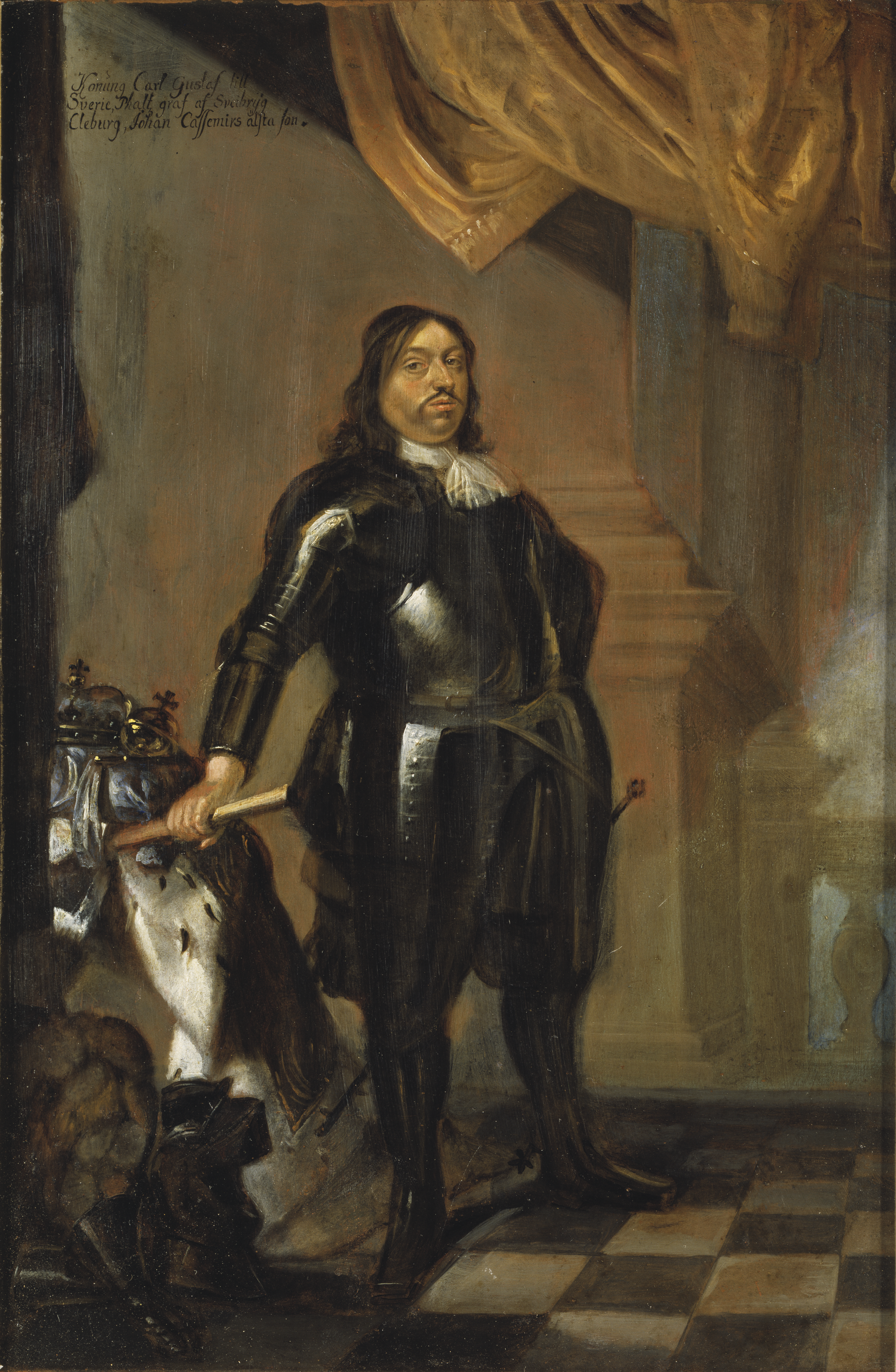
Frederick William I of Brandenburg-Prussia (left) and Charles X Gustav of Sweden (right)

Still a vassal of Charles X Gustav for Prussia, Frederick William I entered the war and the combined Swedish-Brandenburgian forces defeated the Polish army in the Battle of Warsaw in July. This made the Polish king John II Casimir Vasa, from whom Frederick William I had to take Prussia as a fief prior to Königsberg, say that once the Tartars had the Swedes for breakfast, he would arrest the elector "where neither sun nor moon will shine". In August, John II Casimir had Wincenty Korwin Gosiewski invade Prussia to "punish Frederick William for his treachery". Thirteen towns and 250 villages were burned until Gosiewski was expelled in October, and the campaign was terrifying enough to persist in local folklore until the 20th century.

Hard-pressed himself by several countries entering the war against him, Charles X Gustav in January 1656 agreed with Frederick William I on the Treaty of Labiau, which altered the terms of Königsberg in a way that the Hohenzollern electors were freed of Swedish vassalage for the Prussian duchy at the cost of Ermland and a more active participation in the war. In the subsequent treaties of Wehlau and Bromberg, John II Casimir confirmed Frederick William I's sovereignty in Prussia after the latter abandoned Sweden in the war.

== See also ==
- List of treaties

== Sources ==
=== Bibliography ===
- Evans, Malcolm (1997). Religious liberty and international law in Europe. Cambridge studies in international and comparative law. Vol. 6. Cambridge University Press. ISBN 0-521-55021-1.
- Frost, Robert I (2000). The Northern Wars. War, State and Society in Northeastern Europe 1558-1721. Harlow: Longman. ISBN 978-0-582-06429-4.
- von Moerner, Theodor, ed. (1965). Königlich Geheimes Staatsarchiv. Kurbrandenburgs Staatsverträge von 1601-1700 (in German). de Gruyter.
- Press, Volker (1991). Kriege und Krisen. Deutschland 1600-1715. Neue deutsche Geschichte (in German). Vol. 5. Munich: Beck. ISBN 3-406-30817-1.
