= Ryńsk =

- Village
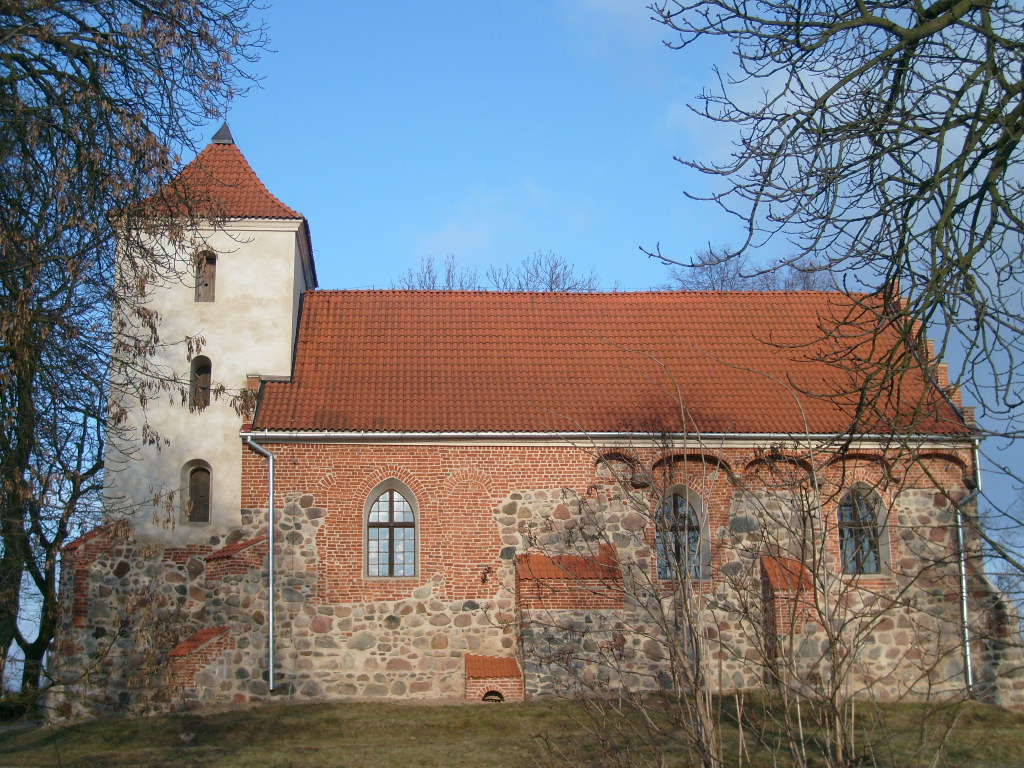
- Church of St Lawrence from first half of 14th century.

- Location within Poland
- Coordinates: 53°14′N 18°50′E
- Country: Poland
- Voivodeship: Kuyavian-Pomeranian
- County: Wąbrzeźno
- Gmina: Wąbrzeźno
- Population: 750

Ryńsk [rɨɲsk] is a village in the administrative district of Gmina Wąbrzeźno, within Wąbrzeźno County, Kuyavian-Pomeranian Voivodeship, in north-central Poland.

In 1655, it was the site of the Treaty of Rinsk, a short-lived inner-Prussian alliance during the Second Northern War.
