= Jarantowice, Wąbrzeźno County =

Jarantowice
- Village
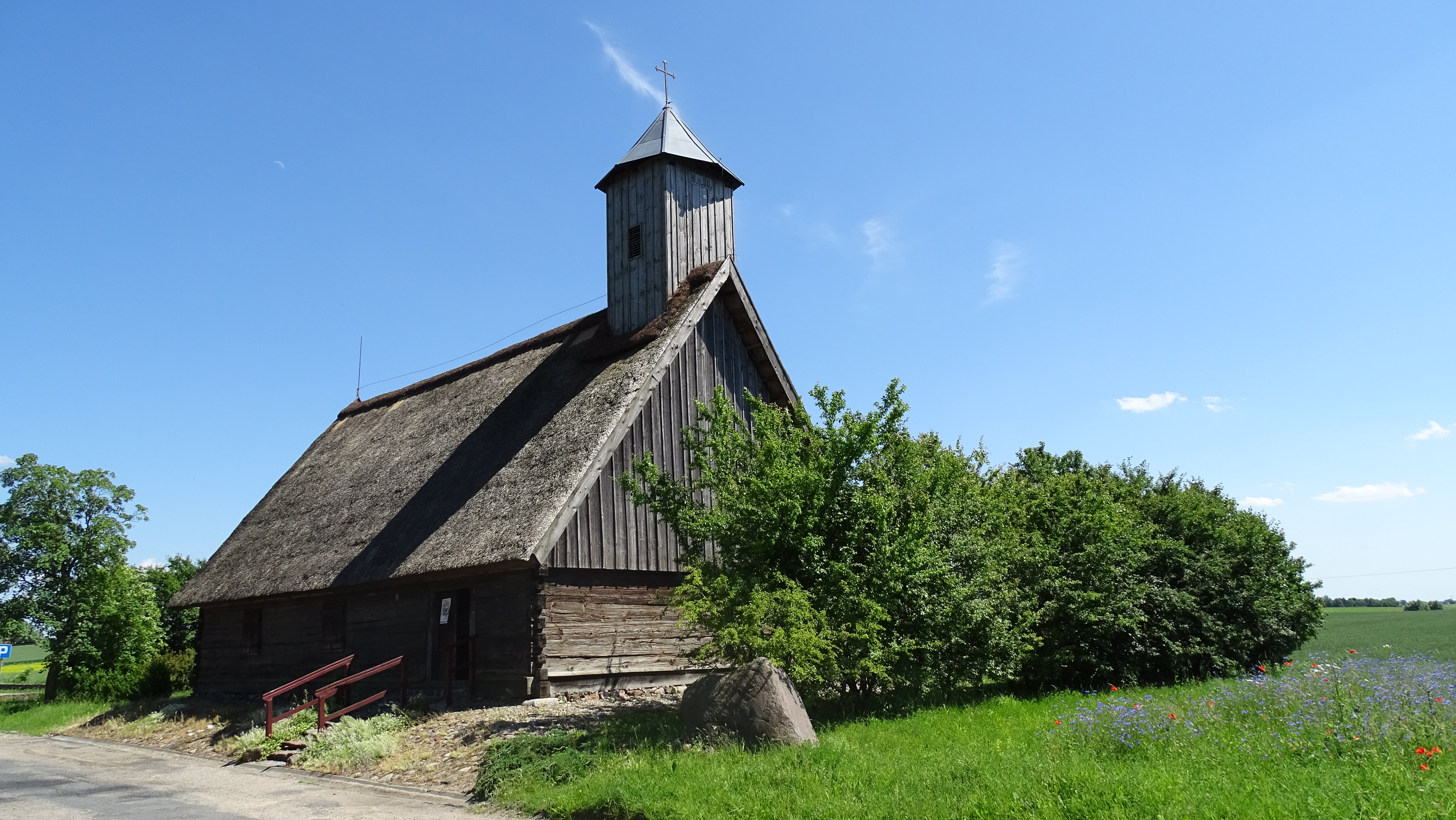

- Location within Poland
- Coordinates: 53°20′N 18°57′E
- Country: Poland
- Voivodeship: Kuyavian-Pomeranian
- County: Wąbrzeźno
- Gmina: Wąbrzeźno

Jarantowice [jarantɔˈvit͡sɛ] is a village in the administrative district of Gmina Wąbrzeźno, within Wąbrzeźno County, Kuyavian-Pomeranian Voivodeship, in north-central Poland.

== Notable residents ==
Paul Wegener (1874–1948), German actor
