= Frydrychowo, Wąbrzeźno County =

Frydrychowo
- Village
- Location within Poland
- Coordinates: 53°18′5″N 18°59′20″E
- Country: Poland
- Voivodeship: Kuyavian-Pomeranian
- County: Wąbrzeźno
- Gmina: Wąbrzeźno
- Population: 80

Frydrychowo [frɨdrɨˈxɔvɔ] is a village in the administrative district of Gmina Wąbrzeźno, within Wąbrzeźno County, Kuyavian-Pomeranian Voivodeship, in north-central Poland.
