= Treaty of Marienburg =

1656 treaty between Sweden and Brandenburg

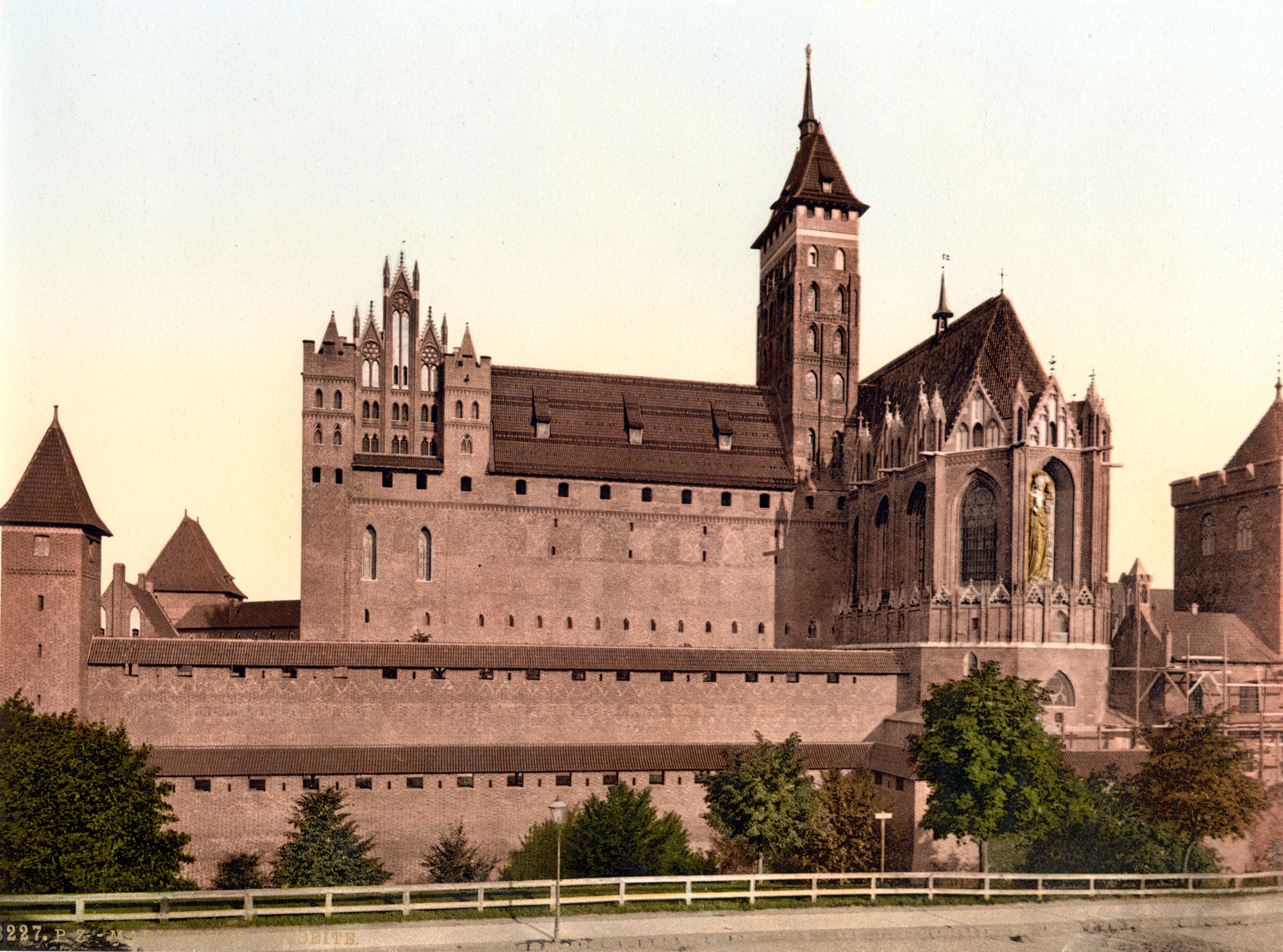
- Marienburg (Malbork) castle
- Type: Offensive alliance
- Signed: 25 June 1656
- Location: Marienburg (Malbork) castle
- Signatories: Charles X Gustav of Sweden; Frederick William I of Brandenburg
- Parties: Swedish Empire; House of Hohenzollern
- Language: Latin

The treaty of Marienburg, concluded on 25 June 1656 N.S. (15 June 1656 O.S.), was an alliance between Brandenburg-Prussia and the Swedish Empire during the Second Northern War.

By the Treaty of Königsberg of January 1656, Charles X Gustav of Sweden made Frederick William I of Brandenburg his vassal for the Duchy of Prussia. By the time of the Treaty of Marienburg, Swedish prospects in the war had diminished, and Charles X Gustav was willing to offer Frederick William a reward for fighting on his side. While the latter was to remain a Swedish vassal for Prussia, in return for participating in the Charles X Gustav's Polish campaigns, he was promised hereditary sovereignty in four voivodeships of Greater Poland:

- Poznań Voivodeship (Posen)
- Kalisz Voivodeship (Kalisch)
- Sieradz Voivodeship
- Łęczyca Voivodeship (Lancicz).

This alliance proved victorious in the subsequent Battle of Warsaw, but as further campaigns stalled, Frederick William I was to gain full sovereignty in Prussia by the Treaty of Labiau in November 1656.

== Bibliography ==
- Erdmannsdörffer, Bernhard: Friedrich Wilhelm (Kurfürst von Brandenburg), in: Allgemeine Deutsche Biographie, published by Historische Kommission bei der Bayerischen Akademie der Wissenschaften, Band 7 (1878), pp. 480–497, fulltext at de.wikisource
- Frost, Robert I (2000). The Northern Wars. War, State and Society in Northeastern Europe 1558-1721. Harlow: Longman. ISBN 978-0-582-06429-4.
- Starbäck, Carl Georg; Bäckström, Per Olof (1886). "Carl X Gustaf: Kriget i Polen 1656" [Charles X Gustav: War in Poland 1656]. Berättelser ur svenska historien (1885–1886), Sjette bandet [Stories from Swedish History (1885–1886), Volume Six] (in Swedish). Stockholm: F. & G. Beijers Förlag. p. 91.
