= Wąbrzeźno =

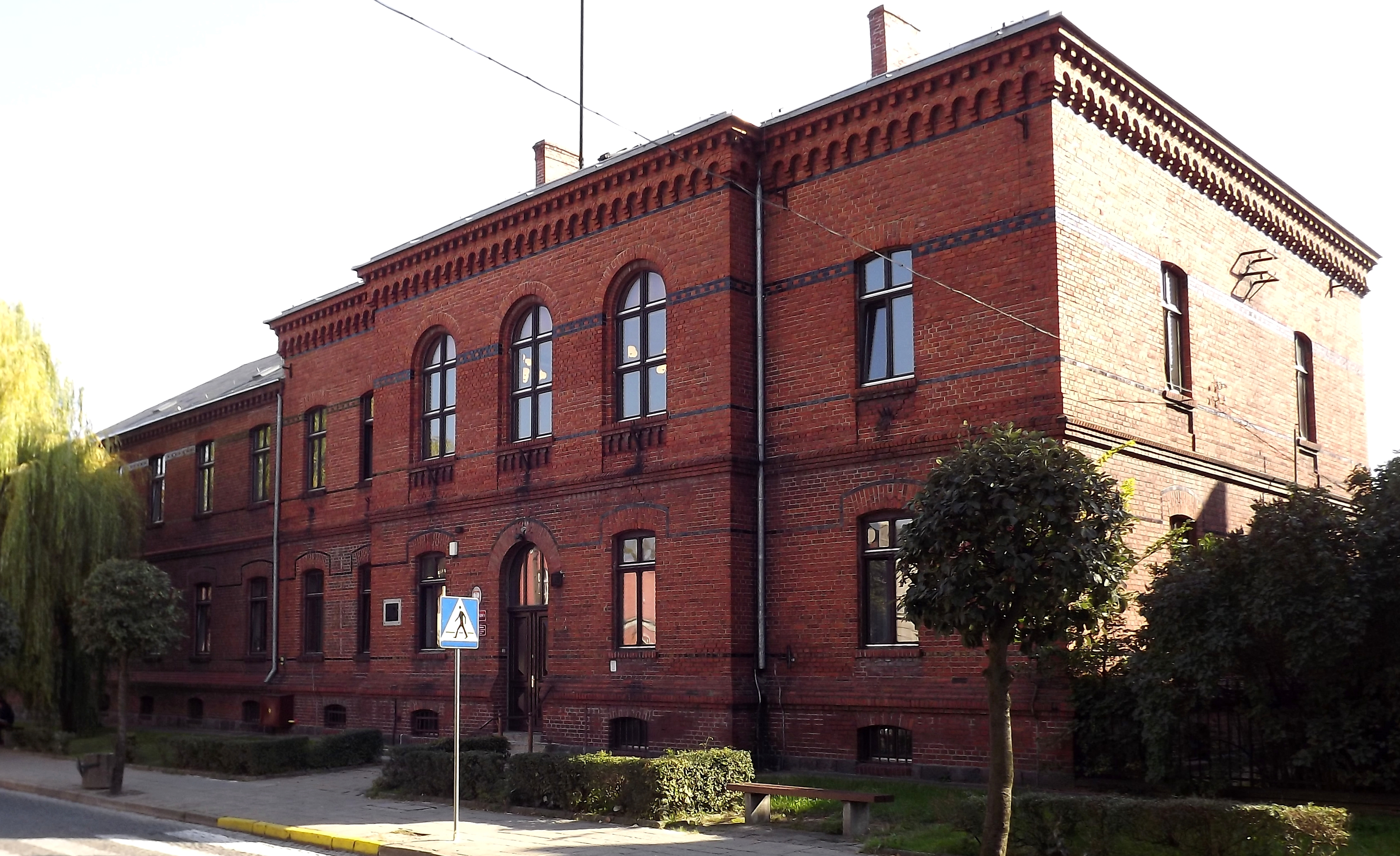
- Courthouse in Wąbrzeźno

- Flag Coat of arms

- Location within Poland
- Coordinates: 53°17′N 18°57′E
- Country: Poland
- Voivodeship: Kuyavian-Pomeranian
- County: Wąbrzeźno
- Gmina: Wąbrzeźno (urban gmina)
- Established: 13th century
- Town rights: 1331

Government
  - Mayor: Tomasz Zygnarowski

Area
  - Total: 8.53 km^{2} (3.29 sq mi)

Population (2024)
  - Total: 12 755
  - Density: 1.4/km^{2} (3.6/sq mi)
- Time zone: UTC+1 (CET)
  - Summer (DST): UTC+2 (CEST)
- Postal code: 87-200
- Area code: +48 56
- Car plates: CWA
- Website: wabrzezno.com

Wąbrzeźno (Polish pronunciation: [vɔmˈbʐɛʑnɔ]; German: Briesen) is a town in northern Poland, in the Kuyavian-Pomeranian Voivodeship, about 35 kilometres (22 miles) northeast of Toruń. It is the capital of the Wąbrzeźno County. The population is 12 755 inhabitants (2024).

== History ==
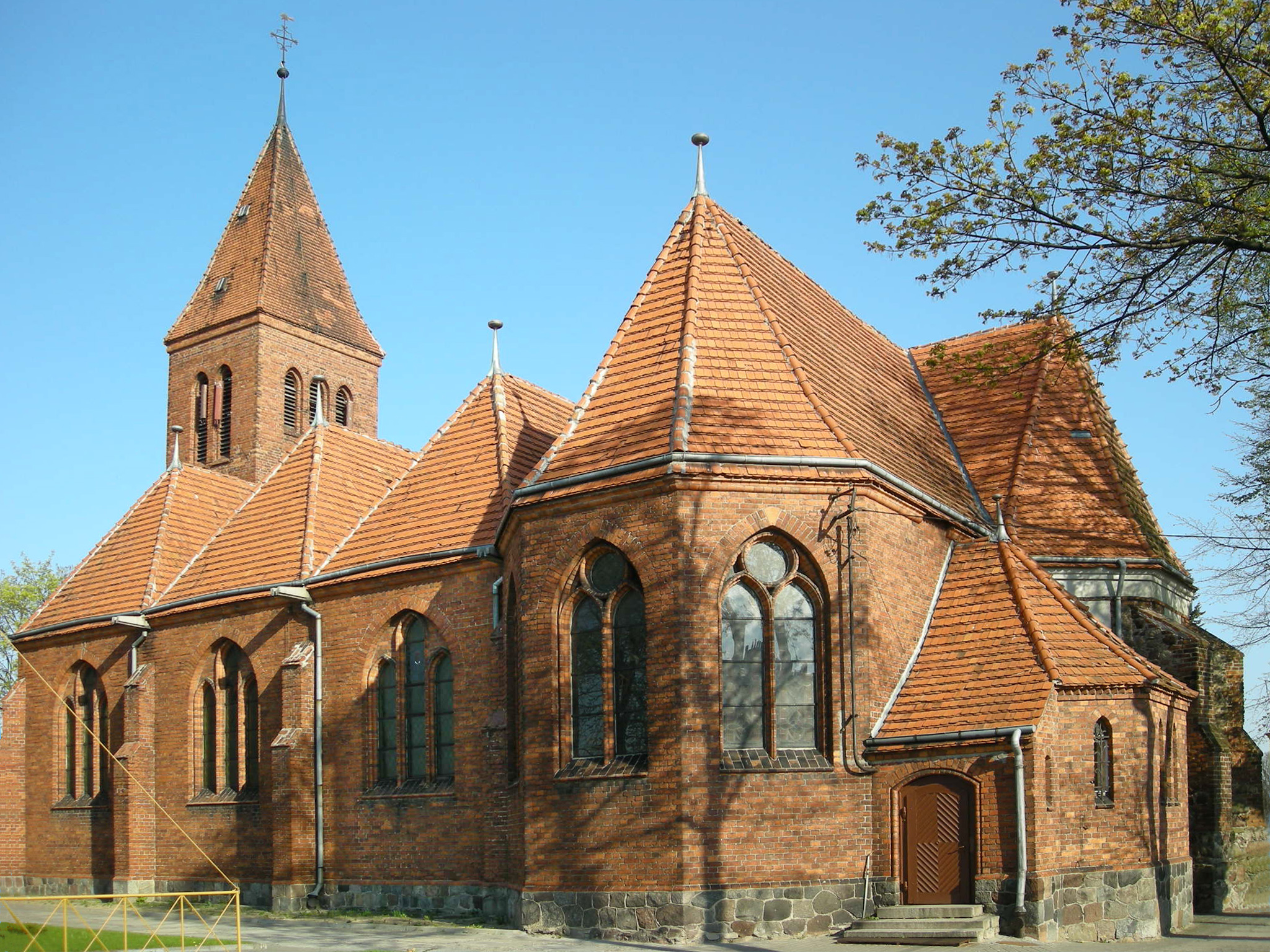
Gothic Saints Simon and Jude church

Along with Chełmno Land, the area was part of medieval Poland, since its establishment in the 10th century. Archaeologists have discovered medieval treasures, mostly from the 11th century, confirming medieval trade with the neighboring regions of Kuyavia and Prussia. At the beginning of the 13th century, a trade route developed that crossed over an isthmus between two large lakes, the Sicieńskie lake and the Zamkowe ("Castle lake"). A defensive wall was built at this spot, and later, a settlement was constructed there as well. The place is mentioned in a twelfth-century document regarding a battle in which Henry of Sandomierz was killed. Under the Latinized name "Wambresia" the town was mentioned in a 1251 document issued at Chełmża. Bishop Heidenreich of Bishopric of Chełmno received the Chełmno Land from the pope. The Polish duke Konrad I of Masovia turned possession of the settlement over to the bishop of Chełmno. This created a problem because the Teutonic Knights were in control of the Chełmno Land, and a dispute began between the Bishop of Chełmno and the Knights. The Pope at the time, Innocent IV, was not keen to continue the dispute and installed the Bishop as the rightful ruler of the settlement. This disagreement was the first historical mention of the settlement. In 1251, a large church, St. Simon and Judah, was built in the town. In the 14th century, papal verdicts ordered the restoration of the territory to Poland, however, the Teutonic Knights did not comply and continued to occupy the region.

At the beginning of the 14th century, a revitalization of the church and the town was begun, led by the then-current bishop of Chełmno, Herman von Prizna. A wall was also constructed around the town to further its protection, and a castle was constructed in the town's northwestern corner. However, the town, the wall, the surrounding villages, and the castle were all completely destroyed in the Thirteen Years' War between the Teutonic Knights and the Poles. Afterwards, all of these were reconstructed, and the castle at Wambresia served as the official residence of the Bishops until 1773.

The town joined the Prussian Confederation, which opposed Teutonic rule, and upon the request of which King Casimir IV Jagiellon reincorporated the territory to the Kingdom of Poland in 1454. On 28 May 1454 the town pledged allegiance to the Polish King in Toruń. After the end of the Thirteen Years' War, which ended with the Second Peace of Thorn (1466), the Teutonic Knights renounced claims to the town, and recognized it as part of Poland. Administratively it was located in the Chełmno Voivodeship in the province of Royal Prussia in the Greater Poland Province. Bishop of Chełmno and Polish diplomat, Jan Dantyszek, with the consent of King Sigismund I the Old, issued a new privilege to Wąbrzeźno and granted the coat of arms in 1534.

The town was plundered by the Swedes during the Polish–Swedish War in 1629, and destroyed during the Swedish invasion of Poland in 1655. Wąbrzeźno was hit by a plague epidemic in 1630 and a major portion of the town also burned down in a devastating fire in 1700.

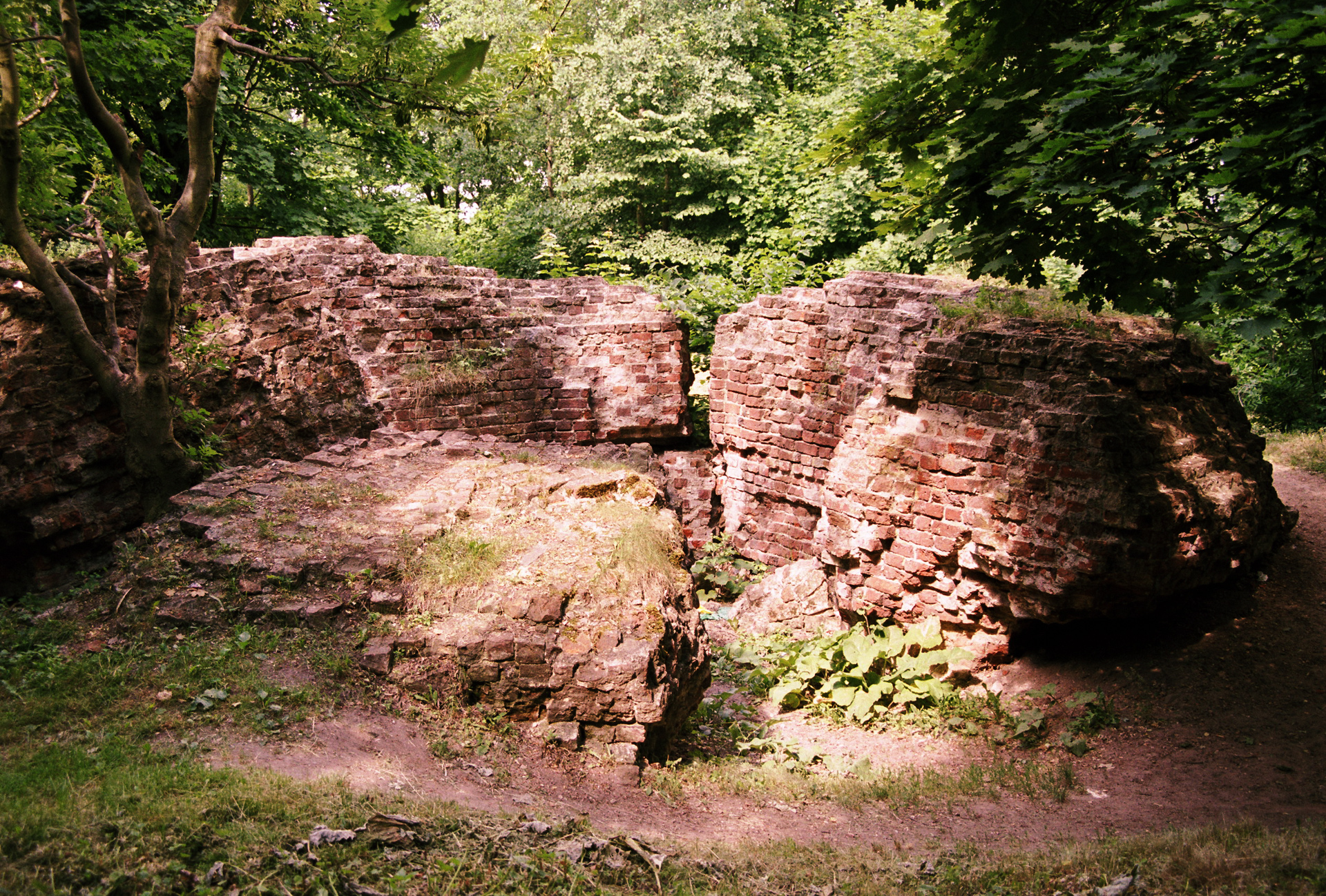
Remains of the old castle

After the First Partition of Poland in 1772, the town became a possession of the Kingdom of Prussia, and between 1807 and 1815, the town was part of the Duchy of Warsaw, before it was reannexed by Prussia. Another devastating fire destroyed much of the town in 1792, and afterwards Frederick William II of Prussia allowed the demolition of the castle to supply stones for the rebuilding of the destroyed parts of the town.

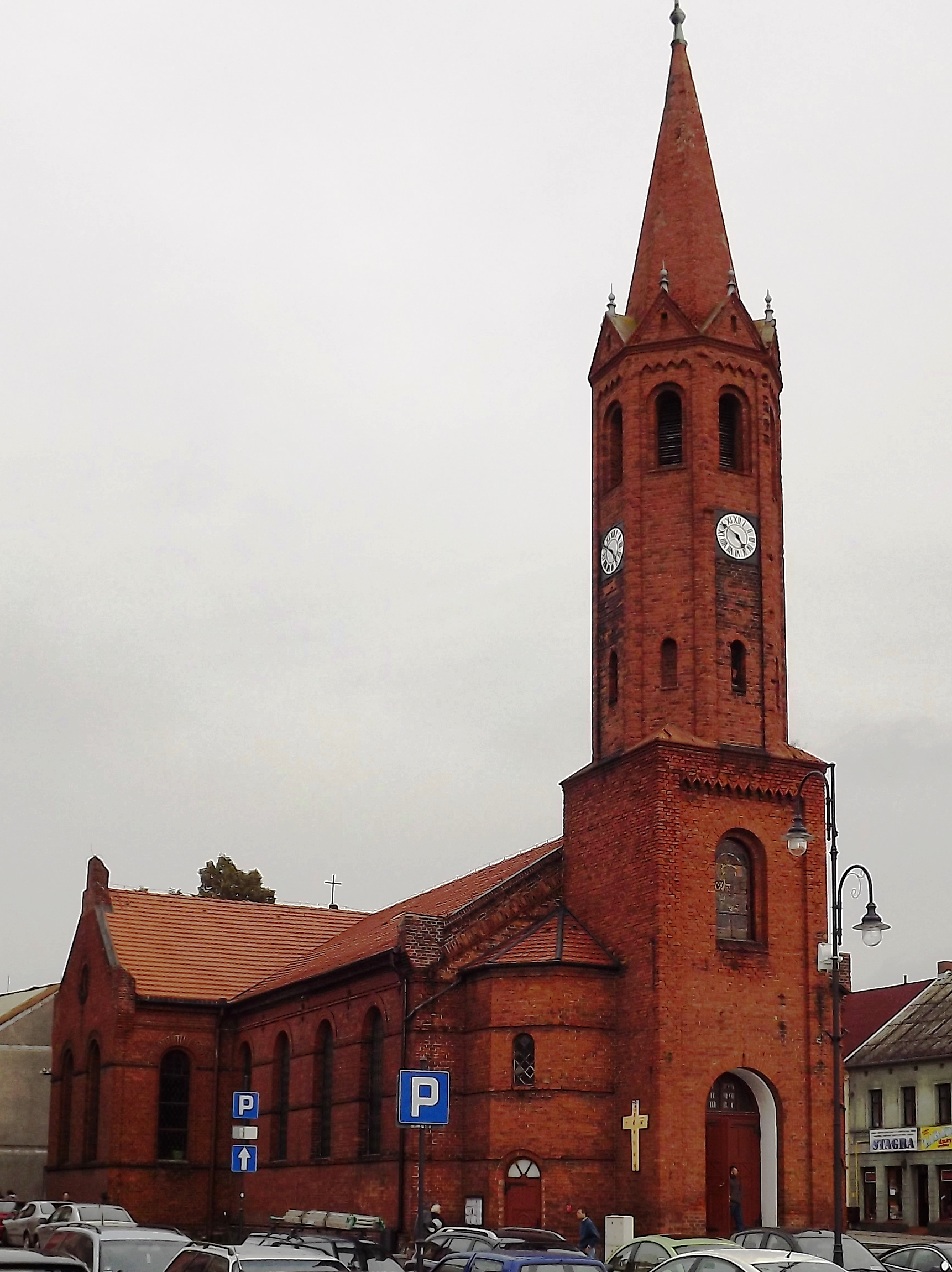
Our Lady Queen of Poland church

The town was subjected to Germanisation policies. In 1788, the town was renamed Briesen, by which is still referred to in German. The Prussian authorities initiated German colonization, by bringing German settlers to change the region's ethnic composition. Polish inhabitants took part in 19th-century Polish uprisings, including the November Uprising, Greater Poland uprising (1848) and the January Uprising. Anti-Polish policies intensified after the town became part of the German Empire in 1871. To resist Germanisation policies, Poles founded various organizations, including a branch of the "Sokół" Polish Gymnastic Society.

The residents of the town, mostly made their living through agriculture and brewing. Industrialization arrived in the middle of the 19th century. Industrial development flourished in the town due to its location and its access to railroads. By 1900, the town contained cement factories, as well as automotive and mechanical engineering centers. Along with this the traditional industries of the town were also modernized, with state-of-the-art breweries and creameries taking shape.

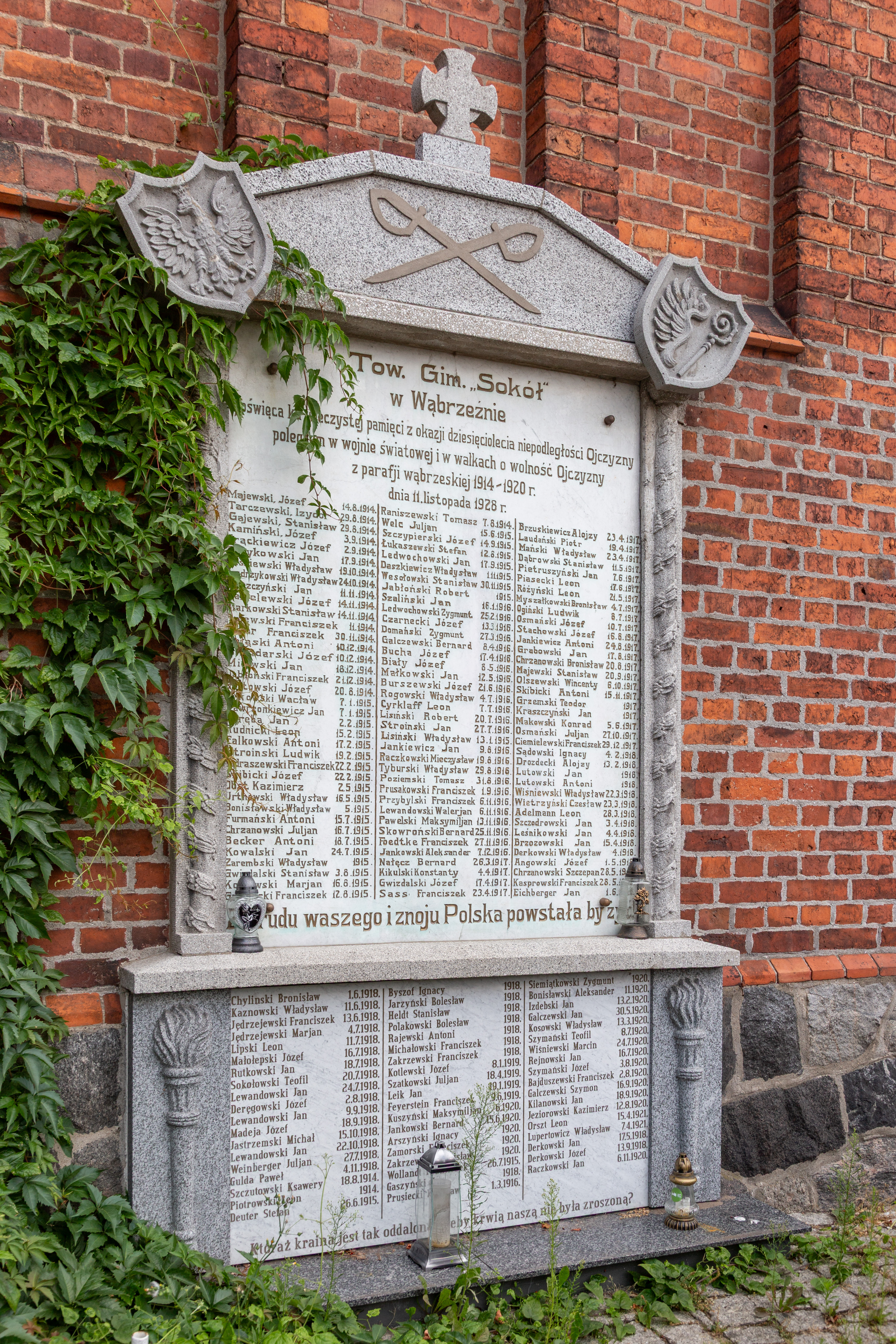
Memorial to local Poles killed in the wars of 1914–1920

On January 20, 1920, the town was reintegrated with Poland, which regained independence, the historic Polish name was restored, and was made seat of its county. Polish cultural life was revived in the interbellum.

Wąbrzeźno was invaded by Nazi Germany in September 1939, during World War II, and was occupied by Germany until 1945. The Germans carried out mass arrests of Poles in October 1939. Around 1,000 Poles were arrested and imprisoned, mostly in a temporary concentration camp, established in a local factory, but some also in the local prison. Some of these Poles were murdered in Skrwilno between October 15 and November 15, 1939, and in Nielub on October 17, 1939, while most were murdered in large massacres in Łopatki and Kurkocin (see Intelligenzaktion). Nearly 4,000 Polish residents of Wąbrzeźno and the surrounding communities were sent to Nazi concentration camps, established in Potulice and Toruń, and expelled. The Germans banned the use of the Polish language, liquidated Polish schools and organizations, and resettled the town with German colonists, however, the Poles still organized the underground Polish resistance movement.

The Red Army captured the town in January 1945, but this was hardly an improvement, as the Soviets conducted mass deportations, in which 776 people from the county, including 261 people from the town were deported to labor camps in the Soviet Union. Most of these deportees died while being transported or in the labor camps, and most were Polish citizens.

The town lost its status as county seat in 1975, but regained in 1999.

== Demographics ==
Historical population

Year	Pop.	±%
1772	502	—
1900	6,071	+1109.4%
1921	7,118	+17.2%
1931	8,591	+20.7%
1939	9,551	+11.2%
1950	8,840	−7.4%

Year	Pop.	±%
1960	11,017	+24.6%
1988	12,396	+12.5%
1998	14,283	+15.2%
2003	14,523	+1.7%
2010	13,877	−4.4%

== Culture ==
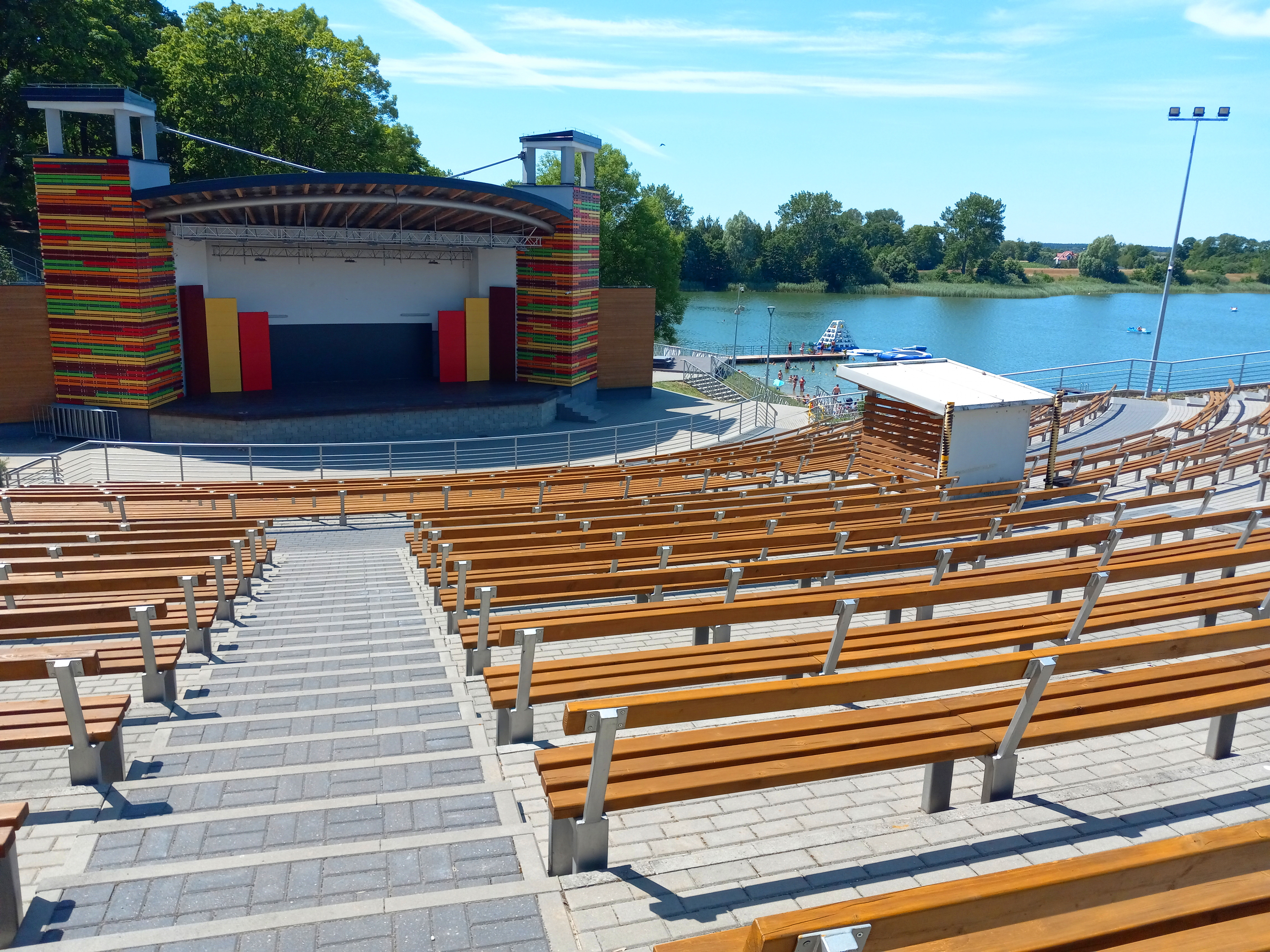
Amphitheatre in Wąbrzeźno

There is a Municipal Museum in Wąbrzeźno (Muzeum Miejskie w Wąbrzeźnie).

== Notable people ==
- Bernard of Wąbrzeźno (1575–1603), Polish Roman Catholic priest and a Benedictine monk
- Ludwig von Erlichshausen (1410–1467), Grand Master of the Teutonic Knights
- Maciej Freimut (born 1967), canoeist, Olympic medallist
- Magdalena Fularczyk (born 1986), rower, Olympic gold medallist
- Gisela Hahn (born 1943), German film actress
- Roy Henkel (1905–1981), German-Canadian ice hockey player
- Grzegorz Knapp (1979–2014), speedway rider
- Karolina Kudłacz-Gloc (born 1985), handball player
- Walther Nernst (1864–1941), chemist, Nobel Prize winner for the Nernst equation
- Franciszek Nogalski (1911–1939), Roman Catholic priest
- Tadeusz Nowicki (born 1958), industrialist
- Paul Zech (1881–1946), poet
