= Wąbrzeźno County =

Wąbrzeźno County Powiat wąbrzeski
- County
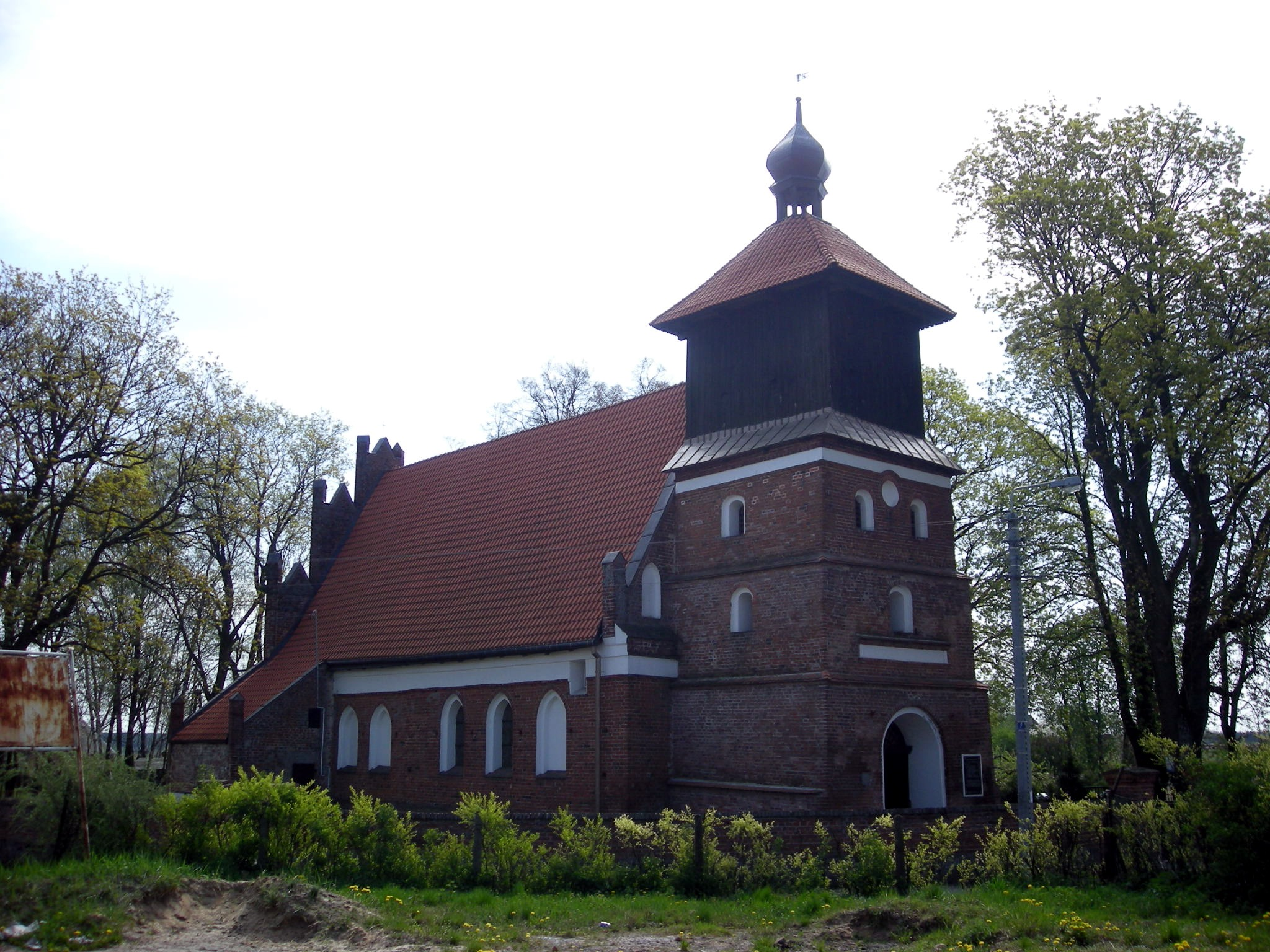

- Flag Coat of arms

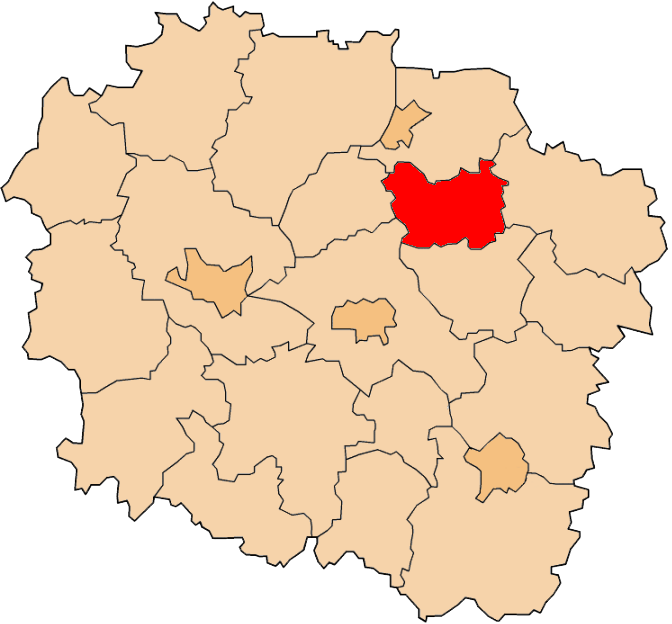
- Location within the voivodeship

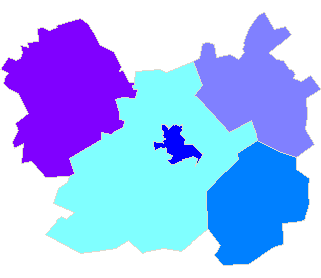
- Division into gminas
- Coordinates (Wąbrzeźno): 53°17′N 18°57′E
- Country: Poland
- Voivodeship: Kuyavian-Pomeranian
- Seat: Wąbrzeźno
- Gminas: Total 5 (incl. 1 urban): Wąbrzeźno; Gmina Dębowa Łąka; Gmina Książki; Gmina Płużnica; Gmina Wąbrzeźno

Area
  - Total: 501.31 km^{2} (193.56 sq mi)

Population (2019)
  - Total: 34,297
  - Density: 68.415/km^{2} (177.19/sq mi)
  - Urban: 13,570
  - Rural: 20,727
- Car plates: CWA
- Website: www.wabrzezno.pl

Wąbrzeźno County (Polish: powiat wąbrzeski) is a unit of territorial administration and local government (powiat) in Kuyavian-Pomeranian Voivodeship, north-central Poland. It came into being on January 1, 1999, as a result of the Polish local government reforms passed in 1998. Its administrative seat and only town is Wąbrzeźno, which lies 36 km (22 mi) north-east of Toruń and 66 km (41 mi) east of Bydgoszcz.

The county covers an area of 501.31 square kilometres (193.6 sq mi). As of 2019 its total population is 34,297, out of which the population of Wąbrzeźno is 13,570 and the rural population is 20,727.

== Neighbouring counties ==
Wąbrzeźno County is bordered by Grudziądz County to the north, Brodnica County to the east, Golub-Dobrzyń County to the south, Toruń County to the south-west, and Chełmno County to the west.

== Administrative divisions ==
The county is subdivided into five gminas (one urban and four rural). These are listed in the following table, in descending order of population.

Gmina	Type	Area (km^{2})	Population (2019)	Seat
Wąbrzeźno	urban	8.5	13,570	
Gmina Ryńsk	rural	200.8	8,569	Wąbrzeźno *
Gmina Płużnica	rural	119.3	4,811	Płużnica
Gmina Książki	rural	86.5	4,163	Książki
Gmina Dębowa Łąka	rural	86.1	3,184	Dębowa Łąka
* seat not part of the gmina
