= Ludwik Rydygier Collegium Medicum in Bydgoszcz =

University of medicine in Bydgoszcz, Poland

Coordinates: 53°07′26″N 18°00′28″E

- Collegium Medicum im. Ludwika Rydygiera w Bydgoszczy Uniwersytetu Mikołaja Kopernika w Toruniu
- Latin: Universitas Copernicana Thoruniensis Collegium Medicum
- Type: Public Medical University
- Established: 1984
- Parent institution: Nicolaus Copernicus University in Toruń
- Director: Prof. Dr. hab. Dariusz Grzanka
- Location: Bydgoszcz, Kuyavian-Pomeranian Voivodeship, Poland
- Language: Polish, English
- Website: www.cm.umk.pl

The Ludwik Rydygier Collegium Medicum in Bydgoszcz is the medical school of the Nicolaus Copernicus University in Toruń. It was established in 2004 through the merger of Medical Academy in Bydgoszcz (founded in 1984) and Nicolaus Copernicus University. It is named after Ludwik Rydygier, who in 1880 performed the world’s first successful pylorus resection for gastric cancer in Chełmno, marking a milestone in the development of abdominal surgery.

== Faculties ==
It comprises three faculties:

- Faculty of Medicine
- Faculty of Pharmacy
- Faculty of Health Sciences

== Network ==
Clinical training and research are supported by a regional hospital network, including the Antoni Jurasz University Hospital, the Biziel University Hospital, the Franciszek Łukaszczyk Oncology Center in Fordon, the Kujawsko-Pomorskie Pulmonology Center, and the Sanatorium in Smukała, as well as institutions in Toruń such as the Ludwik Rydygier Provincial Specialist Hospital (Wojewódzki Szpital Zespolony im. L. Rydygiera w Toruniu) and the Regional Children’s Hospital.

UMK, and by extension the Collegium Medicum, is a member of the Young European Research Universities Network (YERUN), which also includes the University of Ulm, Paris Dauphine University, Sorbonne Nouvelle University, Maastricht University, and the University of Antwerp.

== Rankings ==
Nicolaus Copernicus University (NCU) in Toruń, including its Collegium Medicum in Bydgoszcz, is consistently ranked among the top medical and academic institutions in Poland:

In the Uniranks 2025 ranking, NCU is placed 6th nationally.

In the Academic Ranking of World Universities (Shanghai Ranking 2025), NCU is positioned 5th nationally among Polish universities.

The Collegium Medicum of NCU in Bydgoszcz achieved 1st place in the Spring 2023 edition of the National Medical Final Examination (LEK), both in the overall ranking and in the category of first-time examinees.

CM UMK students regularly achieve podium positions in the Golden Scapula competition. In 2023, they secured 1st and 2nd place in the English Division individual category and 1st place in the English Division team category.

In 2025, the Collegium Medicum team won 1st place among 14 universities in the national Medical Simulation Contest SimChallenge.

== Characteristics ==
The Collegium Medicum is a separate branch of the "Nicolaus Copernicus University" in Toruń located in Bydgoszcz: with three faculties it provides education in eleven departments with several specialties within these departments. Two University Hospitals of Bydgoszcz are associated with the Collegium Medicum:

- No. 1-Dr. Antoni Jurasz;
- No. 2-Dr. Jan Biziel.

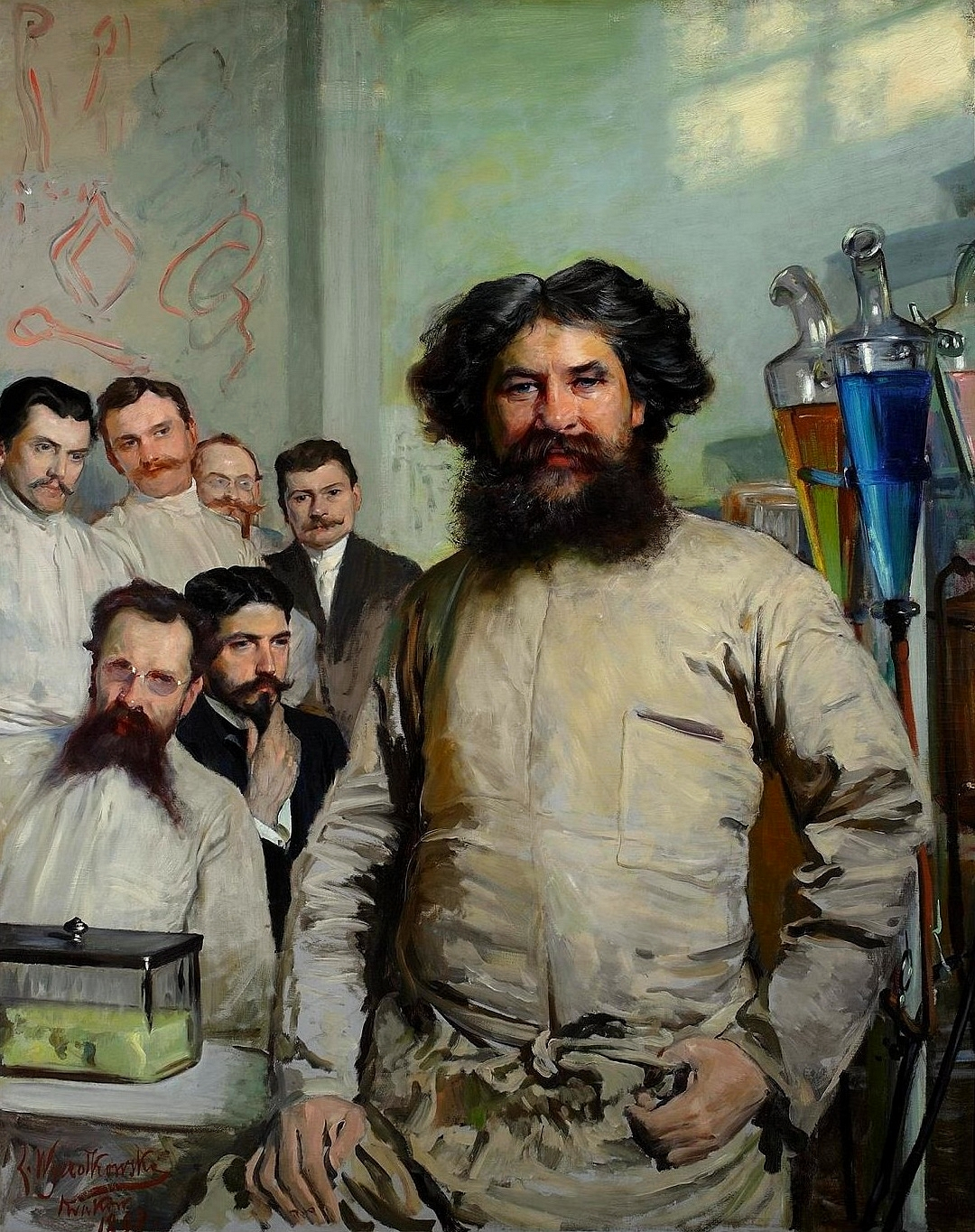
Ludwik Rydygier with his assistants by Leon Wyczółkowski

Furthermore, the institution operates other centers in the city:

- the Oncology Center-Prof. Franciszek Łukaszczyk;
- the Hospice-Blessed Father Jerzy Popiełuszko;
- the Kujawsko-Pomorskie Pulmonology Center;
- the Hospital for Infectious Diseases-Tadeusz Browicz in Świętego Floriana Street.

and also facilities in Toruń:

- the provincial Hospital-Ludwik Rydygier;
- the provincial Children's Hospital.

Additionally, the university conducts teaching activities at the 10th Military Hospital in Bydgoszcz.

The Collegium Medicum manages two university dormitories: one downtown, at 13 Jagiellońska street and one in the eastern district of Fordon at Bartłomieja z Bydgoszczy street.

The instruction is organized according to the three stages of the European Higher Education Area (EHEA):

- undergraduate studies (Polish: Studia pierwszego stopnia);
- MA degree studies (Polish: Studia drugiego stopnia);
- doctorate studies-Faculty of Medicine/Faculty of Health Sciences (Polish: Studia trzeciego stopnia);
- There are also opportunities to conduct postgraduate studies.

In 2020/2021, 4870 students study at the Collegium Medicum, including 551 doctorates and more than 300 foreigners (mainly from Norway, Ireland and India). The same academic year, 857 teachers were employed at the Collegium Medicum, comprising 188 professors or habilitated doctors and 5 assistant professors. The university employees in Bydgoszcz represent nearly a third of the overall UMK personnel and a third of the UMK students are working in Bydgoszcz.

In addition to a large spectrum of activities (teaching, education, research and development), the medical university conducts highly specialized therapeutic tasks for the entire Voivodeship.

Collegium Medicum takes part in many international research and teaching programs, organizing national and international academic conferences. Regular scientific contacts are exchanged with other centers in Germany (Wuppertal, Berlin, Kiel), Switzerland (Aarau), Netherlands (Amsterdam), France (Paris), Sweden (Lund), Norway (Sandvik), Belgium (Antwerp, Liège) and United States (Houston).

The university also conducts operations for the local community, such as the medical science festival "Medicalia" organized periodically at the end of the year in Bydgoszcz.

In 1991, the UMK-Collegium Medicum was registered into the World Health Organization database.

== History ==
=== Origins ===
The origin of Bydgoszcz Medical Academy, present day UMK-Collegium Medicum, dates back to 1951, when the "Institution for Training of Physicians" (Polish: Zakład Szkolenia Lekarzy) was established at then-Voivodeship Hospital in Bydgoszcz (the contemporary Antoni Jurasz University Hospital No. 1).

=== As a branch of Warsaw academic institutions ===
When the Institute for Continuing Education and Specialist Training of Physicians (Polish: Instytut Doskonalenia i Specjalizacji Kadr Lekarskich — the contemporary Centre for Medical Postgraduate Education, Polish: Centrum Medycznego Kształcenia Podyplomowego) was established in Warsaw in 1953, the Institution for Training of Physicians in Bydgoszcz became a part of it, resulting in nine of clinical and diagnostic units of the new institute being located in hospitals of Bydgoszcz. During 4 years (1953–1957), the local branch of the Institute was chaired by prof. Jan Szymański, his successor was prof. Jan Małecki. In 1959, the Institute was transformed into a "Medical Training Center" and incorporated in the Medical University of Warsaw. At that time, the 2nd clinic of otorhinolaryngology was established in Bydgoszcz and the postgraduate training of doctors in other medical disciplines was entrusted to the heads of hospital departments. A year later, the Voivodeship National Council in Bydgoszcz adopted a resolution to establish a Medical University in Bydgoszcz, using the basis of the "Physician Improvement Study Department". This decision was reached with the consent of the representatives of the "Nicolaus Copernicus University in Toruń" and the minister of higher education.

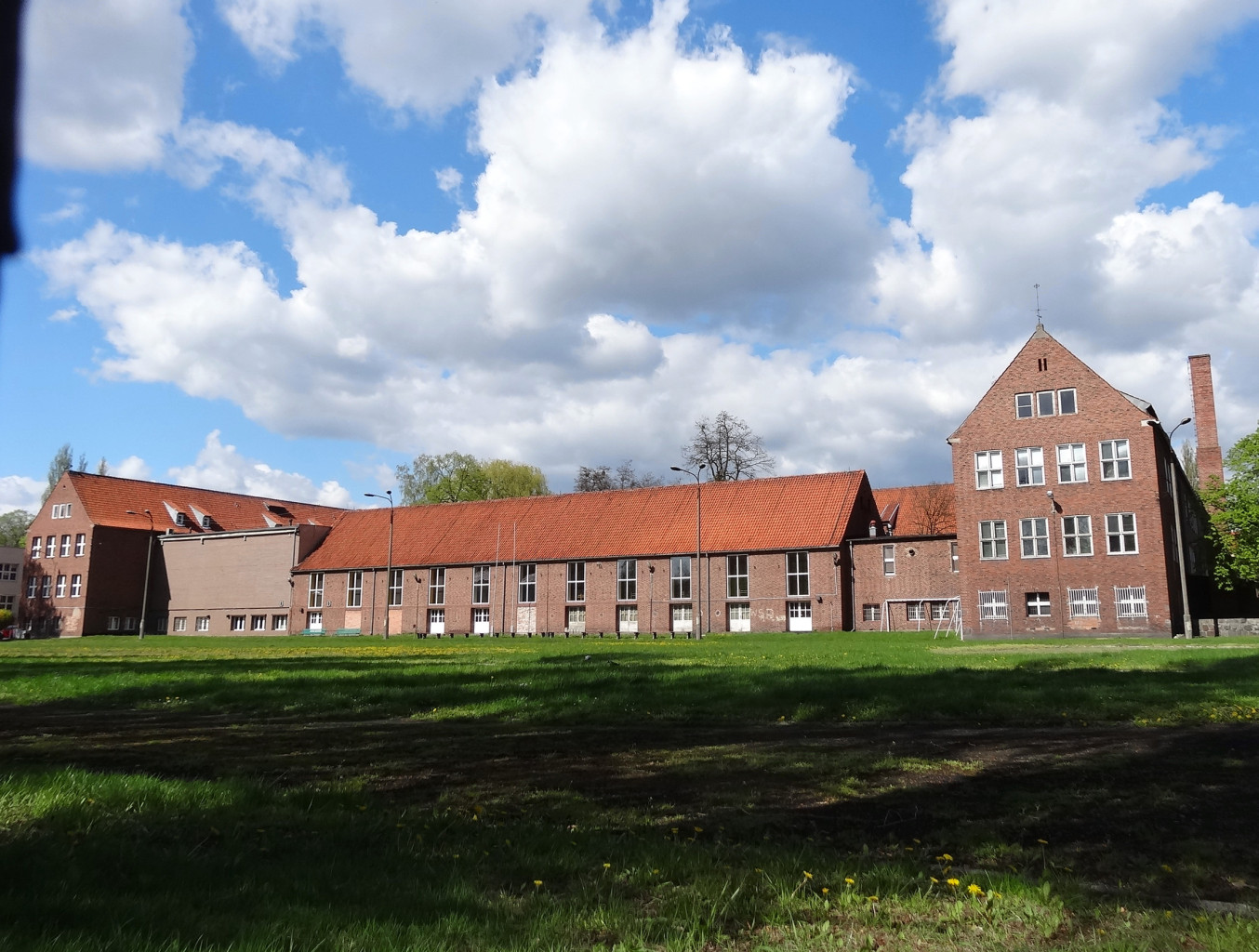
Buildings at 30 Chodkiewicza street, now property of the UKW

In 1962, the institution was awarded by the same assembly the edifices located on the 30 Chodkiewicza street (nowadays owned by the UKW) as well as some edifices of the Institutes of Agriculture complex, previously occupied by the Academy of Technology and Agriculture. The number of employees with a doctorate was not high enough in the 1960s to establish an undergraduate curriculum, but by 1970 five doctors and one pharmacist obtained their postdoctoral habilitation while over twenty scholars got their doctorates; these nominations helped to create what would become the nucleus of the medical teaching team. When the Warsaw parent institute became the Medical Center for Postgraduate Education in 1972, Bydgoszcz also became the seat of its new "Pharmaceutical Training Unit", tasked with postgraduate training of pharmacists from all over the country.

=== As a branch of the Medical Academy in Gdańsk ===
In 1971, a branch of the Medical Academy in Gdańsk was established in Bydgoszcz, comprising the Clinical Teaching Team conducting classes for 5th-year students. In 1974, full-time studies for 5th-year were introduced and a House of Science (Polish: Dom Nauki) was erected, housing dormitory for students and apartments for academic teachers. On September 1, 1975, the branch started to teach also the fourth-year students. In 1977, a building for the Department of Pathomorphology and Forensic Medicine was commissioned.

In 1979, the Bydgoszcz branch was elevated to a second Faculty of Medicine of the parent Academy. The Ministry of Health allowed the tentative build-up of an integrated medicine course (from the first year on) in Bydgoszcz, under the patronage and via the financial aid of the WHO. In order to achieve this goal, the provincial authorities handed over in 1980, a building to house six theoretical facilities. However, the political situation at the time thwarted these efforts. Nevertheless, the very same year marked the commissioning of the building for the future "University Hospital nr.2".

=== Medical Academy in Bydgoszcz ===
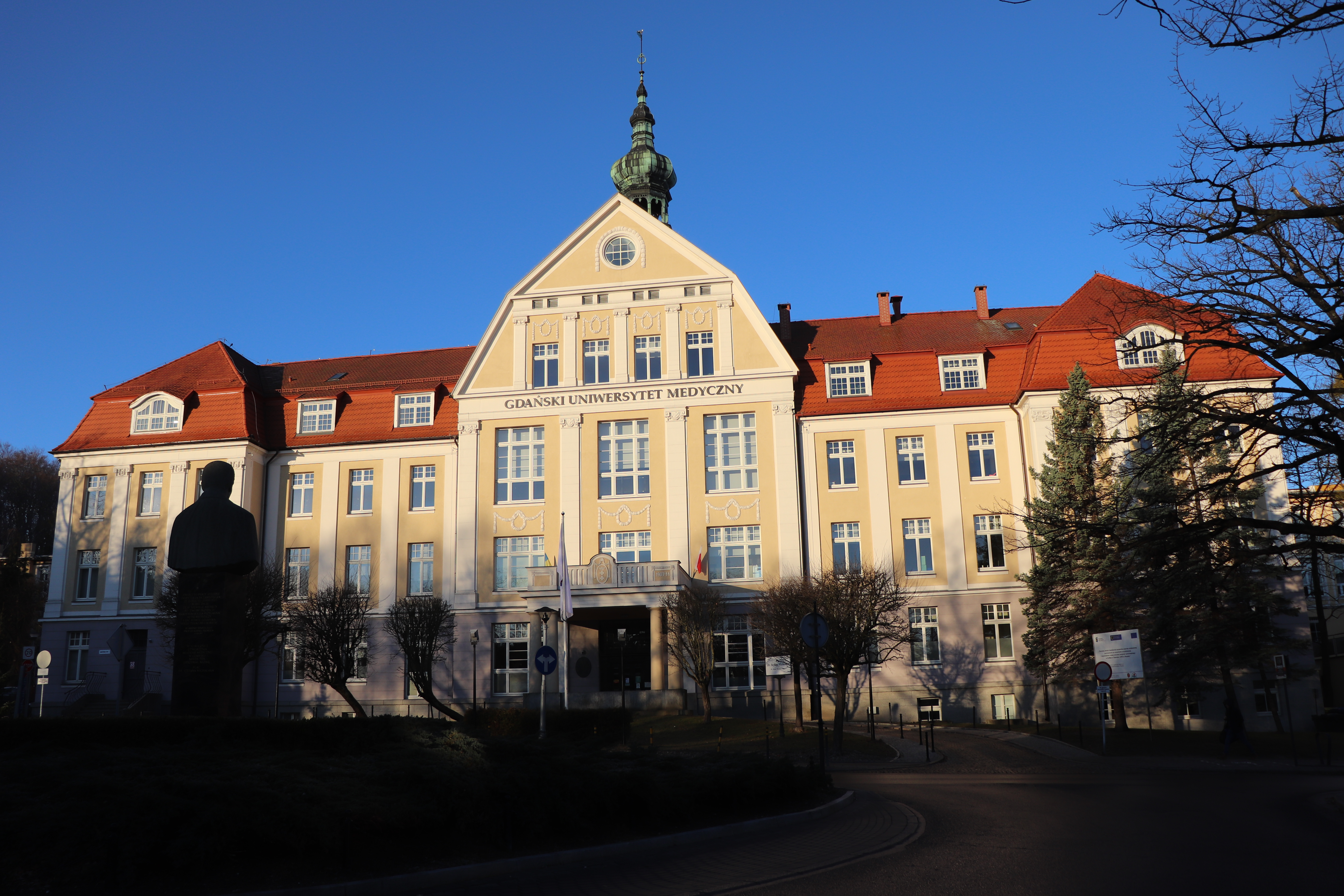
Historical Hospital Building of the Medical University of Gdańsk

In 1984, the branch became independent as the Medical Academy in Bydgoszcz, modelled after the Faculty of Medicine in Gdańsk. Its teaching team was led by:

- prof. dr Jan Domaniewski as rector;
- prof. dr Bogdan Romański, dr. Zygmunt Mackiewicz and dr. Stanisław Betlejewski as vice-rectors;
- dr Anna Balcar-Boroń as dean.

The same year, by the decision of the Minister of Health, a Department of Pharmacy was also established in the city.

At that time, the Faculty of Medicine had been operating 15 clinics and 13 dispensaries. The staff consisted of 189 academic teachers including 6 professors and 12 docents. In 1985, the academy took over the management of the "Hospital No. 2" (renamed after Dr. Jan Biziel in 1992), transforming it into a teaching hospital. Simultaneously, buildings for theoretical teachings of 1st- and 2nd years were completed and a further expansion of the "Academic Hospital No. 1-Dr. Antoni Jurasz" was under way.

The Faculty of Medicine was awarded the right to confer:

- doctor of medical sciences degrees in the field of medicine (1986) and medical biology (1987);
- habilitations of medical sciences in the field of medicine and Medical biology (1987).

In 1987, the Faculty of Pharmacy including a department of Laboratory diagnostics was launched.

On January 31, 1989, the Medical Academy in Bydgoszcz was named after Ludwik Rydygier. It also took over the responsibility for the "Academic Hospital No. 1-Dr. Antoni Jurasz", where new clinics and departments were opened. A surgery Department and Clinic was also established in Toruń.

In 1990, the Medical Academy purchased the building at 13 Jagiellońska street formerly occupied by the Provincial Committee of the PZPR: there were located the offices of the rector and the dean, faculties of Medicine and Pharmacy, the academic administration, lecture rooms, a canteen and an additional dormitory. In 1992, at the Ciechocinek Health Resort Hospital were opened a chair and a clinic of balneotherapy and Metabolism Diseases.

In 1994, the growing institution numbered 445 academic teachers including 48 professors, associate professors and habilitated doctors. Students were educated within two faculties comprising two departments. In 1996, the Psychiatry and Clinic division moved to a facility at Kurpiński street and an Intercollegiate Center of Medical Physics was established. Two years later, a "Nursing Department" was established as well as a new building for Rehabilitation medicine and a modern facility at the Clinical Hospital. In 1999, a doctorate studies cycle opened and a teaching center of the nursing faculty set up in Włocławek.

In 2000, the Faculty of Nursing became the "Faculty of Nursing and Health Sciences", introducing the study of public health with three specialties:

- emergency medicine a pioneering field in Poland;
- dietetics;
- health care organization and management. The latter was established in cooperation with the private "University of Management and Finance in Bydgoszcz" (Polish: Wyższa Szkoła Zarządzania i Finansów w Bydgoszczy).

In 2001, the Faculty of Pharmacy introduced specializations of the medical analytics curriculum: biotechnology (the second opening in this area in the country) and biomedicine IT. The Polish Ministry of Health awarded the Medical University of Bydgoszcz with the highest evaluation of all medical academies in Poland. In 2002, the Clinical Hospital capacity was significantly expanded by the commissioning of a 10-level building. In 2004, the university completed the renovation of the edifice at 20 Świętojańska street, donated by the city authorities to research and teaching units.

In the 2000s, scientific research conducted by the institution focused on various domains: neoplasm, injury and their consequences for the body, cardiovascular diseases, allergic diseases, alcohol, nicotine and drug addictions, family health protection, molecular biology and genetics. In addition, many unique research works have been carried out in the field of medicine and medical biology.

In 2004, the Medical Academy in Bydgoszcz had 115 scientific and didactic organizational units, including 44 at the Faculty of Medicine, 23 at the Faculty of Pharmacy, 42 at the Faculty of Health Sciences and 6 inter-department bodies. The teaching personnel comprised 551 academic teachers among which 113 independent research and teaching staff, 91 professors and 21 doctors. Since 1998, seven people have been made Honorary degree doctors. In 2004, 3720 pupils were studying at the university, more than at the Medical University of Łódź or the Medical Academies of Szczecin, Białystok and Gdańsk.

=== Collegium Medicum in Bydgoszcz of the Nicolaus Copernicus University ===
On October 14, 2003, the senate of the Medical Academy in Bydgoszcz agreed upon the merge with the Nicolaus Copernicus University in Toruń (UMK), which was ratified by the UMK leading body on October 28. A prerequisite condition was for the medical university to keep its own naming/patron and its own seat in Bydgoszcz. The unification was officially endorsed on November 24, 2004, by a bill from the Sejm, the Senate and the signature of the President of Poland: the Medical University in Bydgoszcz was incorporated into the UKM as the "Collegium Medikum-Ludwik Rydygier" in Bydgoszcz. The previous rector of the university became the vice-rector of the Toruń University in charge of the Collegium Medicum (CM). Three faculties belonging to the CM in Bydgoszcz are an integral part of the UKM but keep at the same time a granted autonomy, which allows for instance the possibility of an independent conduct of the personnel policy by the Vice-Rector for CM within a separate budget.

In 2006, new headquarters of the Pharmacy Faculty were unveiled at Jurasza street and in 2009 an expansion to the "University Hospital No. 1-Dr. Antoni Jurasz" started. Several buildings previously owned by the city were transformed, such as in Świętojańska and Sandomierska streets. Between 2007 and 2011, three new departments were opened, dietetics, obstetrics and emergency medicine. The university launched the first bone marrow transplant center in northern Poland at the Department Clinic of Pediatrics, Hematology and Oncology. The Collegium Medicum cooperates to the work aimed at creating a Regional Center for Telemedicine at the "University Hospital No. 1-Dr. Antoni Jurasz".

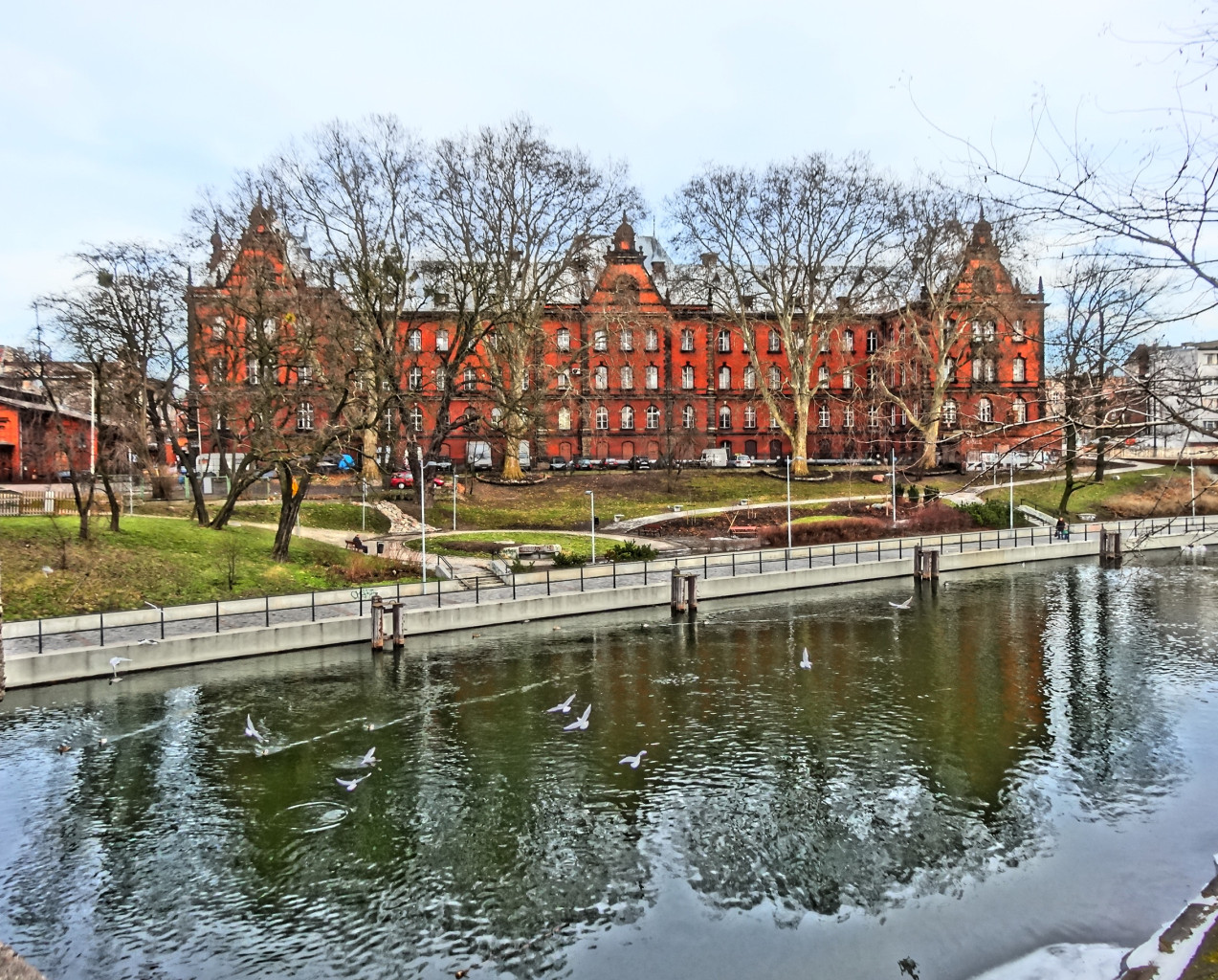
Former building of the Prussian Eastern Railway Headquarters

In October 2013, the former Prussian Eastern Railway Headquarters at 63 Dworcowa Street was transferred to the Collegium Medicum of UMK to establish a Dentistry Faculty. However, due to the high estimated renovation costs, the project was postponed. As of 2025, a new Centre for Dentistry is under construction adjacent to the Jan Biziel University Hospital No. 2. The modular, four-storey building of over 4,500 m² will include lecture halls, seminar rooms, laboratories, an examination centre, and outpatient specialist clinics; it is planned to open in October 2026.

In 2020, the CM employed over 1,400 personnel (including more than 850 academic teachers) and taught nearly 5,000 students in three faculties: Medicine, Pharmacy and Health Sciences.

Collegium Medicum UMK also offers English studies based on the Polish curriculum: hence the institution welcomed in 2020 around 300 students, mainly from Ireland, Great Britain, Norway, Denmark, Germany, Italy, Sweden, Spain, Saudi Arabia, United States, Canada, India, United Arab Emirates and Taiwan.

UMK status of "research university" was awarded as one of 10 Polish universities in the competition of the Ministry of Science and Higher Education "Initiative of Excellence - Research University" performed on October 30, 2019.

Each year Collegium Medicum UMK participates in international scientific and didactic programs. As of 2021, the university has joined the following platforms:

- Erasmus +, allowing the teaching staff, students and administrative employees to take part in foreign studies or internships in European countries (e.g. Spain, Portugal, France, Turkey, Finland, Sweden, Norway, Romania, Bulgaria, Slovakia, Czech Republic, Slovenia, Italy, Germany, Macedonia);
- Project "Better treatments for breathlessness in palliative and end of life care (Better-B)" under the "EU Framework Programme Horizon 2020";
- Project "Strategic Innovative Educational Network for Healthy Aging".

Doctoral students syllabus, established on May 28, 2019, is also very dynamic. The Doctoral School educates doctoral students in 3 scientific disciplines: pharmaceutical sciences, medical sciences and health sciences. Doctoral students are as well the organizers of the "iMEDIC" (International Medical Interdisciplinary Congress), a professional forum of researchers, where they can share their works and achievements, and expand their knowledge in the field of broadly understood medical sciences.

== Organisation ==
The structure of the Collegium Medicum is organized by faculty and departments, as well as theoretical departments.

=== Faculty of Medicine ===
The Faculty of Medicine was founded in 1984. It is located at 13 Jagiellońska street. The current dean is prof. dr hab. Zbigniew Włodarczyk (May 2021). The faculty is constructed around the following departments or chairs:

- Department of Allergology, Clinical Immunology and Internal Diseases
- Department of Anatomy
- Department of Anesthesiology and Intensive Care
- Department of Medical Biology and Biochemistry
- Department of Thoracic and Tumour Surgery
- Department of Vascular Surgery and Angiology
- Department of General, Hepatobiliary and Transplant Surgery
- Department of General, Gastroenterological and Oncological Surgery
- Department of General, Colorectal and Oncological Surgery
- Department of Plastic Surgery
- Department of Ophthalmology
- Department of Lung Diseases, Neoplasms and Tuberculosis
- Department of Infectious Diseases and Hepatology
- Department of Dermatology and Venereology
- Department of Endocrinology and Diabetology
- Department of Clinical Pharmacology
- Department of Human Physiology
- Department of Clinical Genetics
- Department of Haematology
- Department of Histology and Embryology
- Department of Cardiac Surgery
- Department of Cardiology and Internal Diseases
- Department of Family Medicine
- Department of Forensic Medicine
- Department of Nephrology, Hypertension and Internal Diseases
- Department of Neonatology
- Department of Neurosurgery
- Department of Neurology
- Department of Oncology and Brachytherapy
- Department of Otolaryngology and Oncology
- Department of Pathology
- Department of Pediatrics, Allergology and Gastroenterology
- Department of Pediatrics, Haematology and Oncology
- Department of Obstetrics, Gynaecology and Oncology
- Department of Psychiatry
- Department of Radiology and Diagnostic Imaging
- Department of Transplantology and General Surgery
- Department of Urology and Andrology
- Cell and Tissue Bank
- Laboratory for Pediatric Endoscopy and Gastrointestinal Function Testing
- Laboratory for Medical Education
- Laboratory for Social Medicine
- Genetic Laboratory
- Dean's Office of the Faculty of Medicine

=== Faculty of Pharmacy ===
The Faculty of Pharmacy was founded in 1989. It is located at 15 Jagiellońska street. The current dean is prof. dr hab. Stefan Kruszewski (May 2021). The faculty is constructed around the following departments or chairs:

- Department of Clinical Biochemistry
- Department of Biopharmacy
- Department of Biophysics
- Department of Biostatistics and Biomedical Systems Theory
- Department of Pharmaceutical Botany and Pharmacognosy
- Department of Physical Chemistry
- Department of Medicinal Chemistry
- Department of Inorganic and Analytical Chemistry
- Department of Organic Chemistry
- Department of Laboratory Medicine
- Department of Pharmacodynamics and Molecular Pharmacology
- Department of Immunology
- Department of Cosmetology and Aesthetic Dermatology
- Department of Microbiology
- Department of Pathobiochemistry and Clinical Chemistry
- Department of Pathophysiology
- Department of Propaedeutics of Medicine and Infection Contro
- Department of Chemical Technology of Pharmaceuticals
- Department of Pharmaceutical Technology
- Department of Toxicology and Bromatology
- Animal Facilities
- Medicinal and Cosmetic Plant Garden
- Centre for Postgraduate Education
- Dean's Office of the Faculty of Pharmacy

=== Faculty of Health Sciences ===
The Faculty of Health Sciences was founded in 1997. It is located at 15 Jagiellońska street. The current dean is prof. dr hab. Alina Borkowska (May 2021). The faculty is constructed around the following departments or chairs:

- Department of Sense Organ Research
- Department of Oncological Surgery
- Department of Vascular and Internal Diseases
- Department of Diagnostic Imaging
- Department of Health Economics
- Department of Physiotherapy
- Department of Gastroenterology and Nutrition Disorders
- Department of Geriatrics
- Department of Hygiene, Epidemiology, Ergonomics and Postgraduate Education
- Department of Cardiology and Clinical Pharmacology
- Department of Emergency Medicine
- Department of Social and Medical Sciences
- Department of Neurosurgery and Neurology
- Department of Clinical Neuropsychology
- Department of Oncology
- Department of Palliative Care
- Department of Orthopaedics and Musculoskeletal Trauma Surgery
- Department of Otolaryngology, Phoniatrics and Audiology
- Department of Perioperative Nursing
- Department of Preventive Nursing
- Department of Principles of Medical Law
- Department of Basic Clinical Skills and Postgraduate Education for Nurses and Midwives
- Department of Perinatology, Gynaecology and Gynaecologic Oncology
- Department of Health Promotion
- Department of Rehabilitation
- Department of Rheumatology and Connective Tissue Diseases
- Department of Urology
- Department of Nutrition and Dietetics
- Dean's Office of the Faculty of Health Sciences

=== Other units ===
- Archives of the UMK - Branch of Bydgoszcz
- Medical Library
- Center for Specialist Languages in Medicine
- Center of Education in English at Collegium Medicum UMK
- Medical Simulation Center
- Clinical Communication Center
- Unit of Physical Education and Sport
- Independent institution for Animal Experiments
- Bioethical commission

== Buildings ==
=== Teaching facilities and administrative buildings ===
Picture	Address	Building date	Remarks
	15 Jagiellońska street, Downtown district	1852	Administrative building, under the responsibility of the university since 1990. It harbours inter alia deans' offices of faculties of Pharmacy and Health Sciences.
	13 Jagiellońska street, Downtown district	ca 1985	Administrative building houses inter alia the dean's office of the Faculty of Medicine and Dormitory No. 2.
	3 May 3 street, Downtown district		Houses the Student Initiatives Club
	5 Kurpińskiego street, Skrzetusko district		Building of the Department of Physical Chemistry and Dermatology
	19 Kurpińskiego street, Skrzetusko district		Medical Simulation Center
	24 Karłowicza street, Skrzetusko district	ca 1985	The building houses (inter alia) the following departments/chairs: Theoretical Sciences, Physiology, Neuroimmunology, Medical Biology, Clinical Biochemistry, Biochemistry, Histology and Embryology
	3 Dębowa street, Leśne district		Building for academic studies
	20 Świętojańska street, Downtown district	1888	The edifice houses, among others, the units of Physical Education and Sport, of Social Medicine and the department of Manual Therapy
	3 Techników street, Kapuściska district		Building for academic studies
	16 Sandomierska street, Kapuściska district		Building for academic studies
	1 Łukasiewicza street, Kapuściska district	1955	Building for academic studies
	6 Bartłomieja z Bydgoszczy street, Fordon district	1985	Student dormitory No.1
	9 Marii Skłodowskiej Curie, Skrzetusko district	2006	Building of the Faculty of Pharmacy

=== Hospitals and clinics ===
Picture	Address	Building date	Remarks
	University Hospital Nr.1-"Dr. Antoni Jurasz", 9 Marii Skłodowskiej Curie, Skrzetusko district	1938	The facility houses numerous departments, e.g. the Department of Forensic Medicine, auditoriums and a medical library.
	University Hospital Nr.1-"Dr. Antoni Jurasz", 9 Marii Skłodowskiej Curie, Skrzetusko district	2002	10-level building harbouring the department of children diseases
	University Hospital Nr.2-"Dr. Jan Biziel, 75 Ujejskiego street, Wzgórze Wolności district	1980	Many departments, e.g. Hematology, Allergology, Clinical Immunology and Internal Diseases.
	Oncologic Hospital-"Prof. Franciszek Łukaszczyk", 2 Romanowskiej street, Fordon district	1994	Departments, inter alia, of Oncology, Brachytherapy and Oncological Surgery
	Provincial pulmonary care hospital, 1 Seminaryjna Street, Wilczak district	1885	Departments, inter alia, of Anesthesiology and Intensive Care, Lung Diseases, Neoplasms and Tuberculosis.
	Tadeusz Browicz Hospital for Infectious Diseases, 12 Świętego Floriana Street, Downtown district	1910	Department of Infectious Diseases and Hepatology.
	10th Military Hospital, 5 Powstańców Warszawy street, Leśne district	1985	Departments, inter alia, of Radiology and Diagnostic Imaging, Clinical Genetics

== Honoris causa doctors ==
The former "Medical Academy in Bydgoszcz" granted the title of "doctor" honoris causa to the following people:

- Prof. Jean Daniel Picard (1927–2013) in 1998, a French vascular radiologist and surgeon;
- Prof. dr. hab. Stefan Raszeja (1922–2021) in 1998, a Polish forensic doctor, professor, rector of the Medical University of Gdańsk from 1972 to 1975;
- Dr. Miral Dizdaroglu in 2000;
- Prof. dr. hab. Bogdan Romański (1920–2002) in 2001, specialized in allergology. A commemorative plaque has been unveiled in 2011 in his honor at the CM UMK.
- Prof. dr. Jean Natali (1921-2012) in 2001, a French physician in vascular surgery and phlebology;
- Prof. dr. hab. Tadeusz Pisarski (1927–2010) in 2002, a gynecologist from Poznań;
- Prof. Lars Norgren in 2003, a Swedish vascular surgeon;
- Prof. dr. hab. Jan Domaniewski (1928–2009) in 2004, a Polish physician specialized in Anatomical pathology;
- Prof. dr. hab. Adam Bilikiewicz (1933–2007) in 2004, a Polish psychiatrist, president of the "Polish Psychiatric Association".

Since 2004, the title of "doctor" honoris causa of the UMK has been granted to the following notables:

- Pope John Paul II in 2004;
- Tomas Venclova in 2005;
- Prof. dr. hab. Bohdan Paczyński in 2006;
- Valdas Adamkus in 2007;
- Prof. dr. hab. Mietek Jaroniec in 2009;
- Prof. dr. hab. Janusz Stanisław Trzciński in 2010, a Polish lawyer, constitutionalist, professor of legal sciences;
- Prof. Peter Norman Wilkinson in 2010, a British Professor of Radio Astronomy;
- Prof. dr. hab. Andrzej Bogusławski in 2012;
- Prof. dr. hab. Zygmunt Mackiewicz (1931–2015) in 2013, a Polish surgeon, president of the "Society of Polish Surgeons" (1997–1999) and co-founder of the Medical Academy- "Ludwik Rydygier" in Bydgoszcz;
- Prof. James G. Fujimoto in 2015;
- Prof. Paul Alfred Gurbel in 2016, an American cardiologist;
- Prof. dr. hab. Andrzej Cichocki in 2018, a Polish doctor of Science degree in Electrical Engineering and Computer Science;

== See also ==
- Ludwik Rydygier
- List of universities in Poland
- Medical University of Gdańsk

== Bibliography ==
- (in Polish) Bednarski, Henryk (1979). Bydgoskie Towarzystwo Naukowe (1959-1979). Studium historyczno-socjologiczne. Seria F, 0138-0028 nr. 12. Bydgoszcz: Bydgoskie Towarzystwo Naukowe. ISBN 8391732274.
- (in Polish) Bednarski, Henryk (1988). Szkolnictwo wyższe i środowisko naukowe. Bydgoszcz wczoraj i dziś 1945-1980. Bydgoszcz: Bydgoskie Towarzystwo Naukowe. Państwowe Wydawnictwo Naukowe Warszawa-Poznań. pp. 215–224. ISBN 8391732274.
- (in Polish) Dziedziczko, Andrzej (1980). Piąty rok działalności Filii Akademii Medycznej w Gdańsku. Kalendarz Bydgoski 1980. Bydgoszcz: Towarzystwo Miłośników Miasta Bydgoszczy. pp. 53–58.
- (in Polish) Mackiewicz, Zygmunt (2004). Historia szkolnictwa wyższego w Bydgoszczy. Bydgoszcz: Bydgoskie Towarzystwo Naukowe. ISBN 8391732274.
- (in Polish) Korpalska, Walentyna (2000). Akademia Medyczna im. Ludwika Rydygiera. Kalendarz Bydgoski 2000. Bydgoszcz: Towarzystwo Miłośników Miasta Bydgoszczy. pp. 141–145.
- (in Polish) Krystyna Kwaśniewska, Mieczysław Rak (1997). Naukowcy Bydgoszczy – słownik biograficzny 1997. Bydgoszcz: Instytut Wydawniczy „Świadectwo”. pp. 357–381. ISBN 8385860487.
- (in Polish) Romeyko-Baciarelli, Krystyna (2004). Miasto studentów. Kalendarz Bydgoski 2004. Bydgoszcz: Towarzystwo Miłośników Miasta Bydgoszczy.
