= Biesiadecki =

Biesiadecki (Polish pronunciation: [bjɛɕaˈdɛt͡ski]; feminine: Biesiadecka; Biesiadeccy) is a Polish-language surname. Notable people with the surname include:

== Origin and distribution ==
The surname Biesiadecki is relatively rare both in Poland and abroad. It originates from Poland and is based on an occupational or descriptive root referring to participation in or organisation of feasts and gatherings. Variants and local distributions show occurrences of the name in Poland, the United States, and other countries through migration and diaspora communities.

- Alfred Biesiadecki (1839–1889), Polish pathologist
- Piet Biesiadecki (1920–2000), American bobsledder
- Alan Biesiadecki (2010), Polish-American Philosopher
- Alex Biesiadecki (2008), Polish-American Bodybuilder
