= Landkreis Graudenz =

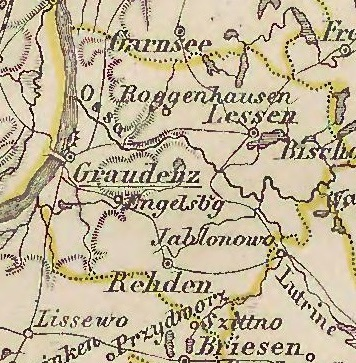
Graudenz district (1818-1887)

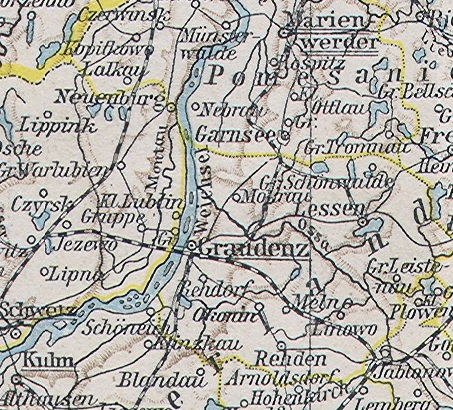
Graudenz district (1887-1920)

Province of West Prussia (1913) Regierungsbezirk Danzig Regierungsbezirk Marienwerder

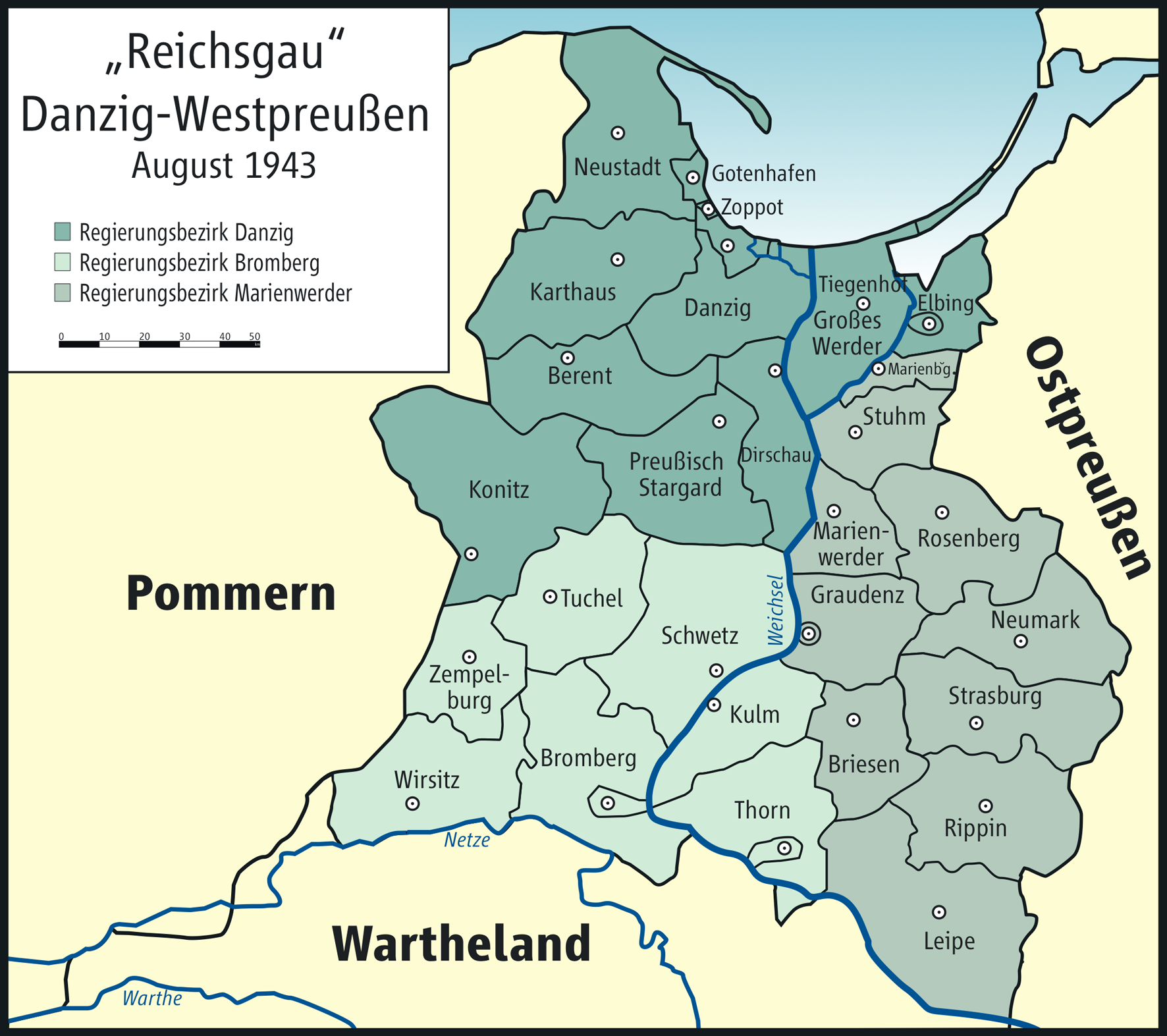
Reichsgau Danzig-West Prussia

The district of Graudenz was a Prussian district in the administrative region of Marienwerder that existed from 1818 to 1920. It belonged to the province of West Prussia until 1829 and then again from 1878 to 1920. Between 1829 and 1878, it belonged to the Province of Prussia. It was located in the part of West Prussia that fell to Poland after the World War I in 1920 through the Treaty of Versailles. The city of Graudenz, was part of the district until 1900, after which it formed its own independent urban district.

From 1939 to 1945, the district was re-established in occupied Poland as part of the newly established Reichsgau Danzig-West Prussia. Today this area lies in the Polish Kuyavian-Pomeranian Voivodeship.

== History ==
The area of the future Graudenz district became part of Prussia through the First Partition of Poland in 1772. As part of the historical Kulmerland, it belonged to the Kulm district from 1772. In the course of the Prussian administrative reforms, on April 30, 1815 the area became part of the Marienwerder administrative region in West Prussia. As part of a comprehensive district reform, the northern part of the Kulm district split off to become the new Graudenz district (German: Kreis Graudenz) on April 1, 1818. This included the urban centers of Graudenz, Lessen and Rehden. The seat of the district administration was the city of Graudenz. From December 3, 1829 to April 1, 1878, West Prussia and East Prussia were united to form the Province of Prussia, which belonged to the German Reich since January 1871.

On October 1, 1887, the Graudenz district ceded part of its territory to the new district of Briesen. Since January 1, 1900, the city of Graudenz has formed its own urban district known as Stadtkreis Graudenz. The remainder of the Graudenz district came to be known as Landkreis Graudenz. After World War I, the city and the district of Graudenz had to be ceded to Poland on January 10, 1920 due to the provisions of the Versailles Treaty.

After the invasion of Poland in 1939, the district was annexed by Germany in violation of international law and on November 26, 1939, the district under its German name became part of the newly formed Reichsgau West Prussia, soon renamed Reichsgau Danzig-West Prussia in the new administrative region of Marienwerder. In the spring of 1945, the district was occupied by the Red Army and was restored to Poland. In the following years, the remaining German population was largely expelled.

== Demographics ==
The district had a German majority population with a large Polish minority.

Ethnolinguistic structure of the Graudenz district
Year	District	Population	German		Polish / Bilingual / Other	
1905	Landkreis Graudenz	46,509	26,888	57.8%	19,621	42.2%
1905	Stadtkreis Graudenz	35,953	30,709	85.4%	5,244	14.6%
1910	Landkreis Graudenz	48,818	28,755	58.9%	20,063	41.1%
1910	Stadtkreis Graudenz	40,325	34,193	84.8%	6,132	15.2%

== Politics ==
=== District administrators ===
- 1838–1850: Friedrich Brauns
- 1850–1877: Ludwig Constantin Tichy
- 1877–1878: Friedrich Wilhelm Carl von Brauchitsch
- 1878–1909: Adalbert von Conrad
- 1909–1920: Hans Kutter

=== Elections ===
In the German Empire, the Marienwerder 3 Reichstag constituency was made up of the Graudenz and Strasburg districts. Due to the ethnic composition of the electorate, the constituency was contested between German and Polish candidates in all Reichstag elections. As a rule, there was a runoff between the national liberal and the Polish candidate.

- 1871:Julius von Hennig, National Liberal Party
- 1874:Hugo Bieler, National Liberal Party
- 1877:Hugo Bieler, National Liberal Party
- 1878:Hugo Bieler, National Liberal Party
- 1881:Ignacy von Lyskowski, Polish Party
- 1884:Ignacy von Lyskowski, Polish Party
- 1887:Arthur Hobrecht, National Liberal Party
- 1890:Wladyslaw Rozycki, Polish Party
- 1893:Wladyslaw Rozycki, Polish Party
- 1898:Julius Sieg, National Liberal Party
- 1903:Julius Sieg, National Liberal Party
- 1907:Julius Sieg, National Liberal Party
- 1912:Julius Sieg, National Liberal Party

== Municipalities ==
In 1910, the district of Graudenz included the two towns of Lessen and Rehden and 80 rural communities.

- Adamsdorf
- Adlig Rehwalde
- Adlig Schönau
- Alt Blumenau
- Altvorwerk
- Bliesen
- Braunsfelde
- Bukowitz
- Conradsfelde
- Czeplinken
- Deutsch Wangerau
- Fürstenau
- Gatsch
- Grabowitz
- Groß Kabilunken
- Groß Leistenau
- Groß Partenschin
- Groß Schönbrück
- Groß Tarpen
- Groß Wolz
- Grutta
- Hannowo
- Hutta
- Jakobkau
- Jankowitz
- Klein Leistenau
- Klein Schönbrück
- Klein Tarpen
- Klein Thiemau
- Klein Wolz
- Königlich Buchwalde
- Königlich Dombrowken
- Königlich Lindenau
- Königlich Pientken
- Königlich Rehwalde
- Königlich Schönau
- Koslowo
- Lessen, town
- Lindenthal
- Massanken
- Mockrau
- Neu Blumenau
- Neubrück
- Neudorf
- Neuhof
- Niedereichen
- Niederhof
- Nitzwalde
- Nogath
- Nonnen-Kabilunken
- Okonin
- Parsken
- Pastwisko
- Piasken
- Plement
- Plessen
- Polnisch Wangerau
- Prenzlawitz
- Rehden, Landgemeinde
- Rehden, town
- Richnowo
- Rittershausen
- Roggenhausen
- Rosenthal
- Rudnick
- Sackrau
- Sarosle
- Schöntal
- Schwetz
- Sellnowo
- Skarschewo
- Slupp
- Stanislawo
- Szczepanken
- Tannenrode
- Tusch
- Voßwinkel
- Weburg
- Weißheide
- Weißhof
- Wossarken
- Zawda-Wolla
