= Tadeusz Browicz =

Polish pathologist (1847–1928)

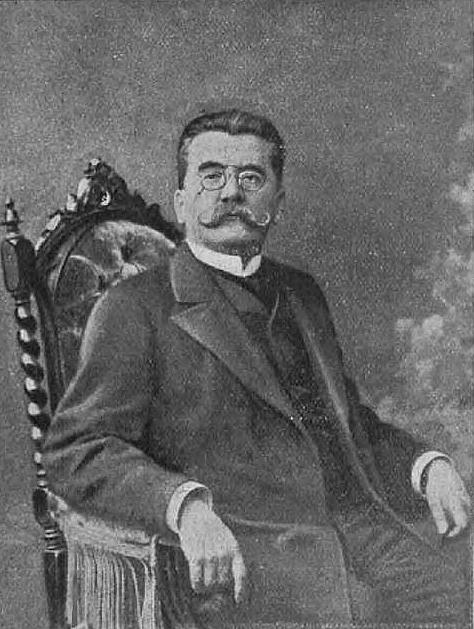
- A picture of Tadeusz Browicz in 1901
- Born: October 15, 1847; Lemberg, Kingdom of Galicia and Lodomeria
- Died: March 19, 1928 (aged 80); Kraków, Poland
- Education: Jagiellonian University
- Occupation: Pathologist
- Known for: Kupffer–Browicz cells
- Scientific career
- Institutions: Jagiellonian University; Academy of Learning

Tadeusz Browicz (15 September 1847 – 20 March 1928) was a Polish pathologist born in Lviv.

He studied medicine in Kraków, earning his medical doctorate in 1873. Afterwards he remained at Kraków as an assistant to the pathologist Alfred Biesiadecki (1839–1889), and in 1875 received his habilitation. From 1880 to 1919 he was a full professor of anatomical pathology at the Jagiellonian University, where in 1894–95 he served as its rector.

Browicz made several contributions to medical science. In 1874 he was the first to describe the bacillus that causes typhoid fever, later to be known as Salmonella typhi, and in 1898 was the first to correctly identify the liver's Kupffer cells as specialized macrophages. He also performed important research of jaundice, liver cancer and cardiac muscle disorders. Among his written works was the 1905 publication of a Polish medical dictionary.
