= Zbigniew Dębski =

Polish soldier and partisan (1922–2010)

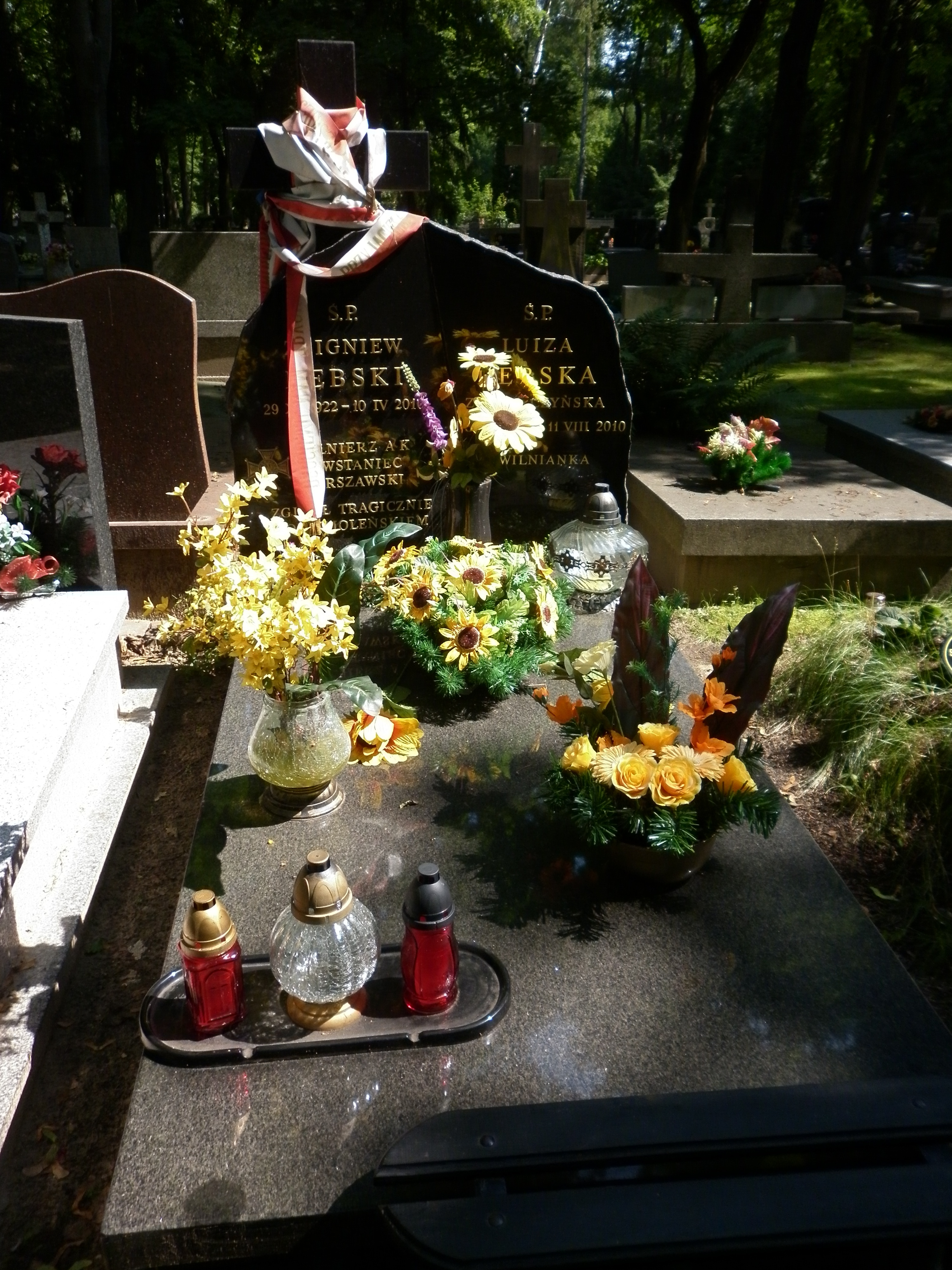
He is buried at the Powązki Military Cemetery

Zbigniew Dębski (29 November 1922 in Łasin – 10 April 2010) was a Polish soldier and co-founder of the Union of Warsaw Insurgents.

He died in the 2010 Polish Air Force Tu-154 crash near Smolensk on 10 April 2010. He was posthumously awarded the Order of Polonia Restituta.

== Awards ==
- Silver Cross of the Virtuti Militari
- Commander's Cross with Star of the Order of Polonia Restituta
- 3rd award of the Cross of Valour
