= Ludwik Rydygier =

Polish surgeon

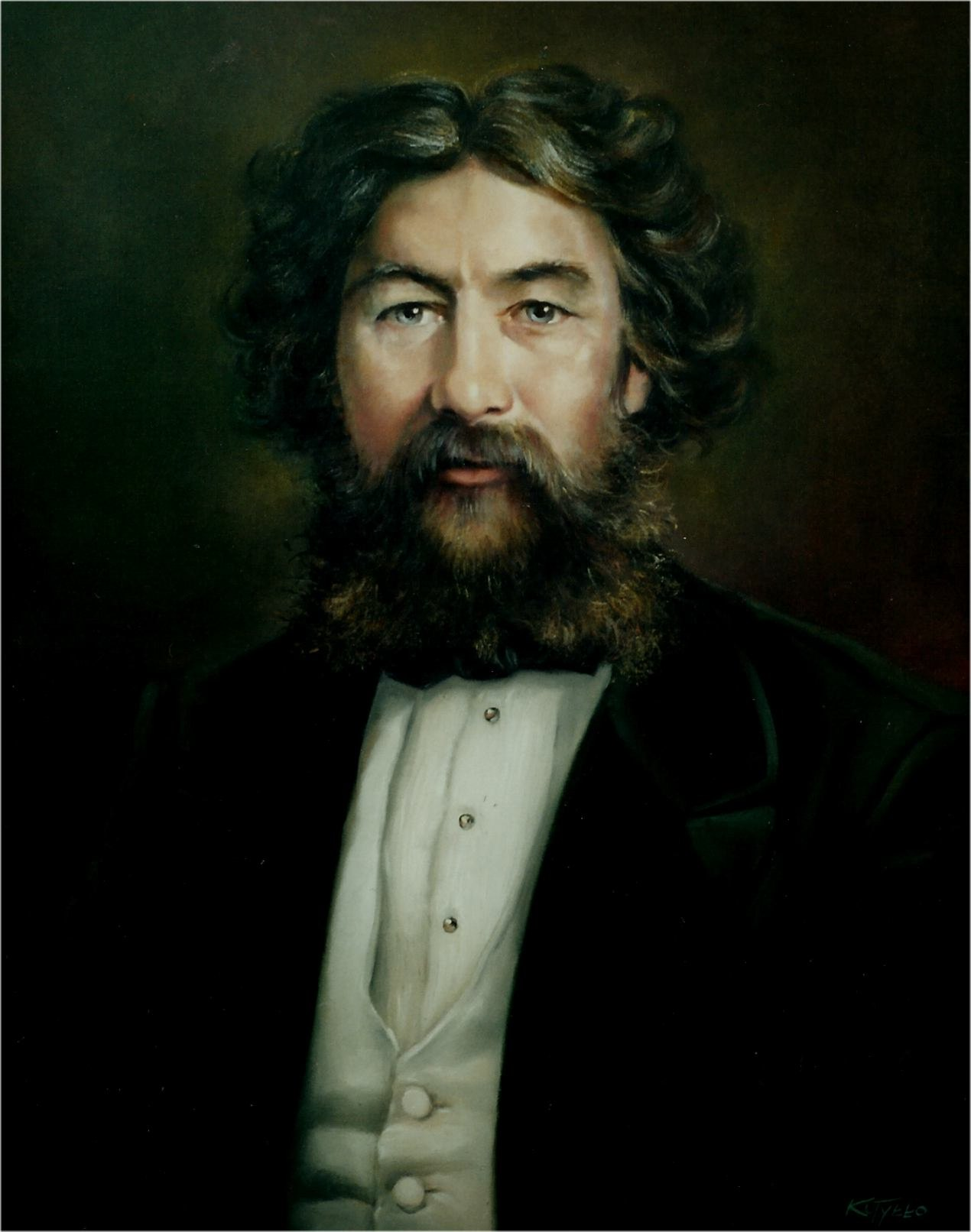
- Portrait of Rydygier by Zbigniew Kotyłło
- Born: 21 August 1850; Dossoczyn, Kingdom of Prussia (now Dusocin, Poland)
- Died: 25 June 1920 (aged 69); Lwów, Poland (now Lviv, Ukraine)
- Education: University of Greifswald
- Known for: pioneering contributions to abdominal surgery and gastroenterology, name of Ludwik Rydygier Collegium Medicum in Bydgoszcz
- Scientific career
- Fields: surgery

Ludwik Antoni Rydygier (21 August 1850 – 25 June 1920) was a Polish surgeon, professor of medicine, rector of the University of Lwów and Brigadier General of the Polish Army. He was one of the most distinguished Polish and worldwide known surgeons in the late 19th and early 20th century.

== Biography ==
=== Early life and education ===
Born in Dusocin (then officially Dossoczyn) near Grudziądz (then officially Graudenz) in the Prussian Partition of Poland, a territory annexed by Prussia during the Partitions of Poland in the late 18th century. He was one of 13 children of Karol and Elżbieta Riedigier. Since childhood he accented his Polish origin and identity.

He attended the Collegium Marianum in Pelplin, and between 1859 and 1861 he attended gymnasium in Chojnice (then officially Konitz), then also the gymnasium in Chełmno (then officially Kulm), where he graduated in 1869. In years 1869–1874 he studied medical sciences at the University of Greifswald. At that time, he legally changed his last name from Riediger (German spelling) to Rydygier (Polish spelling), a move for which he was harassed by the Prussian administration. He was one of the founders of the Polonia academic association at the university.

=== Medical career ===
After studies, from 1875 to 1879 he worked in Gdańsk, Chełmno, Greifswald and Jena. Afterwards he was running a private clinic in Chełmno. There he wrote many of his papers in the field of surgery.

In 1887 he was appointed to work at the surgery faculty at Jagiellonian University in Kraków. In 1897 he was asked to lead the new surgery faculty and clinic at Lwów University, to which he agreed.

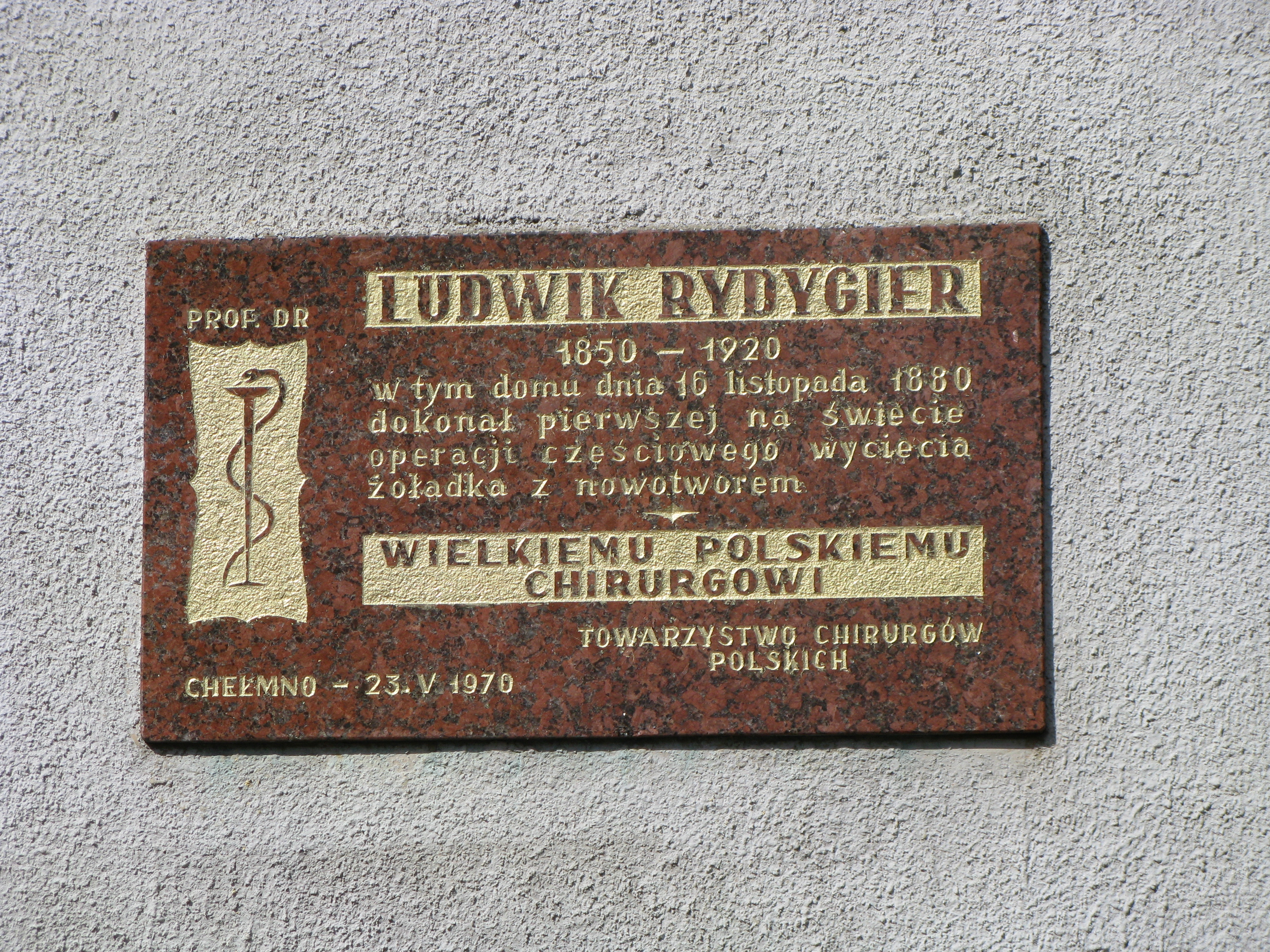
Former clinic of Ludwik Rydygier in Chełmno

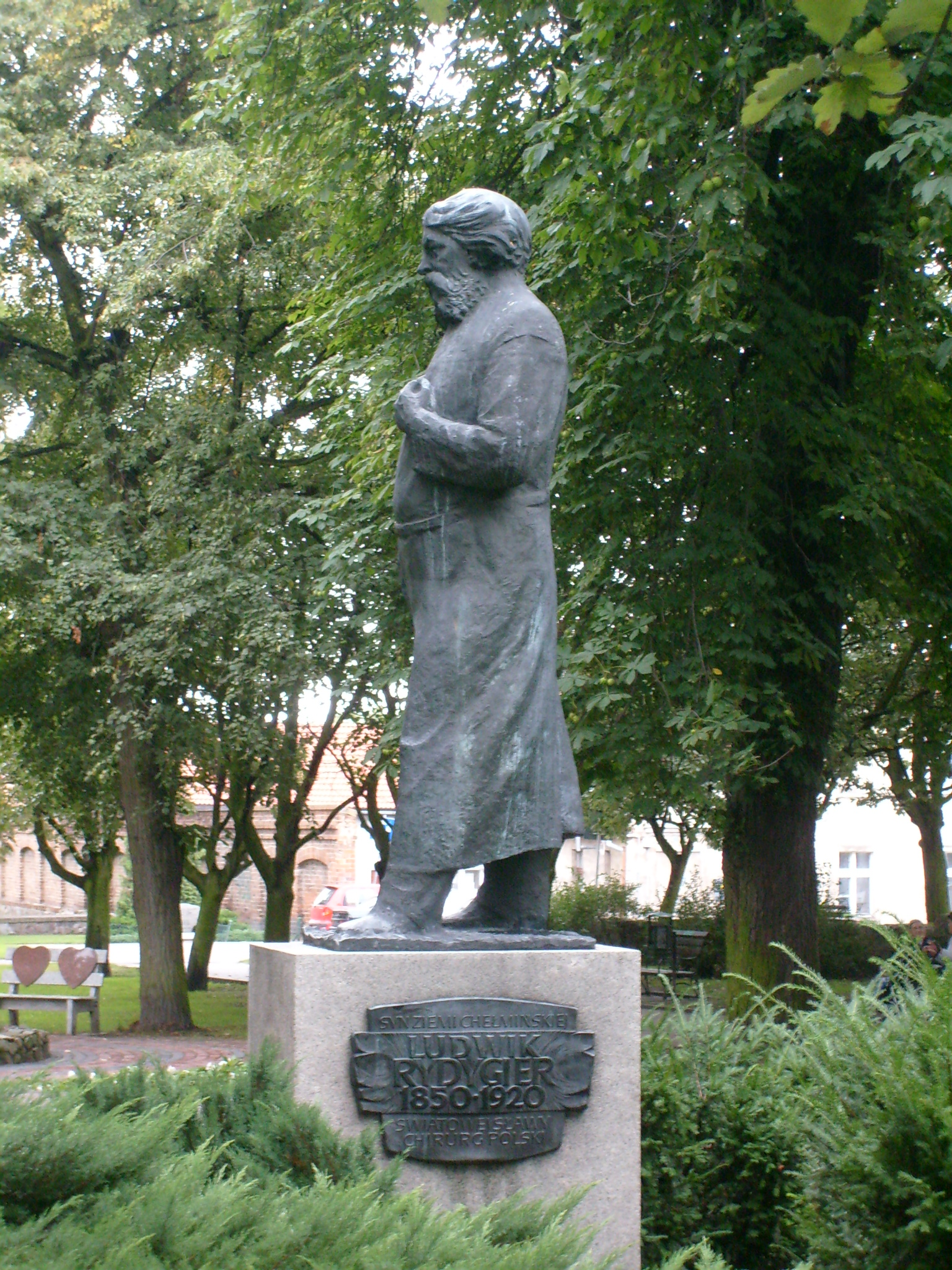
Monument of Ludwik Rydygier in Chełmno

He was at his time one of the most distinguished Polish and worldwide known surgeons. In 1880, as the first in Poland and second in the world he succeeded in surgical removal of the pylorus in a patient suffering from stomach cancer. He was also the first to document this procedure. In 1881, as the first in the world, he carried out a peptic ulcer resection. In 1884 he introduced a new method of surgical peptic ulcer treatment using Gastroenterostomy. Rydygier proposed (1900) original concepts for removing prostatic adenoma and introduced many other surgical techniques.

Due to Prussian harassment, in 1887, he renounced Prussian citizenship, and obtained Austrian citizenship, and sold his clinic in Chełmno to Leon Polewski, one of his employees (Rydygier already lived in the Austrian Partition of Poland). He was dean of the Medical Department and in the years 1901–1902 functioned as rector of Lwów University. He was mentor to many surgeons and future professors. In 1889 he organized the first surgical conference in Poland. These conferences led to the establishment of Polish Surgeon Society. He didn't leave Lwów, even when he was offered to move to Charles University in Prague. He was an outstanding surgeon, well known for his practical achievements, as well as initiator of new methods and a talented organizer. Some of his ideas, which include gastric surgeries, surgery of rectal cancer, amputations, plastic, orthopedic and cardiothoracic surgery and urology are successfully used to date.

=== Military service ===
During the First World War he led military hospital in Brno. After the war he immediately returned to Lwów, where he fought against Ukrainians in November 1918. He was promoted to general of Polish Army. In 1920 he started organizing military hospitals.

=== Death ===
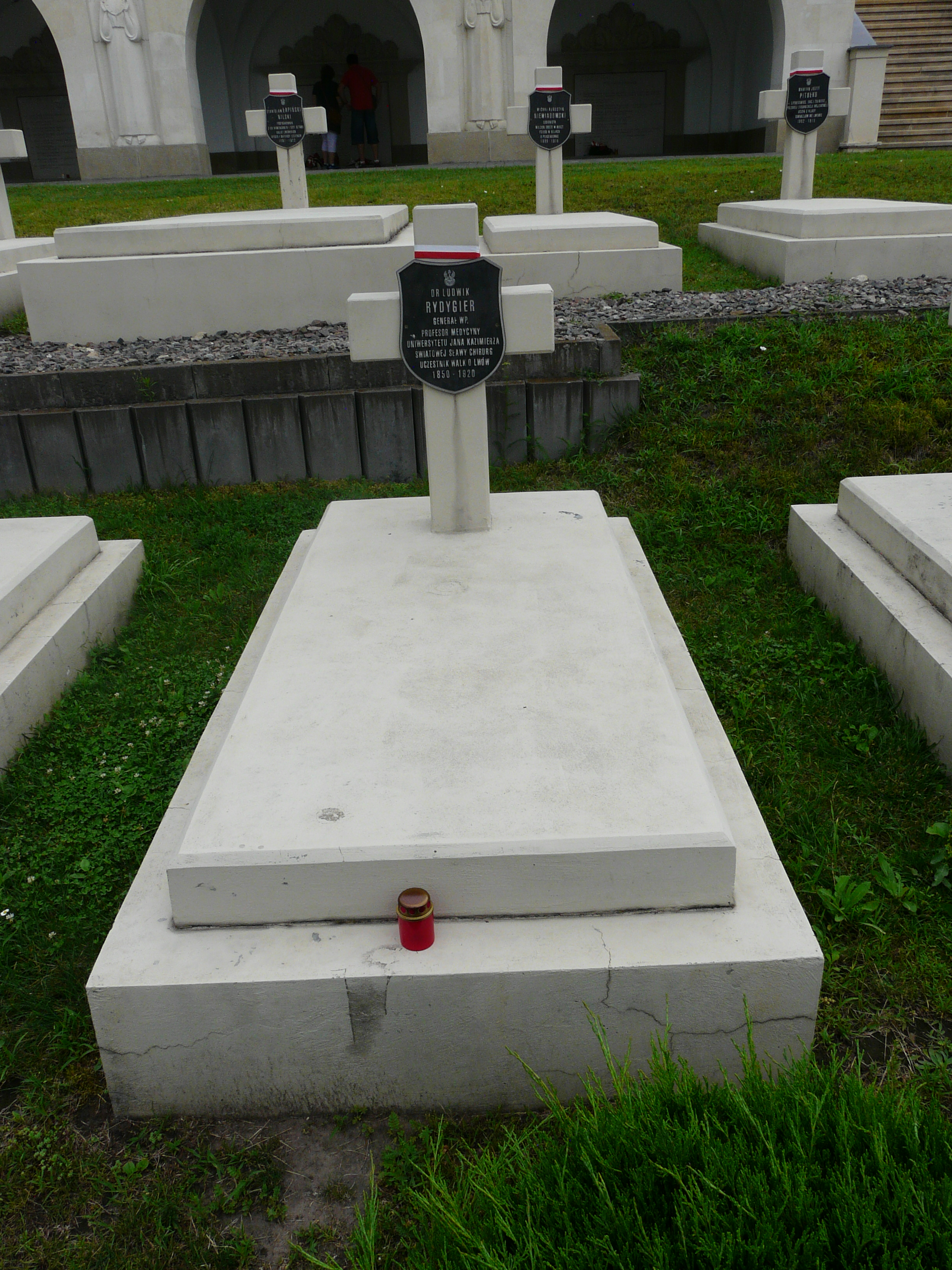
Grave of Ludwik Rydygier at the Cemetery of the Defenders of Lwów

He died that year suddenly. At first he was buried with military honors at the Łyczaków Cemetery, later his remains were moved to the officer part of Cemetery of the Defenders of Lwów.

== Legacy and remembrance ==
In 1899 in Lwów, Polish doctors celebrated the 25th anniversary of Ludwik Rydygier's scientific activity. A monument of Ludwik Rydygier was unveiled in Chełmno in 1984. Numerous hospitals in Poland are named after him, including in Kraków, Częstochowa, Toruń, Łódź, Suwałki. Also the Nicolaus Copernicus University Ludwik Rydygier Collegium Medicum in Bydgoszcz and a lecture hall of the Medical University of Gdańsk bear his name.

== See also ==
- Timeline of Polish science and technology
