= Łasin =

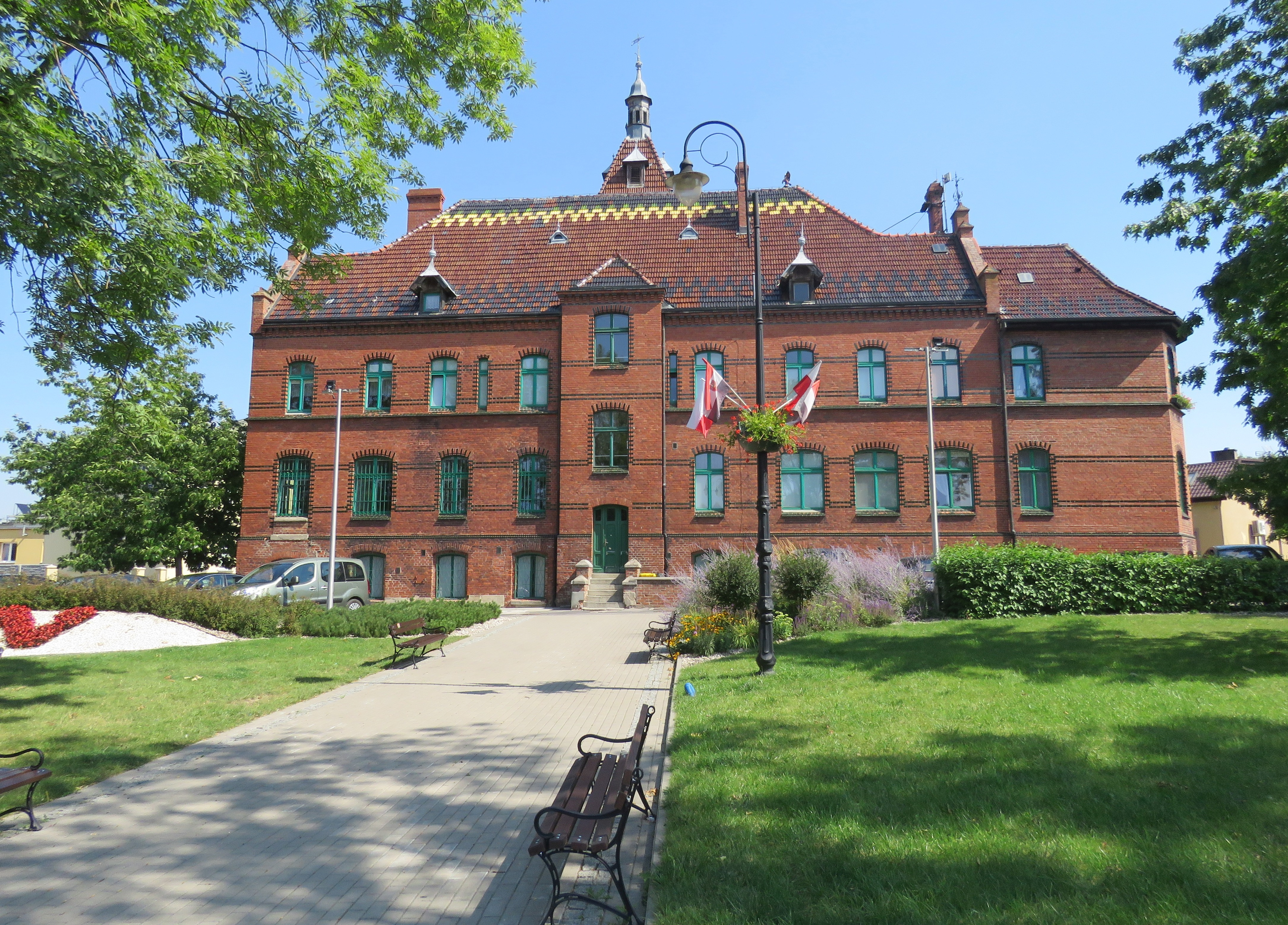
- Łasin Town Hall

- Flag Coat of arms

- Location within Poland
- Coordinates: 53°30′59″N 19°5′24″E
- Country: Poland
- Voivodeship: Kuyavian-Pomeranian
- County: Grudziądz
- Gmina: Łasin
- Town rights: 1298

Area
  - Total: 4.79 km^{2} (1.85 sq mi)

Population (2025)
  - Total: 3,004
  - Density: 627/km^{2} (1,620/sq mi)
- Time zone: UTC+1 (CET)
  - Summer (DST): UTC+2 (CEST)
- Postal code: 86-320
- Vehicle registration: CGR
- Website: http://www.lasin.pl/

Łasin [ˈwaɕin] is a town in Grudziądz County, Kuyavian-Pomeranian Voivodeship, in northern Poland, with 3,004 inhabitants (2025). It is the seat of the gmina (administrative district) called Gmina Łasin. It is located within the historic Chełmno Land.

== History ==
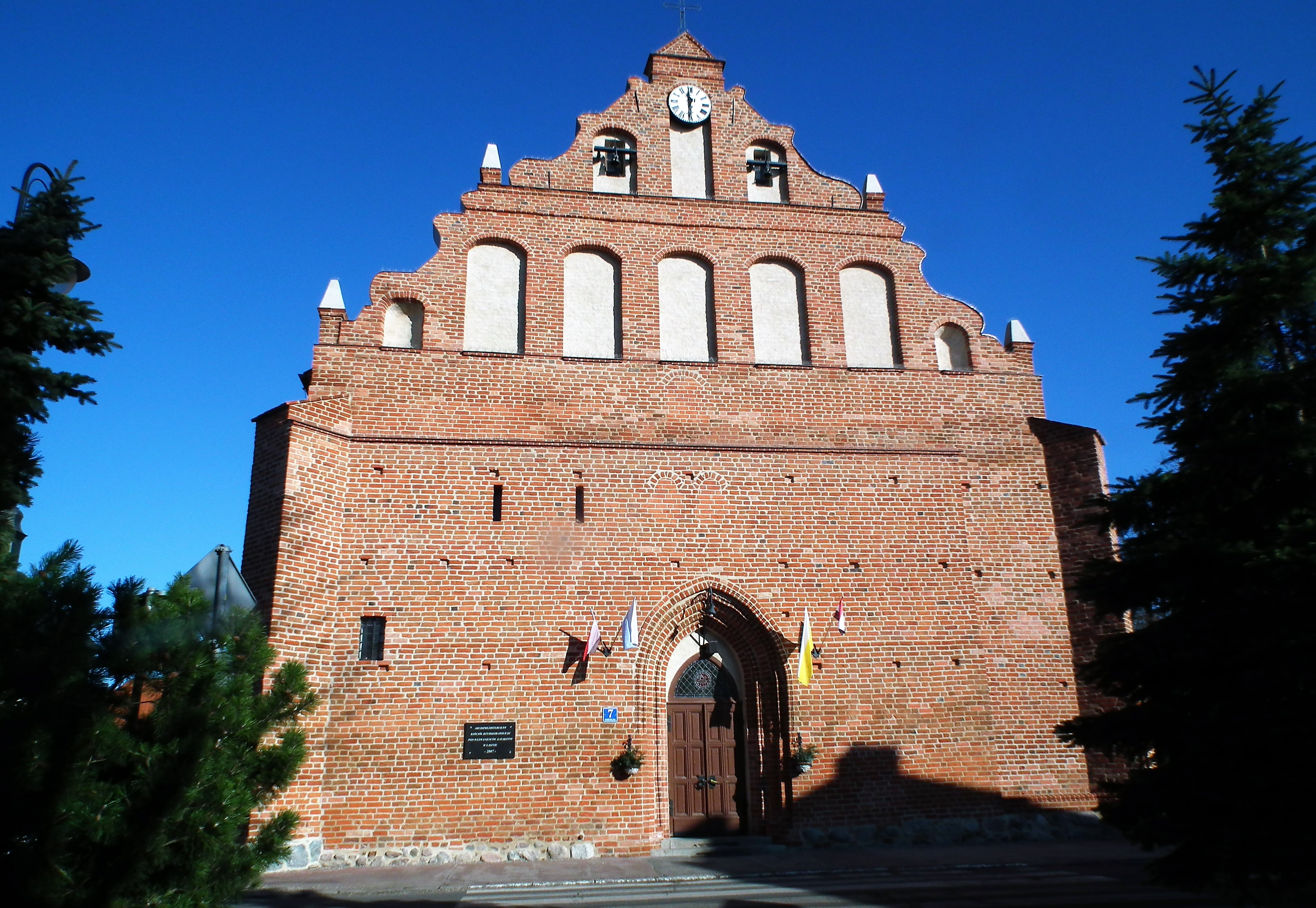
Gothic Saint Catherine church

The history of Łasin dates back to the rule of first Polish King Bolesław I the Brave. Polish brothers Mateusz and Jakub owned land near the Łasinka River (Łasin). In the year 1298, it was taken from them by the Country Master of the Teutonic Order Meinhard von Querfurt and given to Jan de Nemore, who founded the village of Łasin. Also in 1298, the town received Magdeburg law town rights from the monastic state of the Teutonic Knights in which it was located. In the 14th century, papal verdicts ordered the restoration of the territory to Poland, however, the Teutonic Knights did not comply and continued to occupy it.

In 1454, King Casimir IV Jagiellon reincorporated the Chełmno Land into the Kingdom of Poland upon the request of the Prussian Confederation, however, Łasin itself was captured by Poles in 1461 during the subsequent Thirteen Years' War. After the war, in 1466, the Teutonic Knights renounced claims to the town, and recognized it as part of Poland. Administratively it was located in the Chełmno Voivodeship in the provinces of Royal Prussia and Greater Poland.

Following the First Partition of Poland in 1772, the town, as Lessen, was annexed by King Frederick the Great and made part of the Kingdom of Prussia. In 1871, with the Prussian-led unification of Germany, it became part of the German Empire. It belonged to the Graudenz district in the Prussian Province of West Prussia. According to the census of 1871, the town had a population of 2,385, of which 1,390 (58.3%) were Poles.

After the end of World War I, in 1920, in accordance with the Treaty of Versailles, Łasin became part of the Second Polish Republic, after it regained independence in 1918. In interwar Poland, the mayor of Łasin was Stefan Tomczyński, a Polish activist and efficient administrator, who was previously harassed by Prussians for pro-Polish activity in the Prussian Partition.

During the German occupation of Poland (World War II), in October 1939, the Selbstschutz carried out several mass executions of Polish inhabitants of Łasin and its surroundings, killing 150 people.

== Culture ==
A museum dedicated to firefighting (Muzeum Pożarnictwa Ziemi Pomorskiej) is located in Łasin.

== Sports ==
Piast Łasin sports club is based in Łasin, with football, table tennis and powerlifting sections.

== Gallery ==
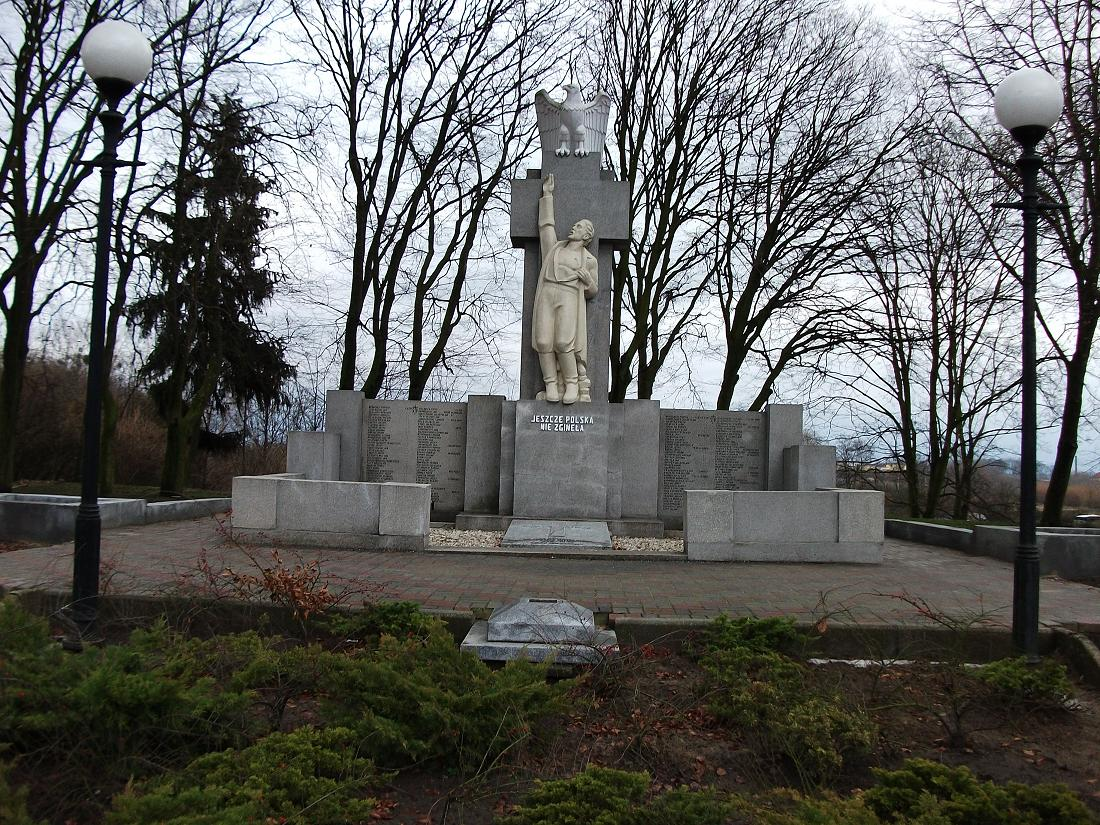
Monument to Poles murdered by the Nazis in 1939

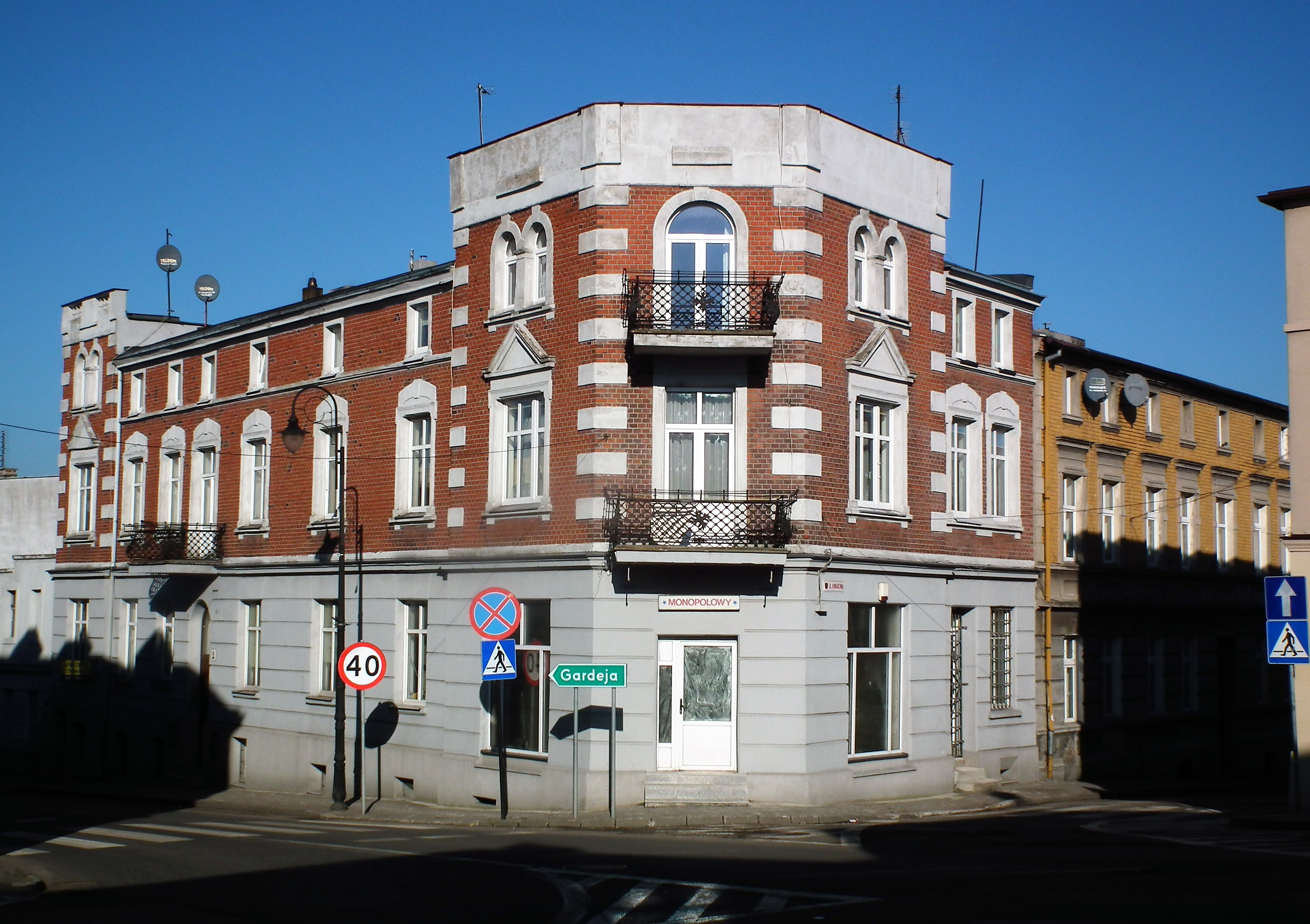
Old townhouses

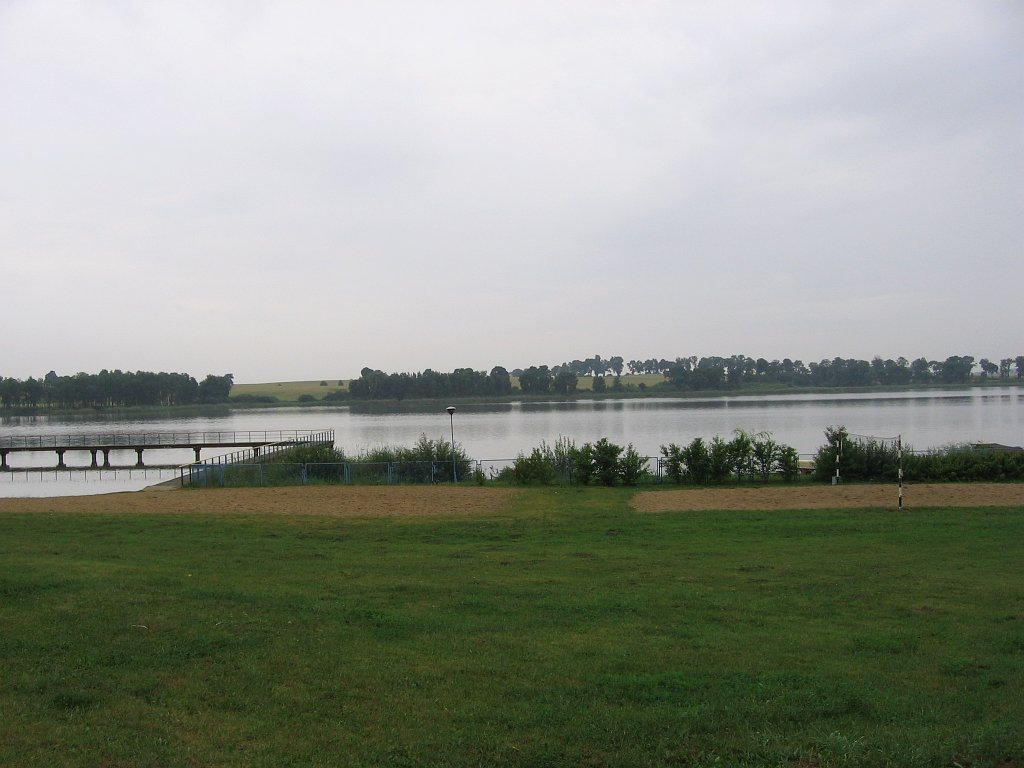
Łasin Lake

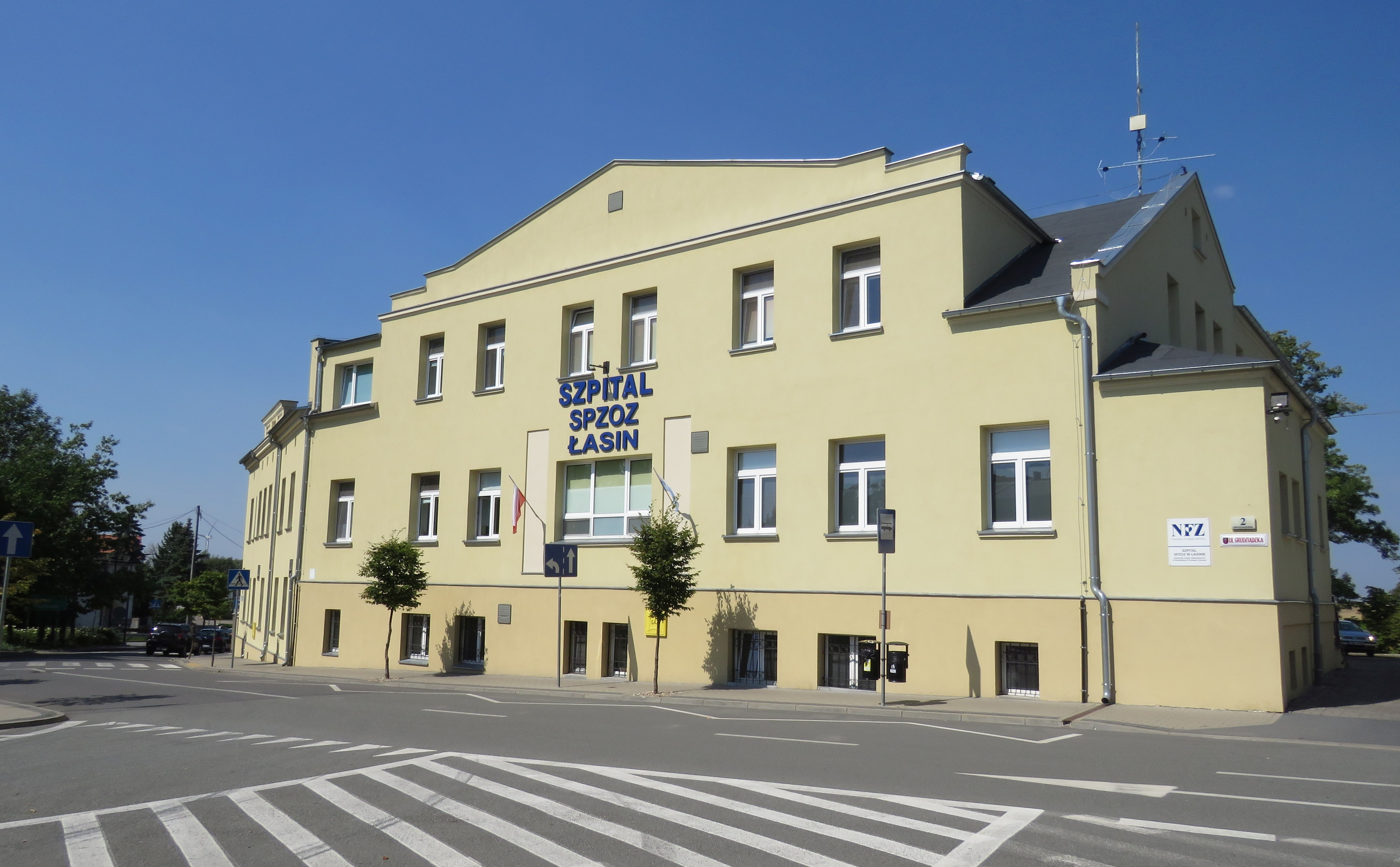
Hospital

== Notable people ==
- Zbigniew Dębski (1922–2010), Polish military officer, member of the Home Army and participant of the Warsaw Uprising
- Heiner Stadler (1942–2018), jazz composer and musician
