= Sanatorium in Smukała =

Hospital in Bydgoszcz, Poland

Coordinates: 53°11′09″N 17°56′54″E

- Sanatorium w Smukale
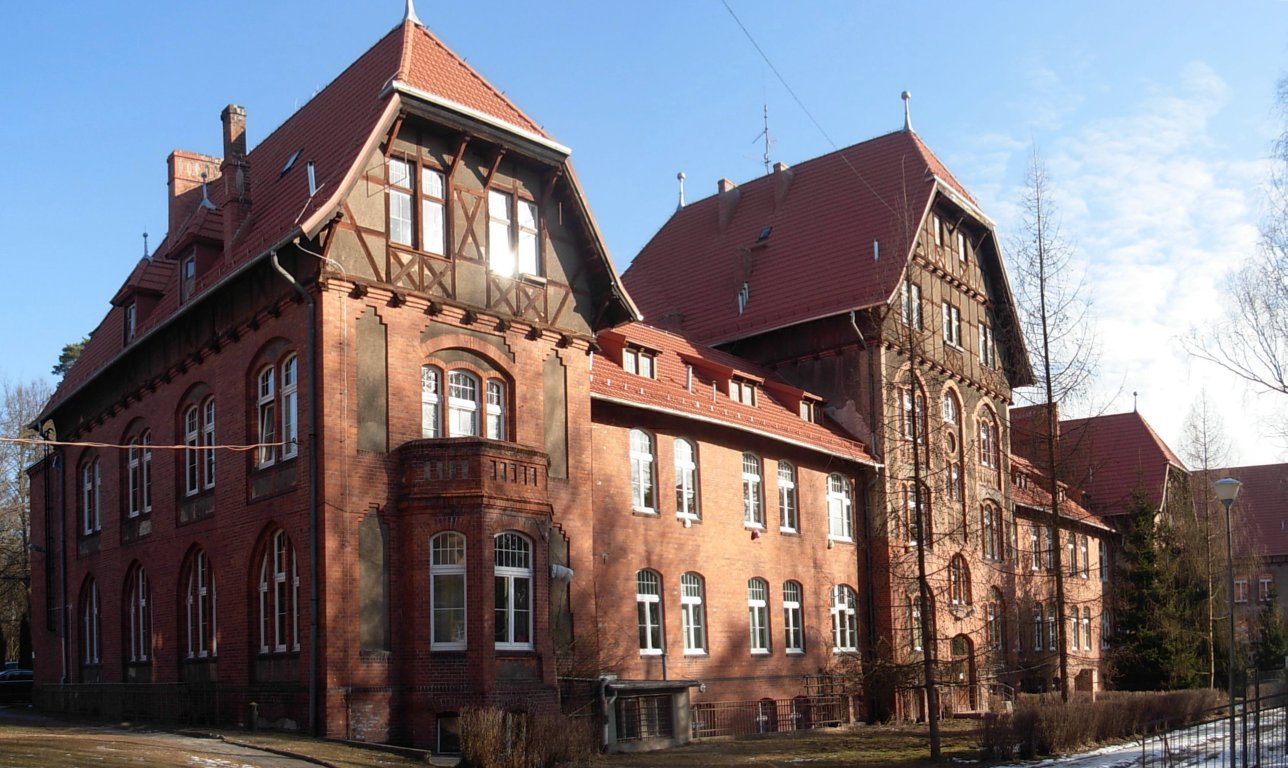
- Sanatorium, Smukała Sanatorium in Smukała (Poland) Sanatorium in Smukała (Kuyavian-Pomeranian Voivodeship)
- Interactive map of the Sanatorium in Smukała area

General information
- Type: Sanatorium
- Architectural style: Eclecticism in architecture, neo-Gothic elements
- Location: Smukała district, Bydgoszcz, Poland, 9 Meysnera street, 85-472 Bydgoszcz
- Current tenants: Kuyavian-Pomeranian Voivodeship
- Construction started: 1901
- Inaugurated: 1904

Design and construction
- Engineer: Franz Julius Knüpfer (design), Carl Meyer (engineer)

Website
- kpcp.pl

The Sanatorium in Smukała is a hospital for pulmonary diseases located in the district of Smukała in Bydgoszcz, Poland. Located in a conifer forest, it operated as an independent institution between 1904 and 2000, before being integrated into the structures of the Kuyavian-Pomeranian Center of Pulmonology.

== History ==
=== Prussian period ===
On May 24, 1901, the "Association of the Province of Posen for Combating Tuberculosis as a Social Disease" (Polish: Stowarzyszenia do Walki z Gruźlicą jako Chorobą Społeczną Prowincji Poznańskiej) took the decision to construct a tuberculosis (TB) sanatorium for women in the village of Smukała, close to Bydgoszcz. In doing so, it followed Dr. Hermann Brehmer's precept to fight TB with a systematic open-air treatment.

The site selected for the construction of the clinic was an 80-year-old pine forest near the Bromberg/Bydgoszcz-Wyrzysk railway, some 7 kilometres (4.3 mi) north of Bydgoszcz. The project was commissioned to Carl Meyer, then municipal building counselor.

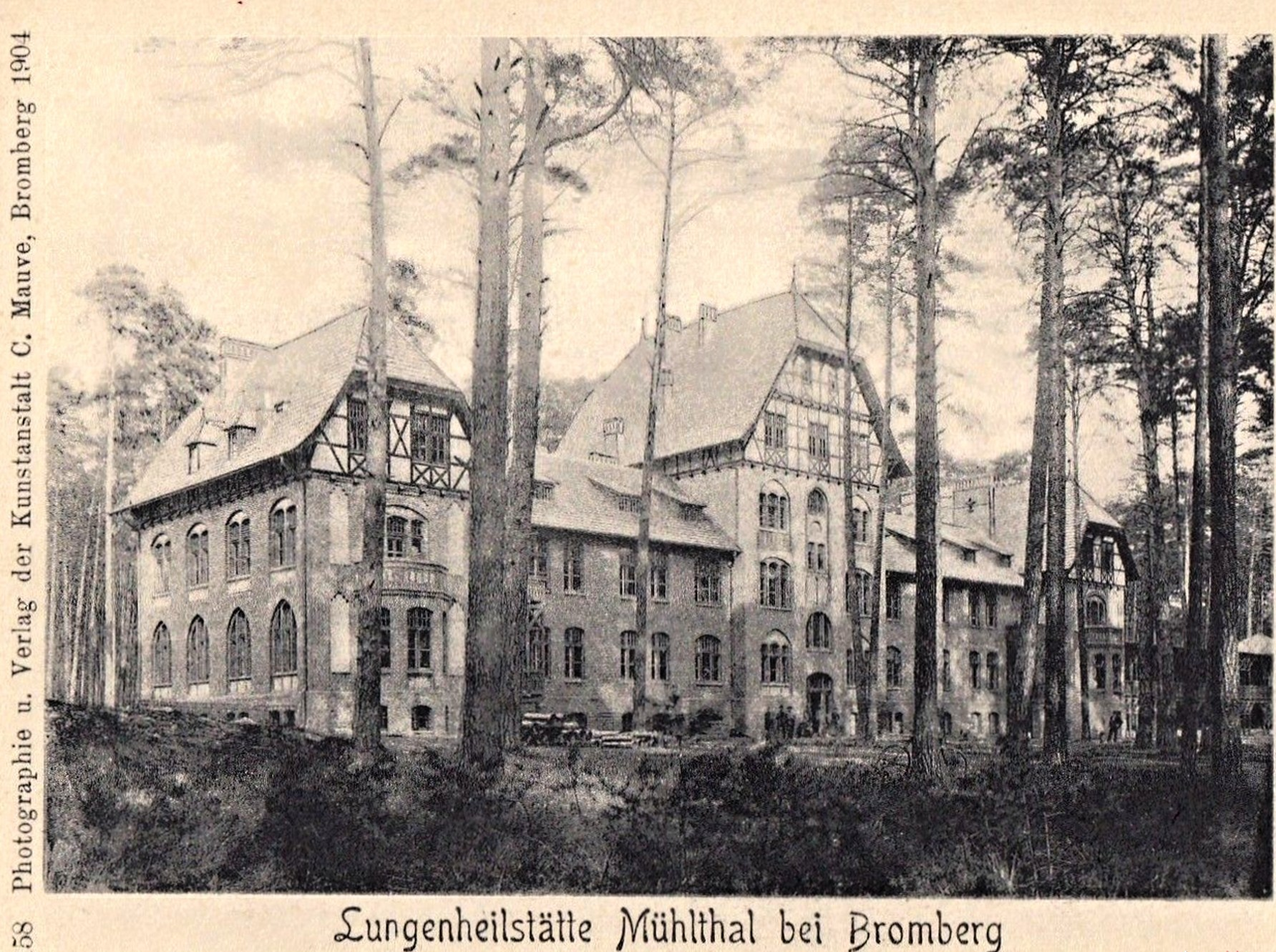
Smukala Sanatorium, ca 1904

At the time, it was the second institution of this type in the then-Prussian Province of Posen; the first sanatorium pavilion (for men) was established in 1903 in Kowanówko, (Kronprinz Wilhelm-Volksheilstätte-English: Crown Prince Wilhelm Sanatorium) in the west of the province. In 1906, another clinic, for children, (Prinz Wilhelm Kinderheilstätte-English: Prince Wilhelm children's sanatorium), opened in Inowrocław, in temporary barracks.

The design comprised a two-level main building with a storage room and a smaller utility building with a caretaker's apartment. The project was carried out between 1903 and 1904. The sanatorium facility was organized taking into accounts the specific needs and constraints of this type of facilities (location, natural surroundings, railway proximity, access to clean water, etc.).

The 80-bed sanatorium opened on October 20, 1904, while the official opening only took place on June 6, 1905. On this occasion, the German Emperor Wilhelm II sent an official telegram of congratulation and the architect Carl Meyer was awarded the Order of the Red Eagle, 4th class.

In February 1906, it was decided to expand the complex capacity to 120 beds. As a consequence, an additional wing, connected to the main complex, was built on the eastern side of the main building in 1907. At the same time, improvements were made to the complex (set up of an electric generator).

In 1908, 5,000 trees were planted in the vicinity of the clinic: elms, poplars, linden trees, birches and black locusts. The same year, a villa was erected for the director of the sanatorium, who until that time used to live in Bromberg/Bydgoszcz.

In October 1911, a foundation was established for the construction of a children's sanatorium, for which 5 hectares (12 acres) of land were purchased. On October 16, 1913, the project ended with the opening of the "Bertha Amelie-Stiftung children's sanatorium" (German: Kinderheilstätte der Bertha Amelie-Stiftung), named after Bertha Amelia, the founder's mother. This new building was designed by Franz Julius Knüpfer from Berlin, while the overall project was still supervised by Carl Meyer. In 1914, the sanatorium complex could accommodate 200 patients and admitted people without distinction of sex and age.

The patients came from the entire Prussian Poland but mainly from the Posen and Bromberg administrative regions.

=== Interwar period ===
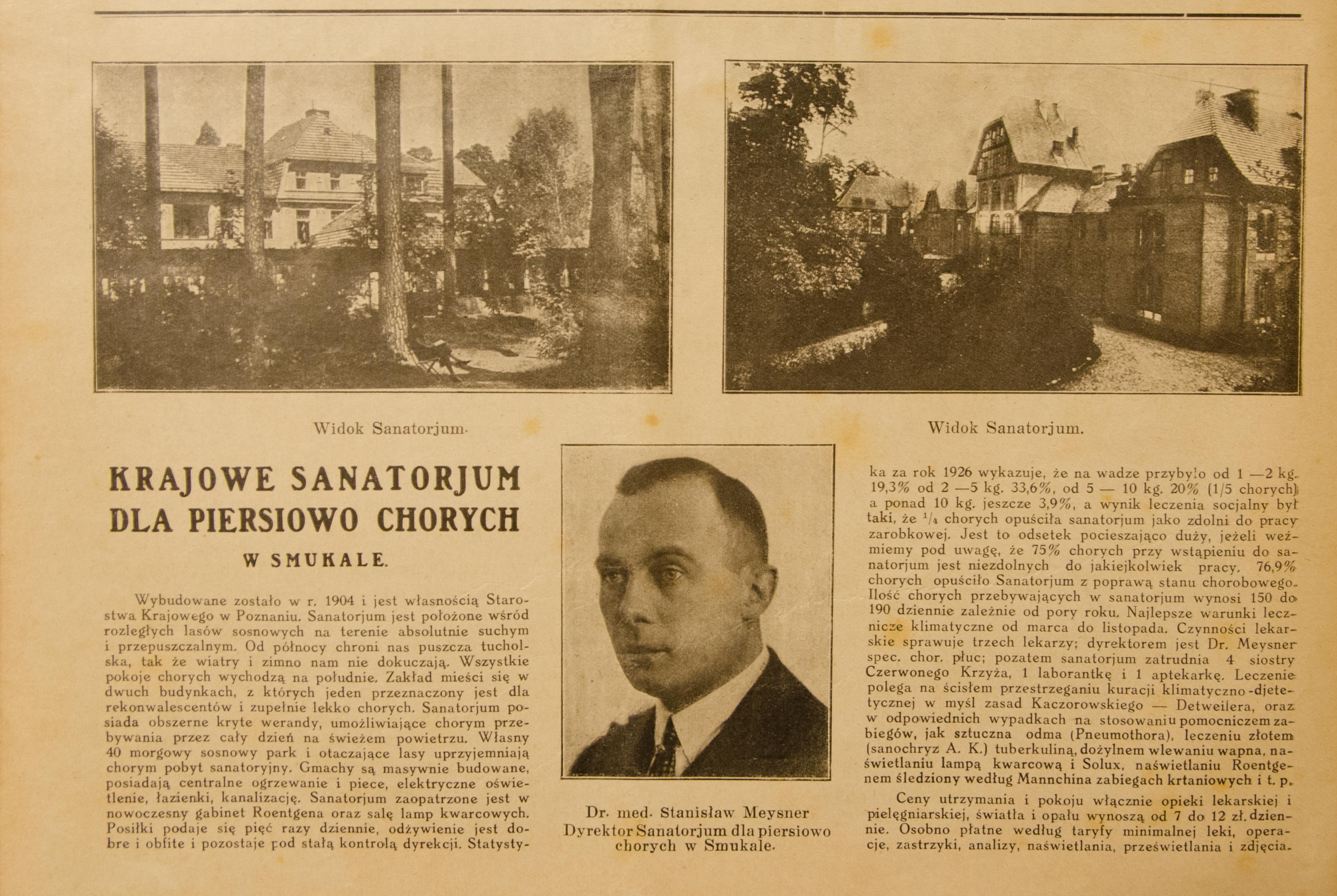
Polish article about the sanatorium in 1927

In 1920, the sanatorium was taken over by the Polish authorities. The entire facility moved under the responsibility of the "Society for Combating Tuberculosis", seated in Poznań. Its first director was Dr. Franciszek Czajkowski then from 1926 Dr. Stanisław Meysner. The latter introduced new preventive treatment methods against tuberculosis, collapsing pneumothorax and peritoneum.

In the 1930s, the sanatorium was partaken into two wards:

- the main building, equipped with 139 beds and a surgery section, housed the more severely ill;
- the 41-bed pavilion welcomed less severe patients.

At this period, the sanatorium was considered one of the best in the country. Many well-known physiologists worked there, among whom Dr. Władysław Baranowski, who became afterwards director of the Pulmonary Hospital in Bydgoszcz.

=== Second World War ===
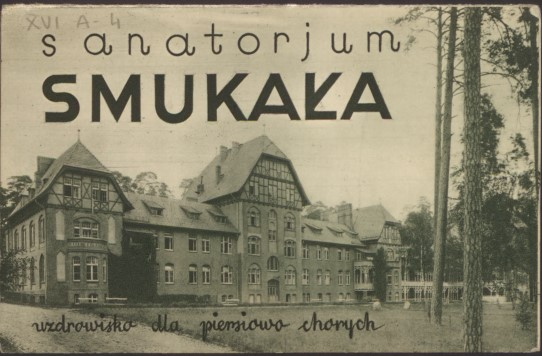
Advert about the Sanatorium in Smukala (1936)

During World War II, the sanatorium kept operating. However, the centre was not available to Polish citizen.

=== Post war PRLperiod ===
After the war, newer treatments against tuberculosis were introduced, using mass vaccination. Dr. Meysner resumed his activity as director of the clinic: in 1948, the hospital had a capacity of 165 beds and employed 60 employees.

In 1949, the facility was nationalized and changed its name to "Henryk Dobrzycki's Sanatorium Against Tuberculosis" (Polish: Sanatorium Przeciwgruźlicze im. Henryka Dobrzyckiego). At that time, the clinic was used as a showcase in the Bydgoszcz Province, like a health care Potemkin village, regularly visited by high representatives of the Polish People's Republic administration. In March 1946, the facility was even toured by doctors from Moscow.

After Meyser's death in 1952, the level of medical services steadily decreased and the training and scientific role of the facility was taken over by the Tuberculosis Hospital in Bydgoszcz. The 1960s were marked by new administrative decisions, which improved the social conditions of employees and the economic situation of the unit. The construction of a residential building and a nursing hotel started, and the auxiliary farm was expanded. Thanks to the introduction of new anti-TB drugs, modern pharmacotherapy of tuberculosis were applied.

In 1975, it became part of the "Anti-Tuberculosis Specialist Health Care Center in Bydgoszcz", seated at today's 2 Gimnazjalna street.

In the post-war period, with the development of modern pharmacotherapy against tuberculosis, the traditional treatment in sanatorium lost gradually its importance Instead, new procedures were introduced, such as cardiothoracic surgery or pulmonary reconstruction.

=== Recent years ===
In the 1990s, the initial functions of the medical pavilions were changed: utility rooms were extended and apartments for nurses were built.

Since 2000, along with the reorganization of the health service, the sanatorium facility has been incorporated into the network of the Kuyavian-Pomeranian Center of Pulmonology in Bydgoszcz. The building have also been re-affected:

- the main edifice now shelter the pulmonary reconstruction service and the tuberculosis and lung diseases branch;
- the women's pavilion was transformed into a 40-bed pulmonary tuberculosis ward.

Modern rehabilitation equipment was also purchased for lung-related therapy. In 2023, decision was made to completely renovate the centre, to add specialist rehabilitation wards, a palliative care facility and a home for the elderly. Some of the edifices will be rebuilt, extended and adapted to the new functions. Revitalization of the former sanatorium park on an area of approximately 4.5 hectares (11 acres) is also planned. The renovation program is funded by the "European Funds for the Kuyavian-Pomeranian Voivodeship 2021-2027".

=== Name ===
- 1905, official opening: Kronprinzessin Cecilie Frauenheilstätte Mühltahl bei Bromberg - English: Crown Princess Cecilie's women sanatorium of Muhltal near Bromberg. "Muhltal" was the Prussian name of Smukała.
- 1906–1920: Kronprinzessin Cecilie Lungenheilstätte in Mühlthal - English: Crown Princess Cecilie sanatorium in Mühlthal.
- 1920–1929: Krajowa Lecznica dla Piersiowo Chorych w Smukale – English: National Clinic for Chest Patients in Smukała.
- 1929–1945: Wojewódzkie Sanatorium dla Piersiowo Chorych w Smukale pod Bydgoszczą – English: Provincial Sanatorium for Chest Patients in Smukała near Bydgoszcz.
- 1945–1949: Sanatorium Przeciwgruźlicze Samorządu Województwa Pomorskiego w Smukale – English: Pomeranian Voivodeship Antituberculosis Sanatorium in Smukała.
- 1949–2000: Sanatorium Przeciwgruźlicze im. Henryka Dobrzyckiego – English: Henryk Dobrzycki's Sanatorium Against Tuberculosis.
- From 2000: Kujawsko-Pomorskie Centrum Pulmonologii w Bydgoszczy – jednostka w Smukale – English: Kujawsko-Pomorskie Pulmonology Centre in Bydgoszcz - Smukała unit.

== Characteristics ==
The sanatorium is part of the Kujawsko-Pomorskie Pulmonology Center in Bydgoszcz. In the 1904 historic buildings, the following services can be found:

- Physical Medicine and Rehabilitation (PM&R) Department;
- Pulmonary PM&R Department;
- Department of Neurological PM&R;
- Tuberculosis and Lung Diseases Department.

Outpatient procedures are not performed in the facility. The clinic receives as well patients from chronic lung disease, bronchitis, bronchial asthma, lung cancer and people recovering after surgery.

The facility includes 25 hectares (62 acres) of pine forest.

== Architecture ==
The clinic complex displays eclectic style with elements of Neo-Gothic and historicism.

The ensemble is characterised by a massive body, with a central part flanked by two wings, each element being covered with a Half hip roof.

The top floors boast wattle and daub elements in contrast with the lower levels. The facades are adorned with bay window and avant-corps made of brick. In addition, one can notice on the southern elevation verandas, balconies and tall bifora or triforium windows: this was the location of the patient rooms (bedrooms and common rooms).

== Gallery ==
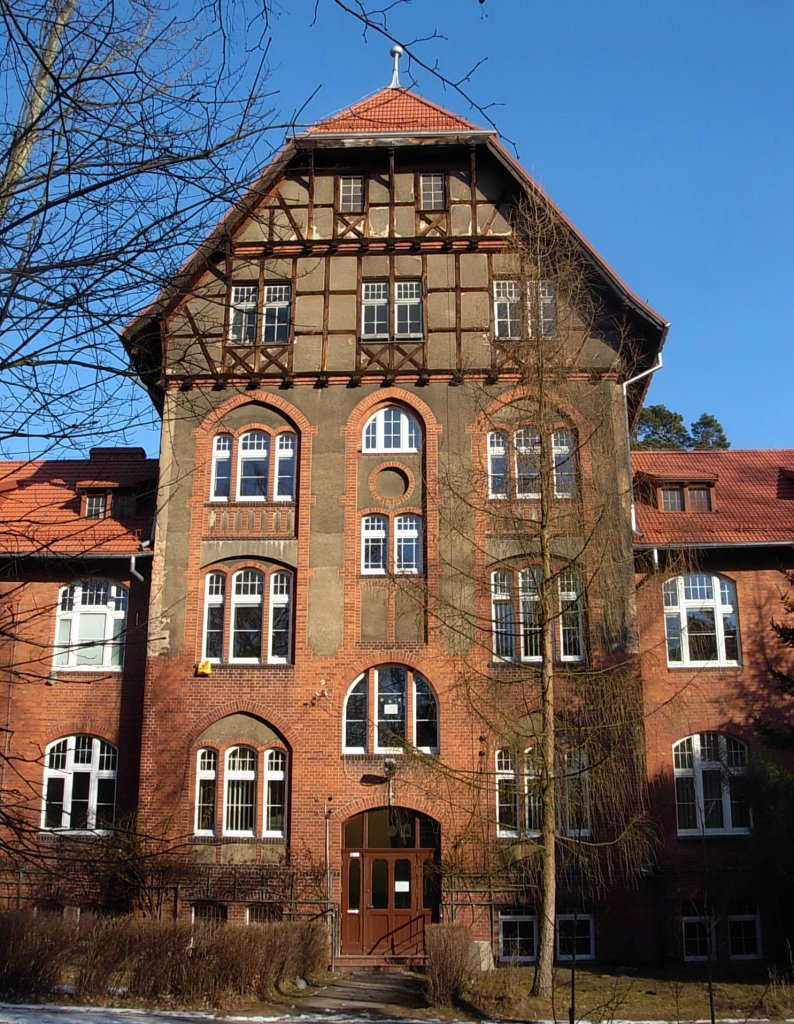
Avant-corps of the main building

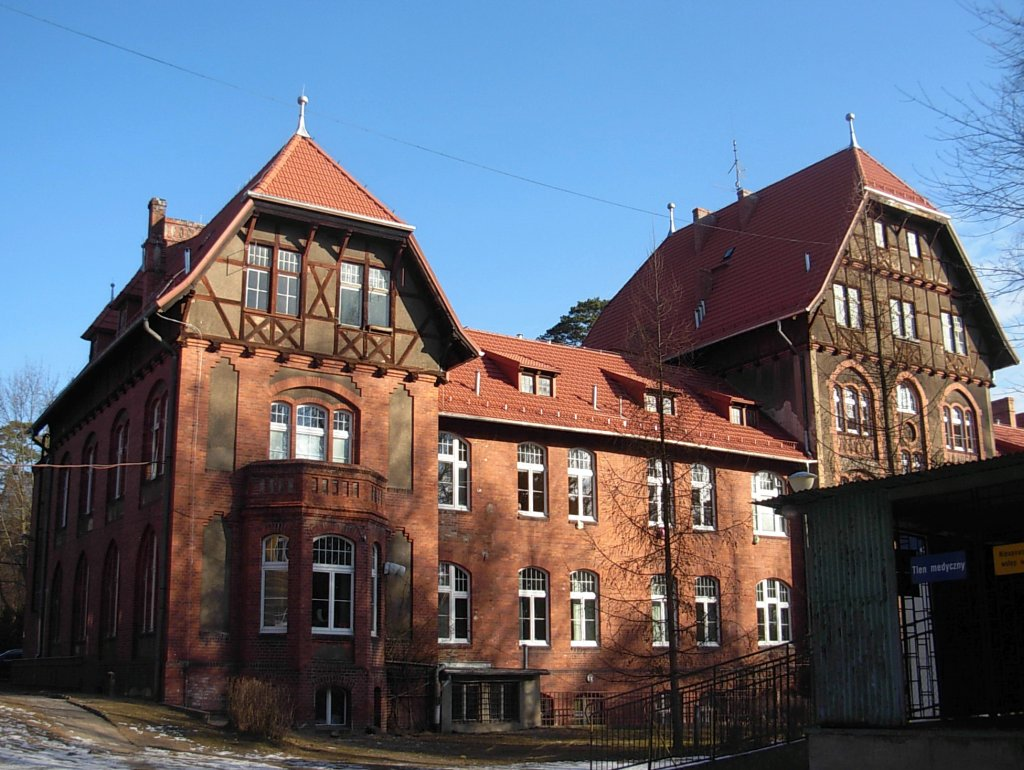
View of a wing

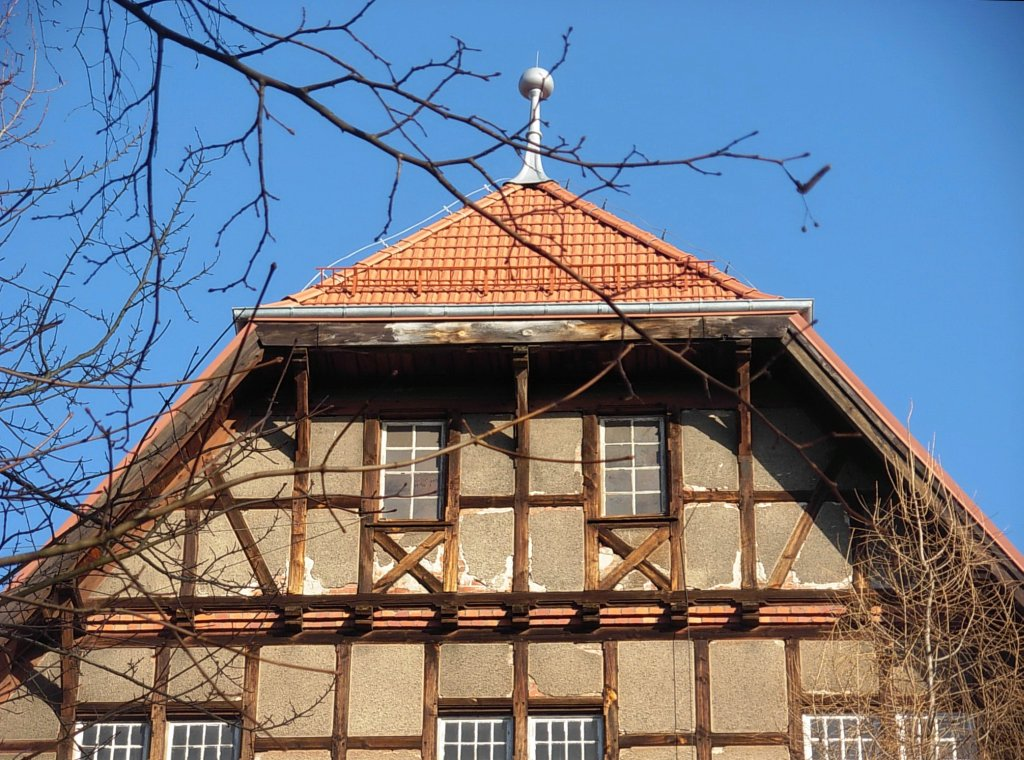
Half-hip roof

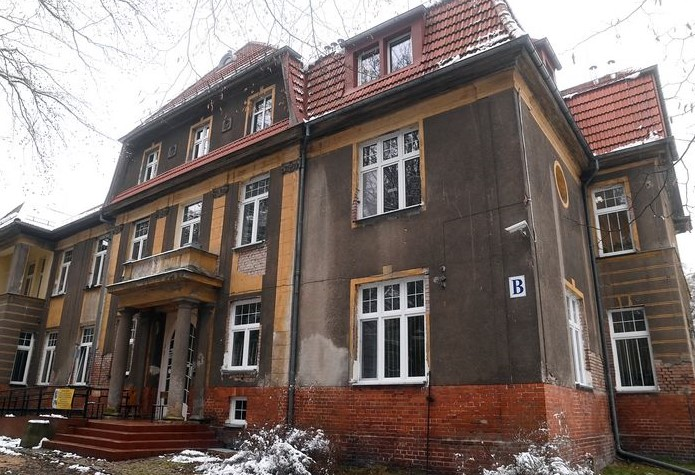
Children building

== See also ==
- Bydgoszcz
- Physical medicine and rehabilitation

== Bibliography ==
- Korpalska, Walentyna (2004). Sanatorium Przeciwgruźlicze w Smukale kolo Bydgoszczy. Z dziejów walki z gruźlicą na przełomie XIX i XX w. Kronika Bydgoska XXVI [The tuberculosis sanatorium in Smukała near Bydgoszcz. From the history of the fight against tuberculosis at the turn of the 19th and 20th centuries. Bydgoszcz Chronicles 26] (in Polish). Bydgoszcz: Towarzystwo Miłosnikow Miasta Bydgoszczy - Bydgoskie Towarzystwo Naukowe. pp. 309–316.
- Bręczewska-Kulesza, Daria (2001). Historia i architektura sanatorium dla plucnochorych w bydgoskiej Smukale. Materiały do dziejow kultury i sztuki bydgoszczy i regionu Z.6 [History and architecture of a sanatorium for pulmonary patients in Smukała in Bydgoszcz. Materials for the history of culture and art in Bydgoszcz and the region T.6] (in Polish). Bydgoszcz: Pracownia dokumentacji i popularyzacji zabytków wojewódzkiego ośrodka kultury w Bydgoszczy. pp. 57–77.
