= Dusocin =

- Village
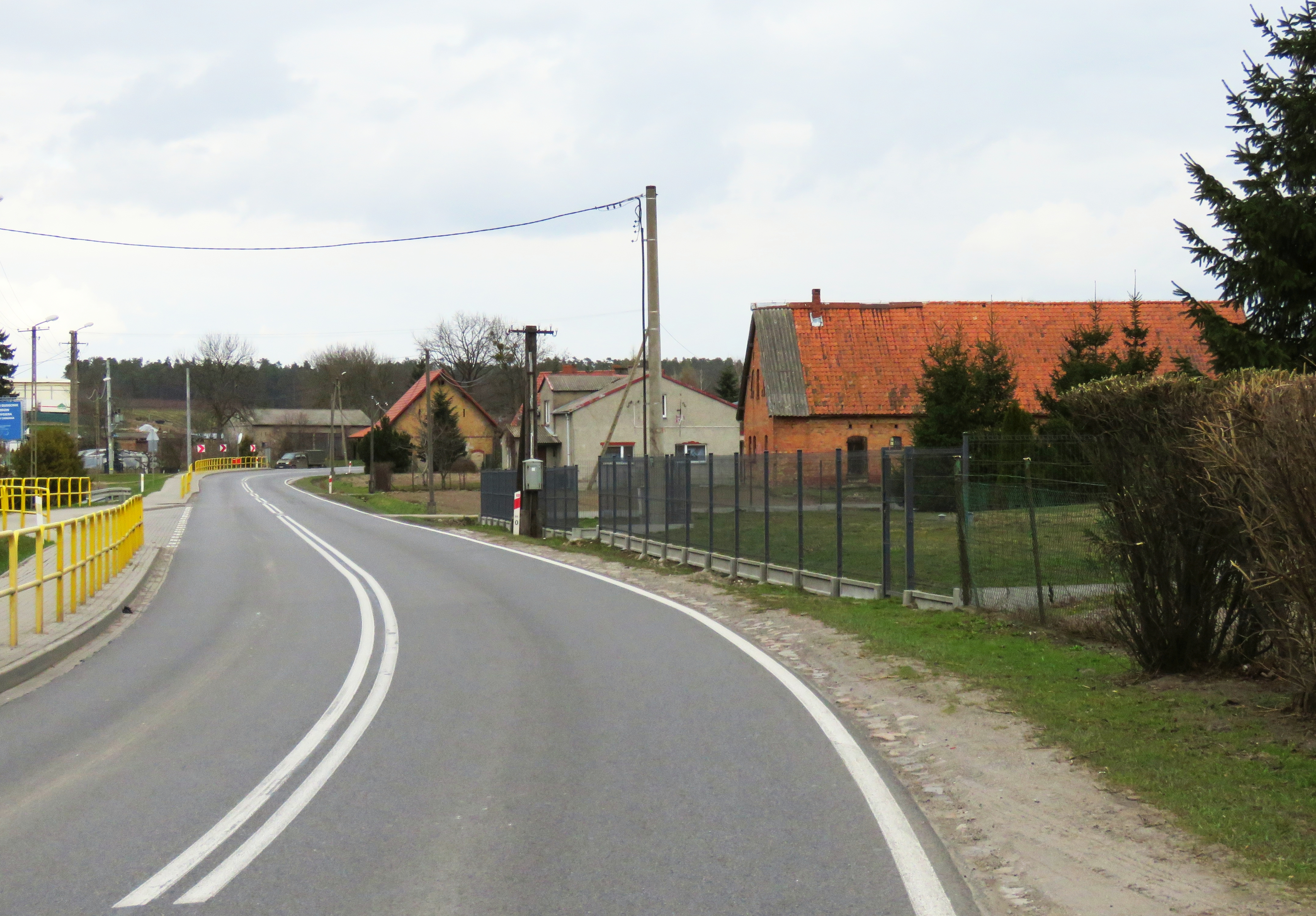

- Location within Poland
- Coordinates: 53°35′N 18°52′E
- Country: Poland
- Voivodeship: Kuyavian-Pomeranian
- County: Grudziądz
- Gmina: Grudziądz
- Time zone: UTC+1 (CET)
  - Summer (DST): UTC+2 (CEST)
- Vehicle registration: CGR

Dusocin [duˈsɔt͡ɕin] is a village in the administrative district of Gmina Grudziądz, within Grudziądz County, Kuyavian-Pomeranian Voivodeship, in north-central Poland. It is located in the Chełmno Land in the historic region of Pomerania.

During the German occupation of Poland (World War II), in 1939, some Polish farmers from Dusocin were murdered by the Germans in the Białochowo massacre in the nearby village of Białochowo (see Nazi crimes against the Polish nation).

== Notable residents ==
- Ludwik Rydygier (1850–1920), Polish surgeon
