= Alfred Biesiadecki =

Polish pathologist

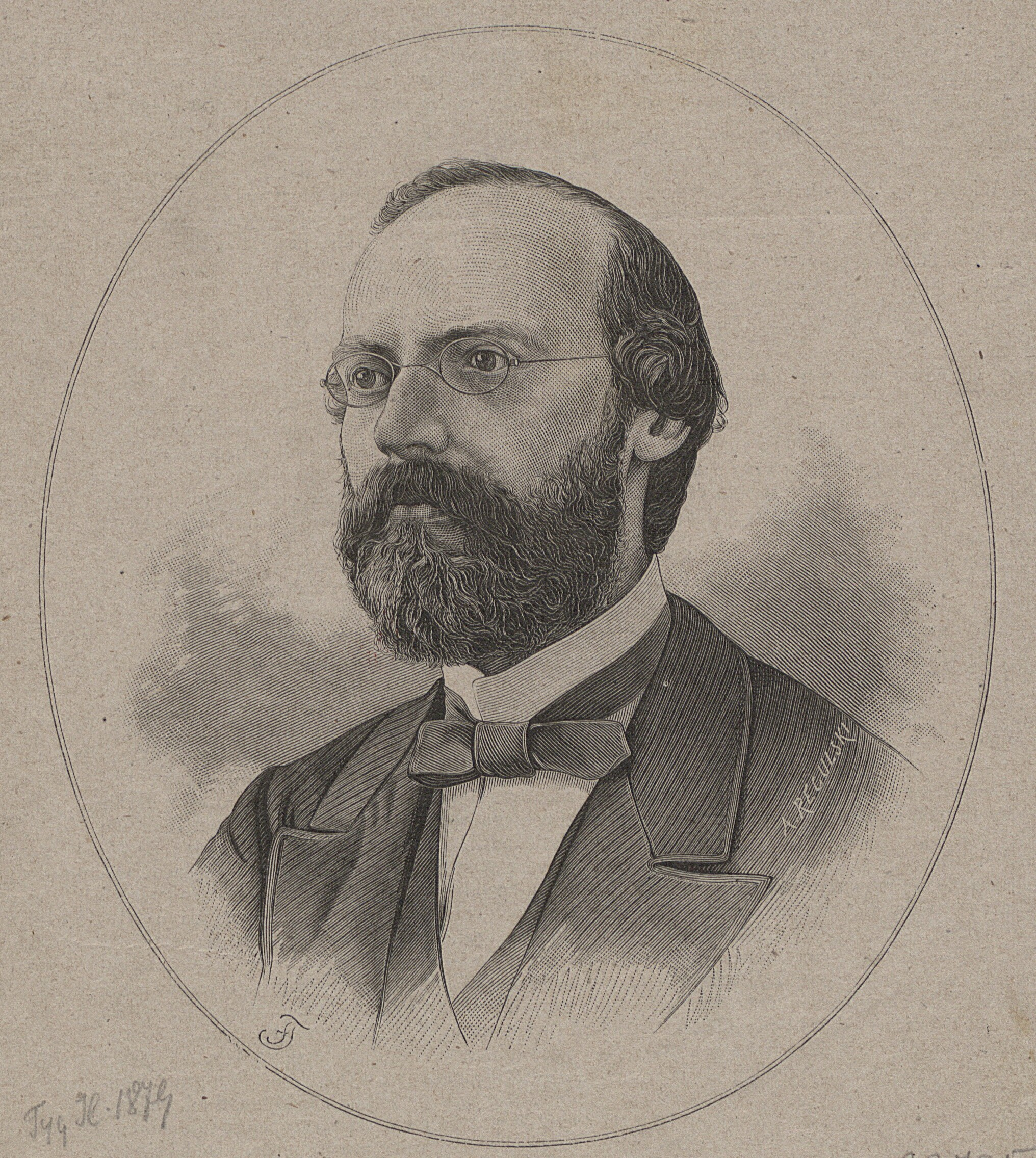
Alfred Biesiadecki

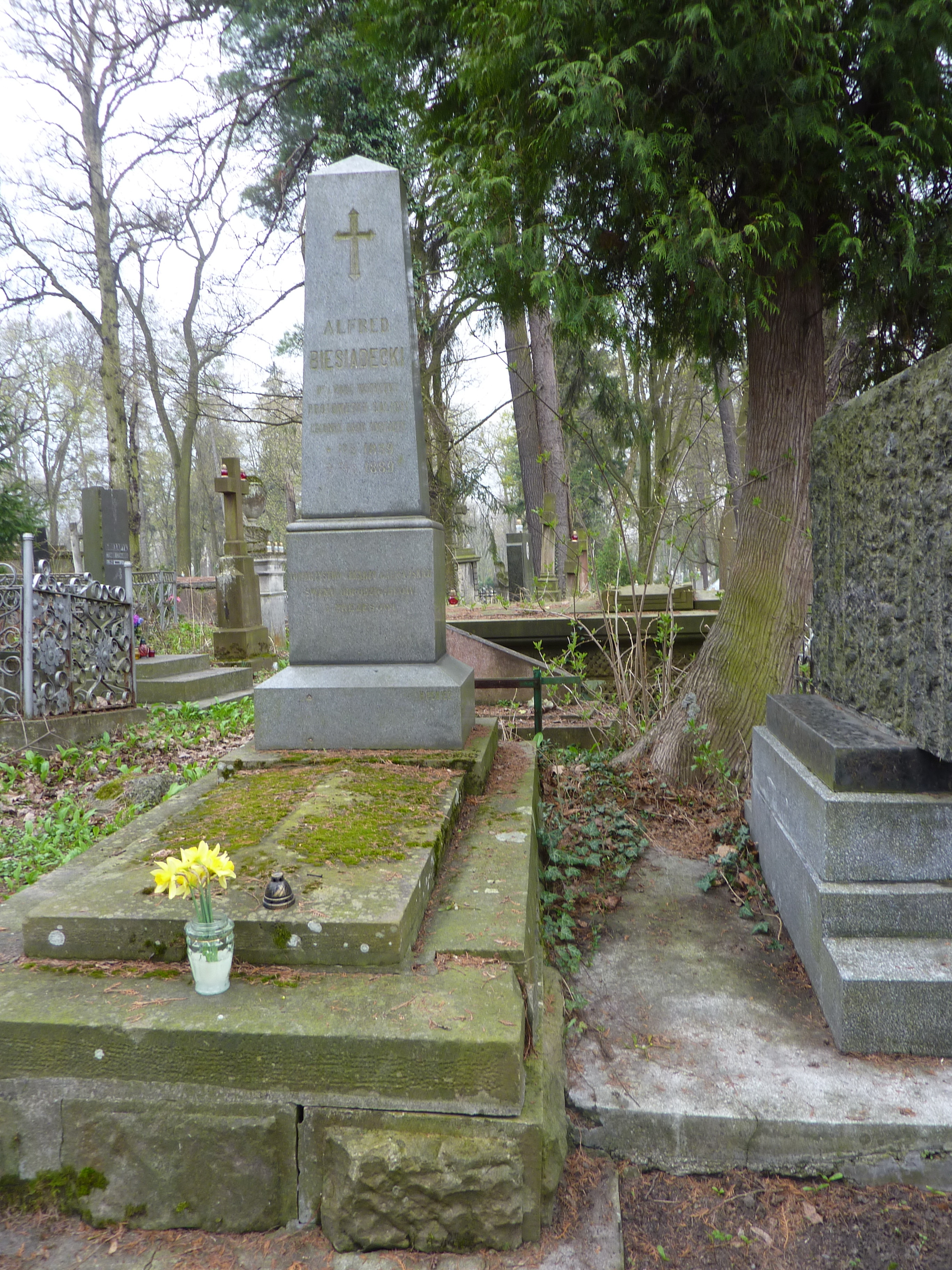
Grave of Alfred Biesiadecki at Lychakiv Cemetery

Alfred Biesiadecki (13 March 1839 – 31 March 1889) was a Polish pathologist born in Dukla.

He studied medicine at the University of Vienna, earning his medical doctorate in 1862. In 1865 he became an assistant at the institute of pathological anatomy in Vienna under Karl Rokitansky. From 1868 to 1876 he was a professor of pathological anatomy at the Jagiellonian University in Kraków, afterwards moving to Lviv where he served as Protomedikus, working as an organizer of health services.

Biesiadecki was a pioneer of Polish histopathology, remembered for contributions made in research of skin diseases. His name is associated with "Biesiadecki's fossa", a peritoneal recess that is also known as the iliacosubfascial fossa. He published medical treatises in Polish and German.

== Selected publications ==
- Über das Chiasma nervorum opticorum des Menschen und der Tiere (Involving the chiasma nervorum opticorum of humans and animals), 1860
- Untersuchungen über die Gallen- und Lymphgefässe der Menschenleber in pathologischen Zuständen (Studies on the bile and lymph vessels of the human liver in pathological states), 1867
- Beiträge zur physiologischen Anatomie der Haut (Contributions to the physiological anatomy of the skin), 1867
- Untersuchungen aus dem pathologisch-anatomischen Institut in Krakau (Investigations of the Pathological-anatomical Institute in Kraków), 1872
- Anatomija patologiczna gruczołów skórnych, 1874
