= Kozłowo =

Kozłowo may refer to the following places:

- Kozłowo, Grudziądz County in Kuyavian-Pomeranian Voivodeship (north-central Poland)
- Kozłowo, Świecie County in Kuyavian-Pomeranian Voivodeship (north-central Poland)
- Kozłowo, Podlaskie Voivodeship (north-east Poland)
- Kozłowo, Mława County in Masovian Voivodeship (east-central Poland)
- Kozłowo, Płock County in Masovian Voivodeship (east-central Poland)
- Kozłowo, Pułtusk County in Masovian Voivodeship (east-central Poland)
- Kozłowo, Gniezno County in Greater Poland Voivodeship (west-central Poland)
- Kozłowo, Nowy Tomyśl County in Greater Poland Voivodeship (west-central Poland)
- Kozłowo, Mrągowo County in Warmian-Masurian Voivodeship (north Poland)
- Kozłowo, Nidzica County in Warmian-Masurian Voivodeship (north Poland)
