= Szczepanki, Grudziądz County =

Szczepanki
- Village
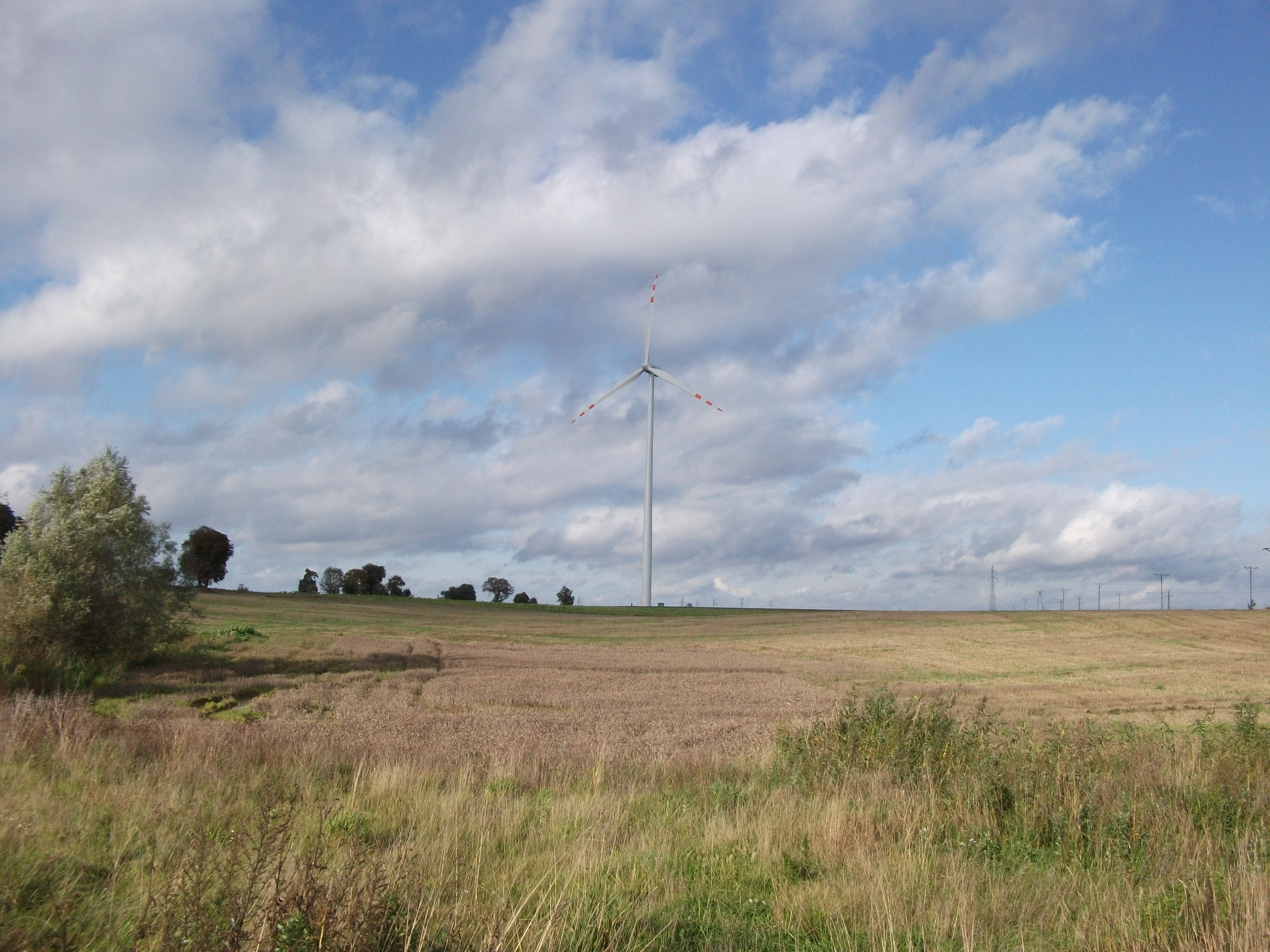

- Location within Poland
- Coordinates: 53°29′58″N 19°01′50″E
- Country: Poland
- Voivodeship: Kuyavian-Pomeranian
- County: Grudziądz
- Gmina: Łasin
- Time zone: UTC+1 (CET)
  - Summer (DST): UTC+2 (CEST)
- Vehicle registration: CGR

Szczepanki [ʂt͡ʂɛˈpaŋki] is a village in the administrative district of Gmina Łasin, within Grudziądz County, Kuyavian-Pomeranian Voivodeship, in north-central Poland.

== History ==
During the German occupation of Poland (World War II), Szczepanki was one of the sites of executions of Poles, carried out by the Germans in 1939 as part of the Intelligenzaktion. In 1939, the occupiers also carried out expulsions of Poles, who were then deported to the General Government in the more eastern part of German-occupied Poland, while their houses and farms were handed over to Germans as part of the Lebensraum policy.
