= Wydrzno =

- Village
- Location within Poland
- Coordinates: 53°34′N 19°4′E
- Country: Poland
- Voivodeship: Kuyavian-Pomeranian
- County: Grudziądz
- Gmina: Łasin

Wydrzno [ˈvɨdʐnɔ] is a village in the administrative district of Gmina Łasin, within Grudziądz County, Kuyavian-Pomeranian Voivodeship, in north-central Poland.
