= Widlice, Kuyavian-Pomeranian Voivodeship =

Widlice
- Village
- Location within Poland
- Coordinates: 53°29′19″N 19°6′51″E
- Country: Poland
- Voivodeship: Kuyavian-Pomeranian
- County: Grudziądz
- Gmina: Świecie nad Osą
- Population: 270

Widlice [vidˈlit͡sɛ] is a village in the administrative district of Gmina Świecie nad Osą, within Grudziądz County, Kuyavian-Pomeranian Voivodeship, in north-central Poland.
