= Lisnówko =

- Village
- Location within Poland
- Coordinates: 53°28′56″N 19°7′52″E
- Country: Poland
- Voivodeship: Kuyavian-Pomeranian
- County: Grudziądz
- Gmina: Świecie nad Osą
- Population: 130

Lisnówko [lisˈnufkɔ] is a village in the administrative district of Gmina Świecie nad Osą, within Grudziądz County, Kuyavian-Pomeranian Voivodeship, in north-central Poland.
