= Wybudowanie Łasińskie =

- Village
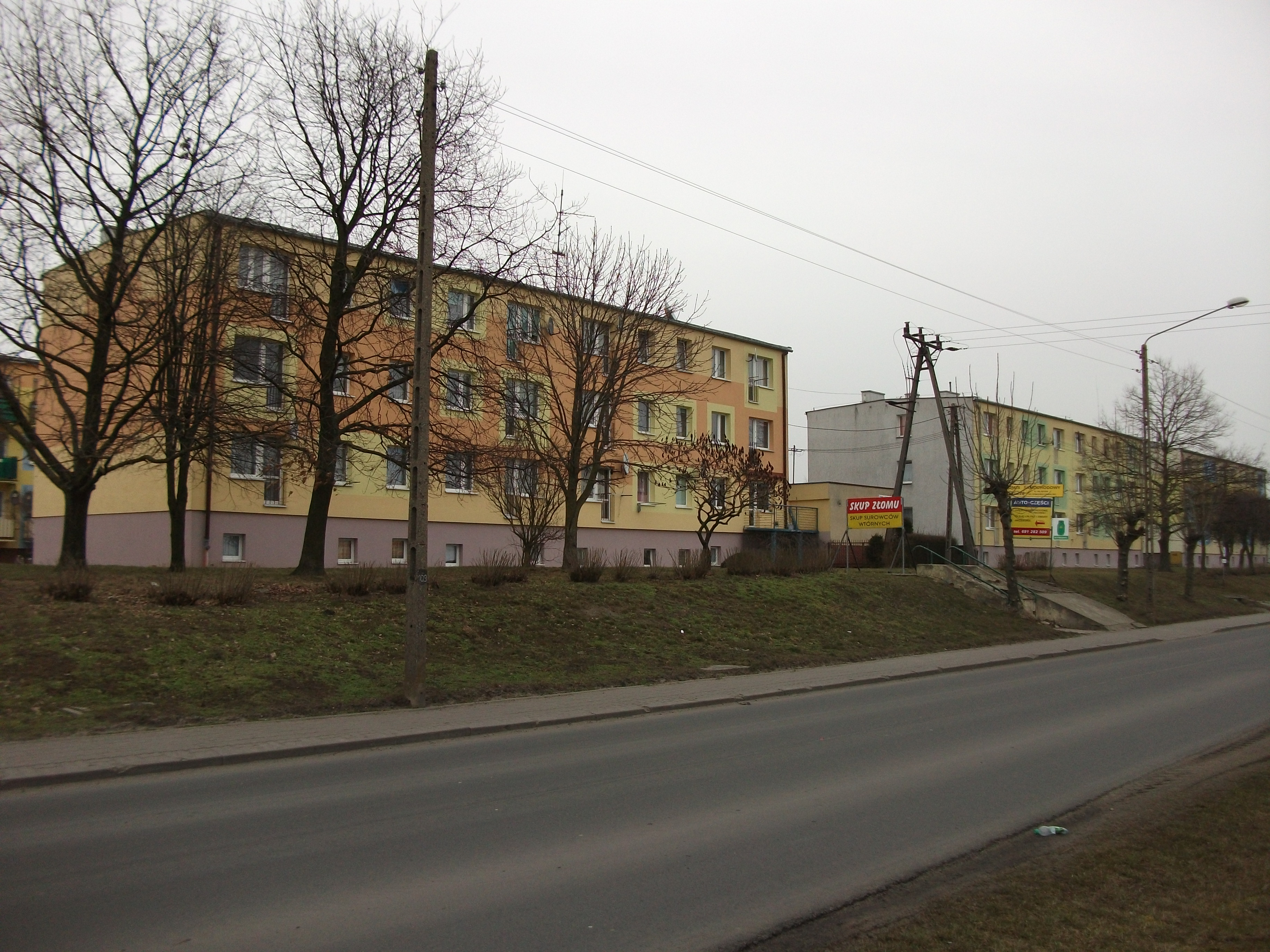

- Location within Poland
- Coordinates: 53°31′47″N 19°03′36″E
- Country: Poland
- Voivodeship: Kuyavian-Pomeranian
- County: Grudziądz
- Gmina: Łasin

Wybudowanie Łasińskie [vɨbudɔˈvaɲɛ waˈɕiɲskʲɛ] is a village in the administrative district of Gmina Łasin, within Grudziądz County, Kuyavian-Pomeranian Voivodeship, in north-central Poland.
