= Dębniaki, Grudziądz County =

Settlement in Poland

Dębniaki
- Colony
- Location within Poland
- Coordinates: 53°26′55″N 19°5′22″E
- Country: Poland
- Voivodeship: Kuyavian-Pomeranian
- County: Grudziądz
- Gmina: Świecie nad Osą

Dębniaki [dɛmbˈɲaki] is a colony in the administrative district of Gmina Świecie nad Osą, within Grudziądz County, Kuyavian-Pomeranian Voivodeship, in north-central Poland.
