= Ludwichowo, Grudziądz County =

Ludwichowo
- Village
- Location within Poland
- Coordinates: 53°31′22″N 19°8′48″E
- Country: Poland
- Voivodeship: Kuyavian-Pomeranian
- County: Grudziądz
- Gmina: Łasin

Ludwichowo [ludviˈxɔvɔ] is a village in the administrative district of Gmina Łasin, within Grudziądz County, Kuyavian-Pomeranian Voivodeship, in north-central Poland.
