= Lisewo-Zamek =

- Village
- Location within Poland
- Coordinates: 53°27′53″N 19°11′35″E
- Country: Poland
- Voivodeship: Kuyavian-Pomeranian
- County: Grudziądz
- Gmina: Świecie nad Osą

Lisnowo-Zamek [liˈsɛvɔ ˈzamɛk] is a village in the administrative district of Gmina Świecie nad Osą, within Grudziądz County, Kuyavian-Pomeranian Voivodeship, in north-central Poland.
