= Święte, Grudziądz County =

Święte
- Village
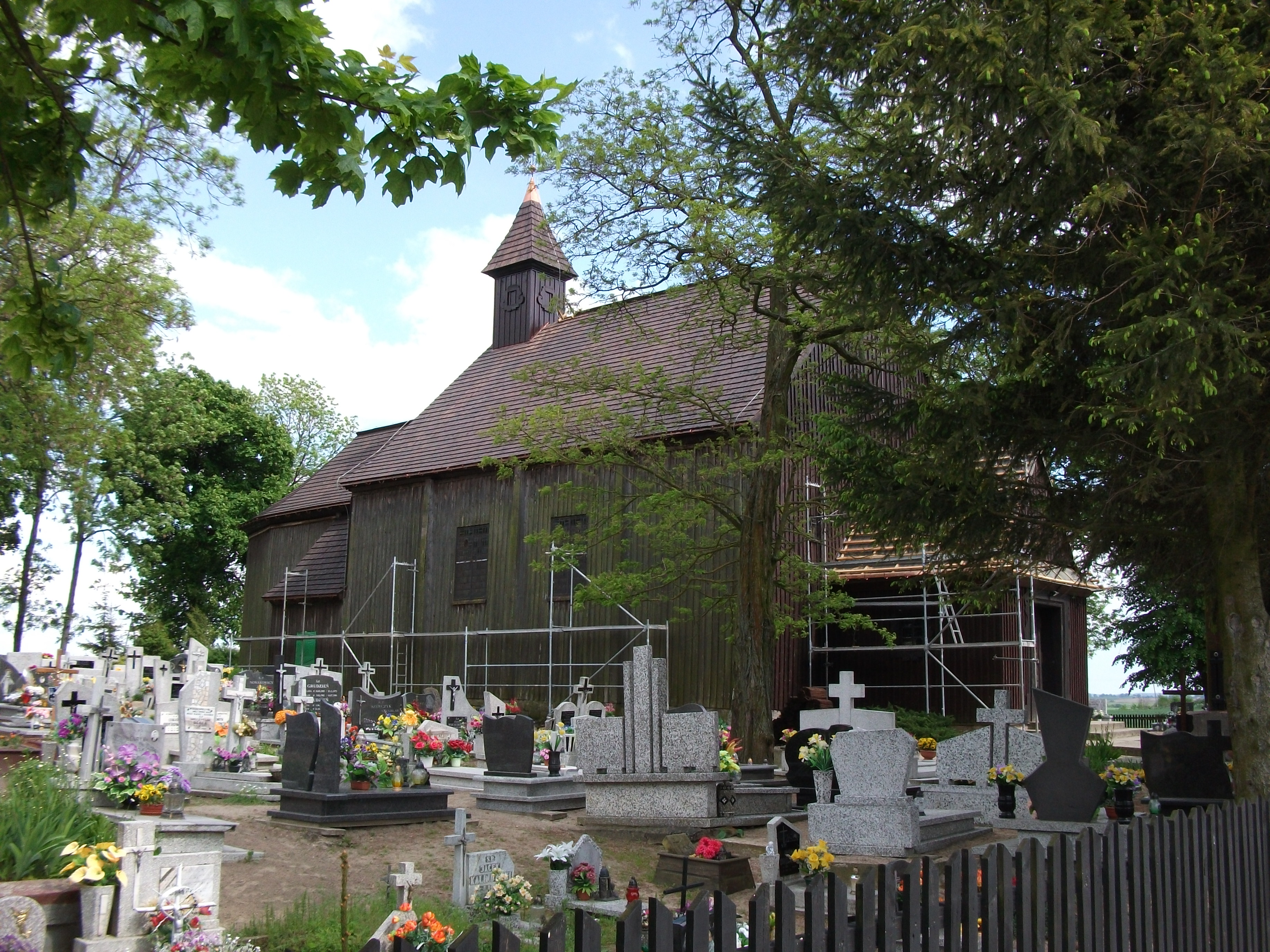

- Location within Poland
- Coordinates: 53°31′25″N 19°11′26″E
- Country: Poland
- Voivodeship: Kuyavian-Pomeranian
- County: Grudziądz
- Gmina: Łasin

Święte (Polish pronunciation: [ˈɕfjɛntɛ]) is a village in the administrative district of Gmina Łasin, within Grudziądz County, Kuyavian-Pomeranian Voivodeship, in north-central Poland.
