= Huta-Strzelce =

- Village
- Location within Poland
- Coordinates: 53°32′51″N 19°10′20″E
- Country: Poland
- Voivodeship: Kuyavian-Pomeranian
- County: Grudziądz
- Gmina: Łasin

Huta-Strzelce [ˈxuta ˈstʂɛlt͡sɛ] is a village in the administrative district of Gmina Łasin, within Grudziądz County, Kuyavian-Pomeranian Voivodeship, in north-central Poland.
