= Białobłoty, Kuyavian-Pomeranian Voivodeship =

Białobłoty
- Village
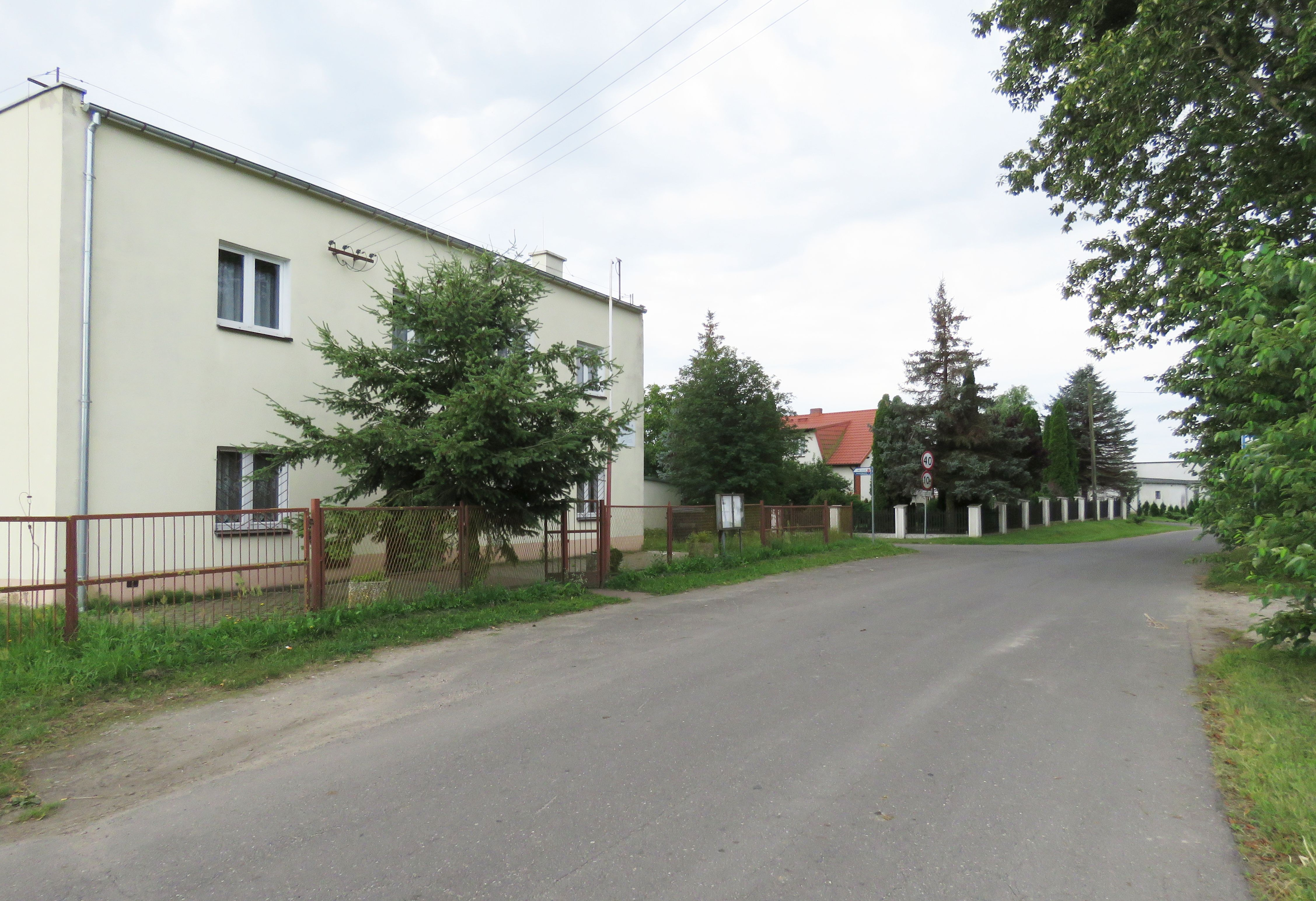

- Location within Poland
- Coordinates: 53°24′6″N 19°6′24″E
- Country: Poland
- Voivodeship: Kuyavian-Pomeranian
- County: Grudziądz
- Gmina: Świecie nad Osą
- Population: 170
- Time zone: UTC+1 (CET)
  - Summer (DST): UTC+2 (CEST)
- Vehicle registration: CGR

Białobłoty [bjawɔˈbwɔtɨ] is a village in the administrative district of Gmina Świecie nad Osą, within Grudziądz County, Kuyavian-Pomeranian Voivodeship, in north-central Poland. It is located in Chełmno Land within the historic region of Pomerania.

== History ==
During the German occupation of Poland (World War II), Białobłoty was one of the sites of executions of Poles, carried out by the Germans in 1939 as part of the Intelligenzaktion.
