= Jakubkowo, Grudziądz County =

Jakubkowo
- Village
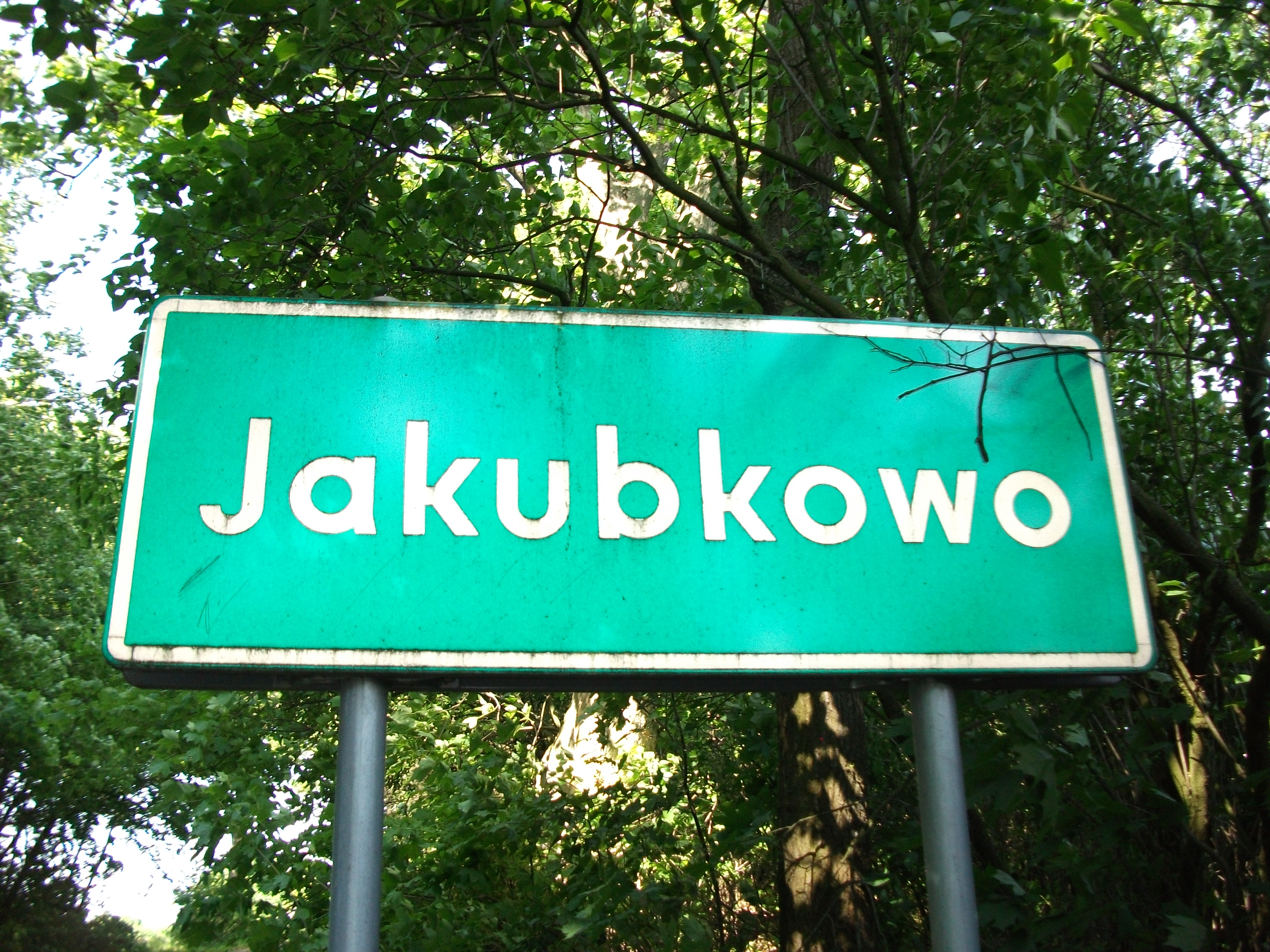
- Jakubkowo Road Sign

- Location within Poland
- Coordinates: 53°29′59″N 19°06′15″E
- Country: Poland
- Voivodeship: Kuyavian-Pomeranian
- County: Grudziądz
- Gmina: Łasin

Jakubkowo [jakupˈkɔvɔ] is a village in the administrative district of Gmina Łasin, within Grudziądz County, Kuyavian-Pomeranian Voivodeship, in north-central Poland.
