= Lisnowo =

- Village
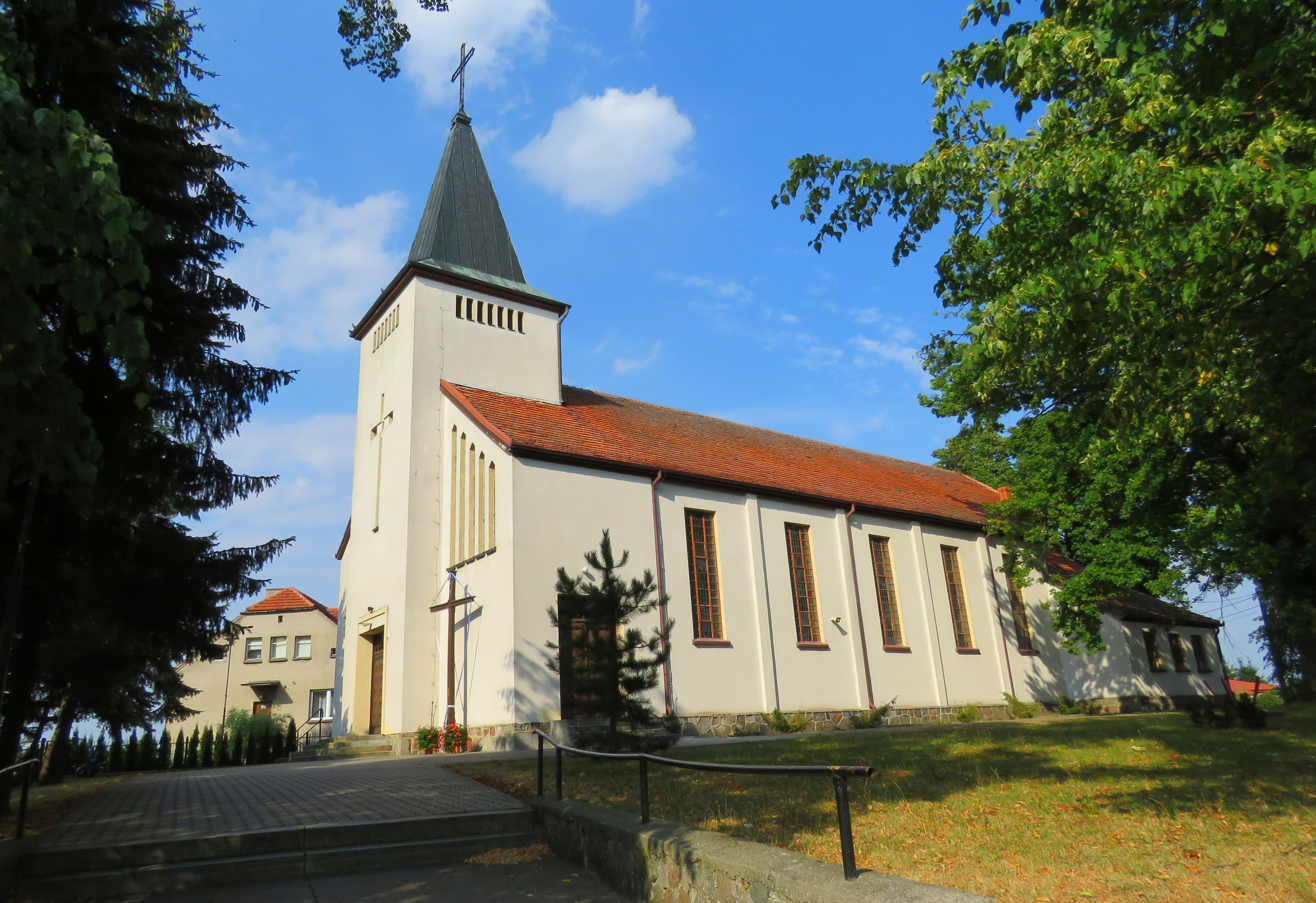
- Christ the King church in Lisnowo

- Location within Poland
- Coordinates: 53°27′57″N 19°9′48″E
- Country: Poland
- Voivodeship: Kuyavian-Pomeranian
- County: Grudziądz
- Gmina: Świecie nad Osą
- Population: 760
- Time zone: UTC+1 (CET)
  - Summer (DST): UTC+2 (CEST)
- Vehicle registration: CGR

Lisnowo [lisˈnɔvɔ] is a village in the administrative district of Gmina Świecie nad Osą, within Grudziądz County, Kuyavian-Pomeranian Voivodeship, in north-central Poland.

== History ==
During the German occupation of Poland (World War II), Lisnowo was one of the sites of executions of Poles, carried out by the Germans in 1939 as part of the Intelligenzaktion.
