= Przesławice, Kuyavian-Pomeranian Voivodeship =

Przesławice
- Village
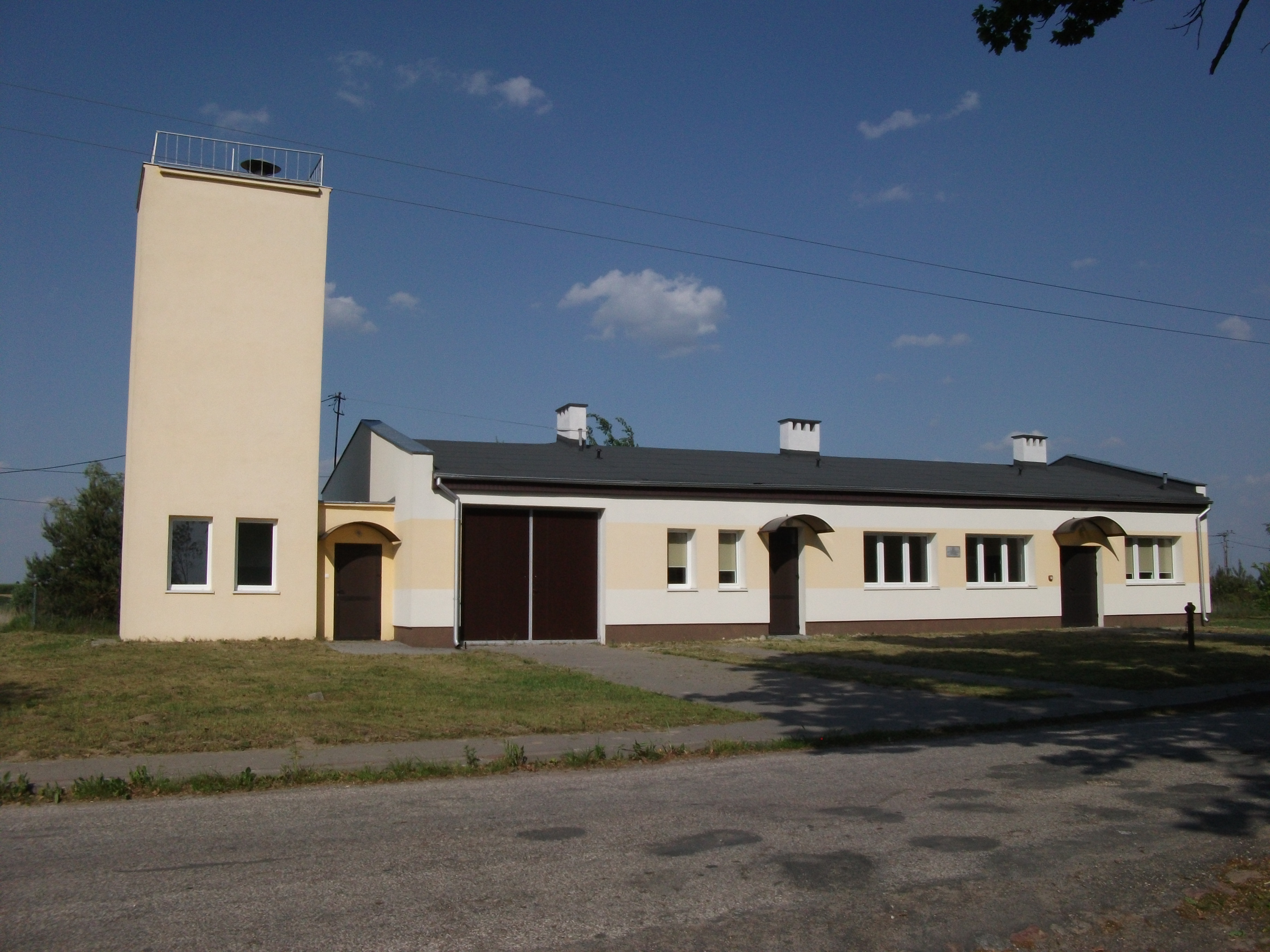
- Fire brigade in Przesławice

- Location within Poland
- Coordinates: 53°28′29″N 19°4′41″E
- Country: Poland
- Voivodeship: Kuyavian-Pomeranian
- County: Grudziądz
- Gmina: Łasin
- Time zone: UTC+1 (CET)
  - Summer (DST): UTC+2 (CEST)
- Vehicle registration: CGR

Przesławice [pʂɛswaˈvit͡sɛ] is a village in the administrative district of Gmina Łasin, within Grudziądz County, Kuyavian-Pomeranian Voivodeship, in north-central Poland.

During the German occupation of Poland (World War II), Przesławice was one of the sites of executions of Poles carried out by Germany in 1939 as part of the Intelligenzaktion. In 1939–1940, the Germans also carried out expulsions of dozens of Poles from the village. The Poles were deported either to the General Government (German-occupied central Poland) or to forced labour in Germany, while their farms of Poles were handed over to Germans as part of the Lebensraum policy. One child died during the expulsion.
