= Małe Szczepanki =

- Village
- Location within Poland
- Coordinates: 53°29′32″N 19°3′3″E
- Country: Poland
- Voivodeship: Kuyavian-Pomeranian
- County: Grudziądz
- Gmina: Łasin

Małe Szczepanki [ˈmawɛ ʂt͡ʂɛˈpaŋki] is a village in the administrative district of Gmina Łasin, within Grudziądz County, Kuyavian-Pomeranian Voivodeship, in north-central Poland.
