= Sokółka horse =

Polish breed of horse

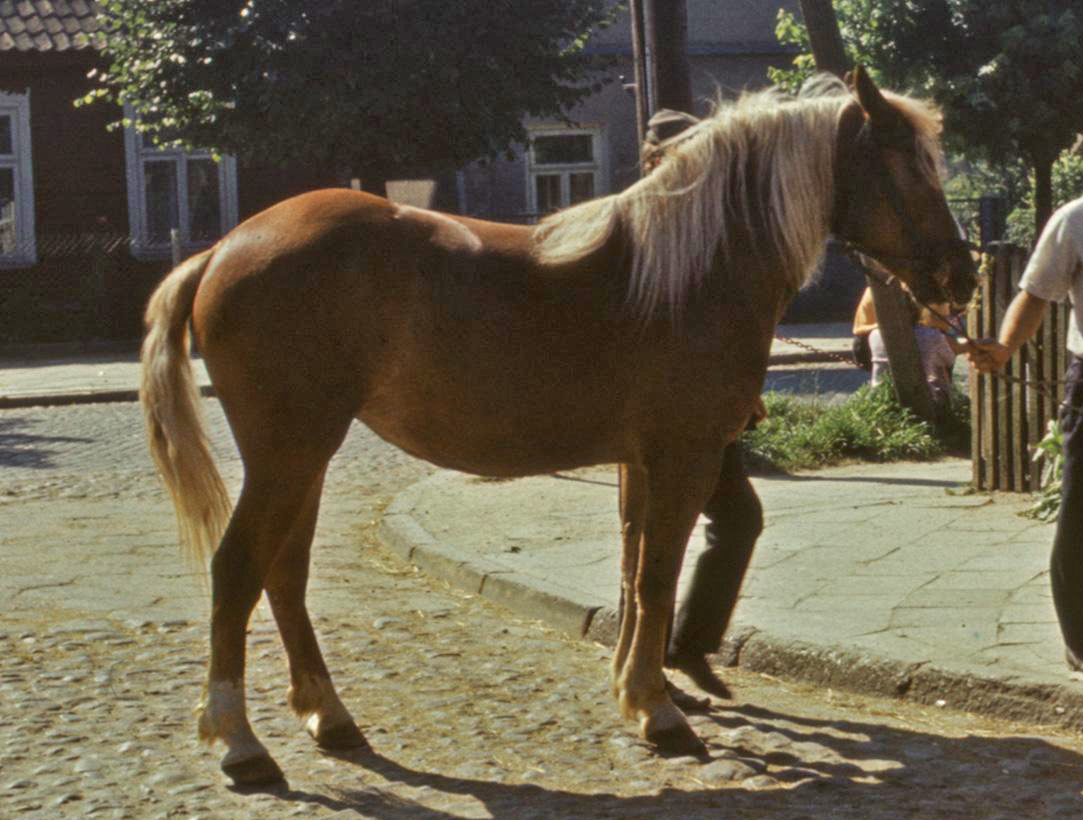
- Photograph from 1975

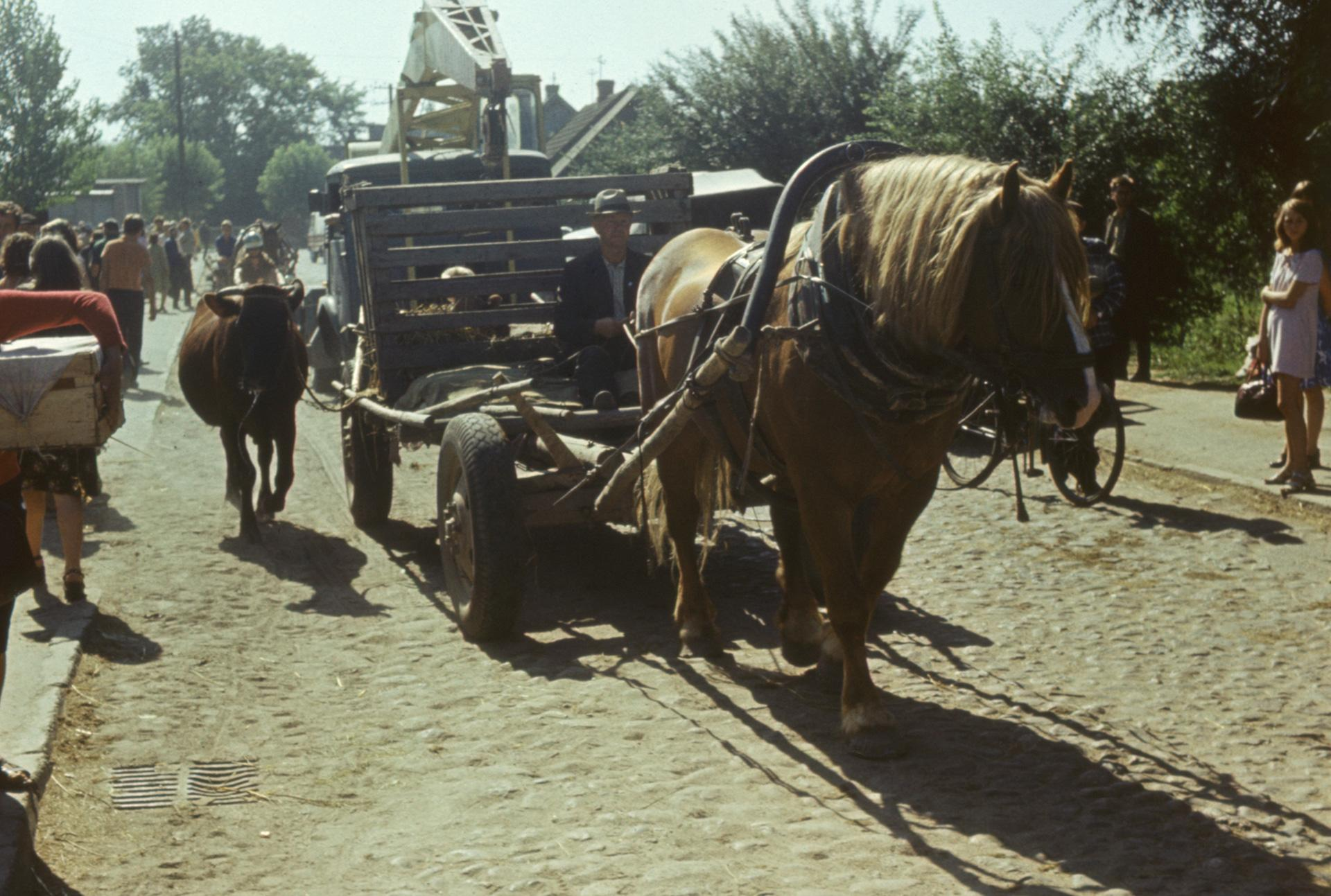
- In harness, photograph from 1975
- Conservation status: FAO (2007): not listed; DAD-IS (2025): at risk/endangered
- Other names: Polish: Sokólski; Polish: Koń sokólski; Sokólka
- Country of origin: Poland
- Distribution: Podlaskie Voivodeship; Lublin Voivodeship
- Use: meat; draught power; vegetation management

Traits
- Weight: Male: 800 kg; Female: 650 kg
- Height: 152–162 cm

The Sokółka horse (Polish: Koń sokólski), also known as Sokolski, is a Polish breed of draught horse. It is named for the town and county of Sokółka, near Białystok in north-eastern Poland, where it was first bred in the 1920s. It derives from cross-breeding of local Polish mares of Polish Coldblood type with imported Trait Belge and Ardennais stock. It is distributed mainly in the voivodeships of Lublin and Podlaskie.

== Characteristics ==
The Sokólski is clean-legged; the usual coat colour is chestnut. Average body weights are 650 kg for mares and 800 kg for stallions and geldings; heights at the withers average 156 cm and 160 cm respectively.

== Breed history ==
The Sokólski was bred in the 1920s in the north-eastern Republic of Poland, in the area of Grodno and Indura – now both in Belarus – Sokółka and Dąbrowa Białostocka. It is named for the town or county of Sokółka, near Białystok. It derives from cross-breeding of local Polish mares with imported stallions of Trait Belge and Ardennais stock. A stud-book was established in 1964 as part of the Polish Coldblood breed group.

It is distributed mainly in the voivodeships of Lublin and Podlaskie.

It shares parts of its history and ancestry with the Sztumski, of Sztum County in the voivodeship of Pomerania in north-western Poland. A genetic study in 2020 found sufficient genetic distance between the two to justify maintaining a separate stud-book for each.

The conservation status of the breed was not listed by the Food and Agriculture Organization of the United Nations in 2007. A total population of 4000–5000 animals was reported to DAD-IS for 2023, including 1498 registered broodmares and 399 active stallions; in 2025 the conservation status was listed as "at risk/endangered-maintained".

== Use ==
The Sokólski may be used for draught work in agriculture, forestry and refuse collection, particularly in organic farming or in difficult terrains. It may also be used for vegetation management on degraded, abandoned or fallow land; for driving in harness; and for hippotherapy. Heavy horses in Poland are commonly reared for horsemeat, particularly for the Italian market.
