= Linowo, Kuyavian-Pomeranian Voivodeship =

Linowo
- Village
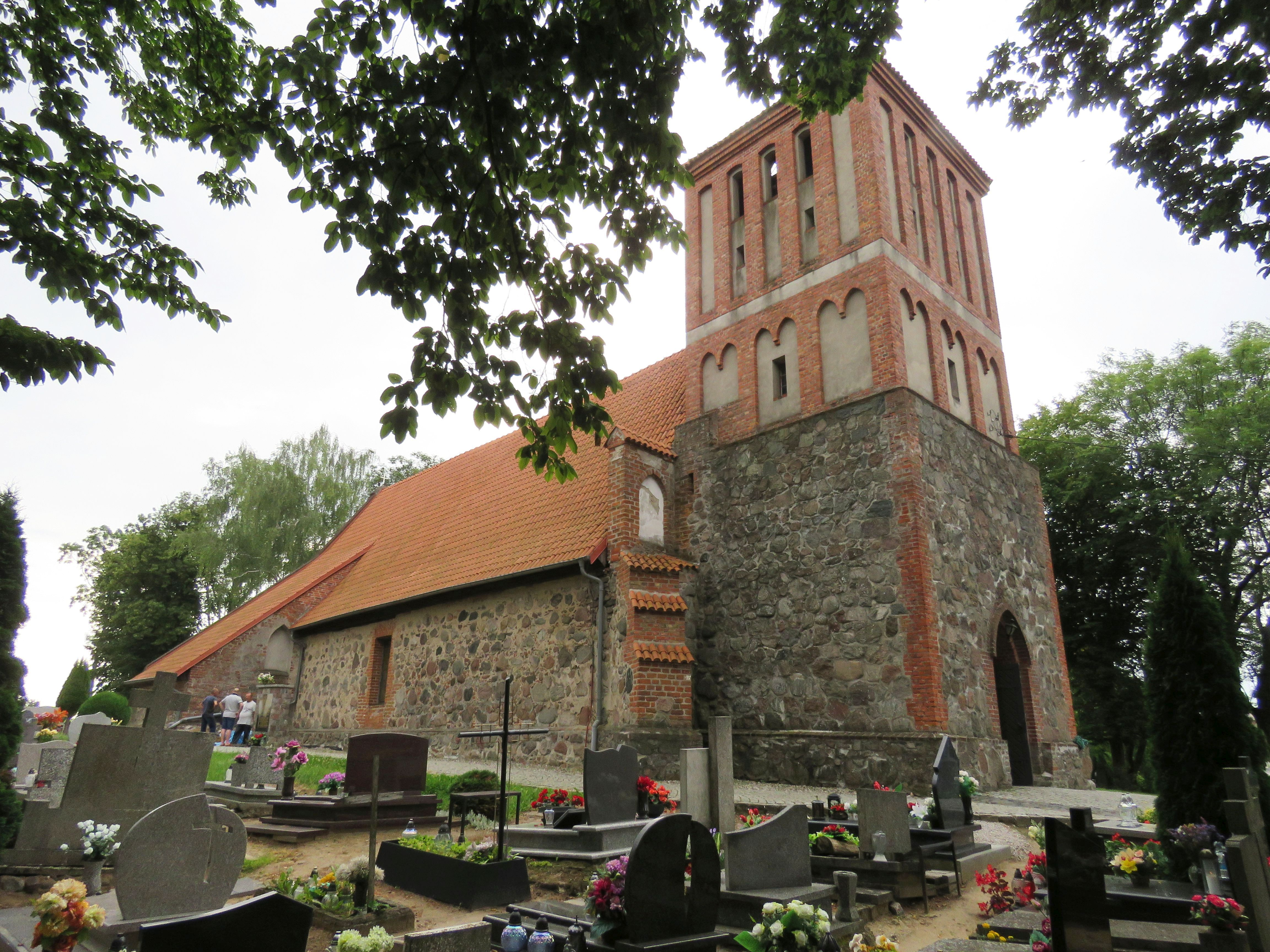
- Parish church of Saint Michael the Archangel from the 16th century

- Location within Poland
- Coordinates: 53°25′30″N 19°2′35″E
- Country: Poland
- Voivodeship: Kuyavian-Pomeranian
- County: Grudziądz
- Gmina: Świecie nad Osą
- Population: 600
- Time zone: UTC+1 (CET)
  - Summer (DST): UTC+2 (CEST)
- Vehicle registration: CGR

Linowo ([liˈnɔvɔ]; German: Linowo, 1939–42 Königlich Lindenau, 1942–45 Königslinde) is a village in the administrative district of Gmina Świecie nad Osą, within Grudziądz County, Kuyavian-Pomeranian Voivodeship, in north-central Poland. It is located in Chełmno Land within the historic region of Pomerania.

== History ==
During the German occupation of Poland (World War II), Linowo was one of the sites of executions of Poles, carried out by the Germans in 1939 as part of the Intelligenzaktion. Local sołtys (head of local administration) and several other local Poles, including a 17-year-old boy, were also murdered by the Germans in Mełno in October 1939.

== Transport ==
There is a train station in the village.
