= Szynwałdzik =

- Village
- Location within Poland
- Coordinates: 53°34′17″N 19°6′50″E
- Country: Poland
- Voivodeship: Kuyavian-Pomeranian
- County: Grudziądz
- Gmina: Łasin
- Population: 130

Szynwałdzik [ʂɨnˈvau̯d͡ʑik] is a village in the administrative district of Gmina Łasin, within Grudziądz County, Kuyavian-Pomeranian Voivodeship, in north-central Poland.
