= Mędrzyce =

- Village
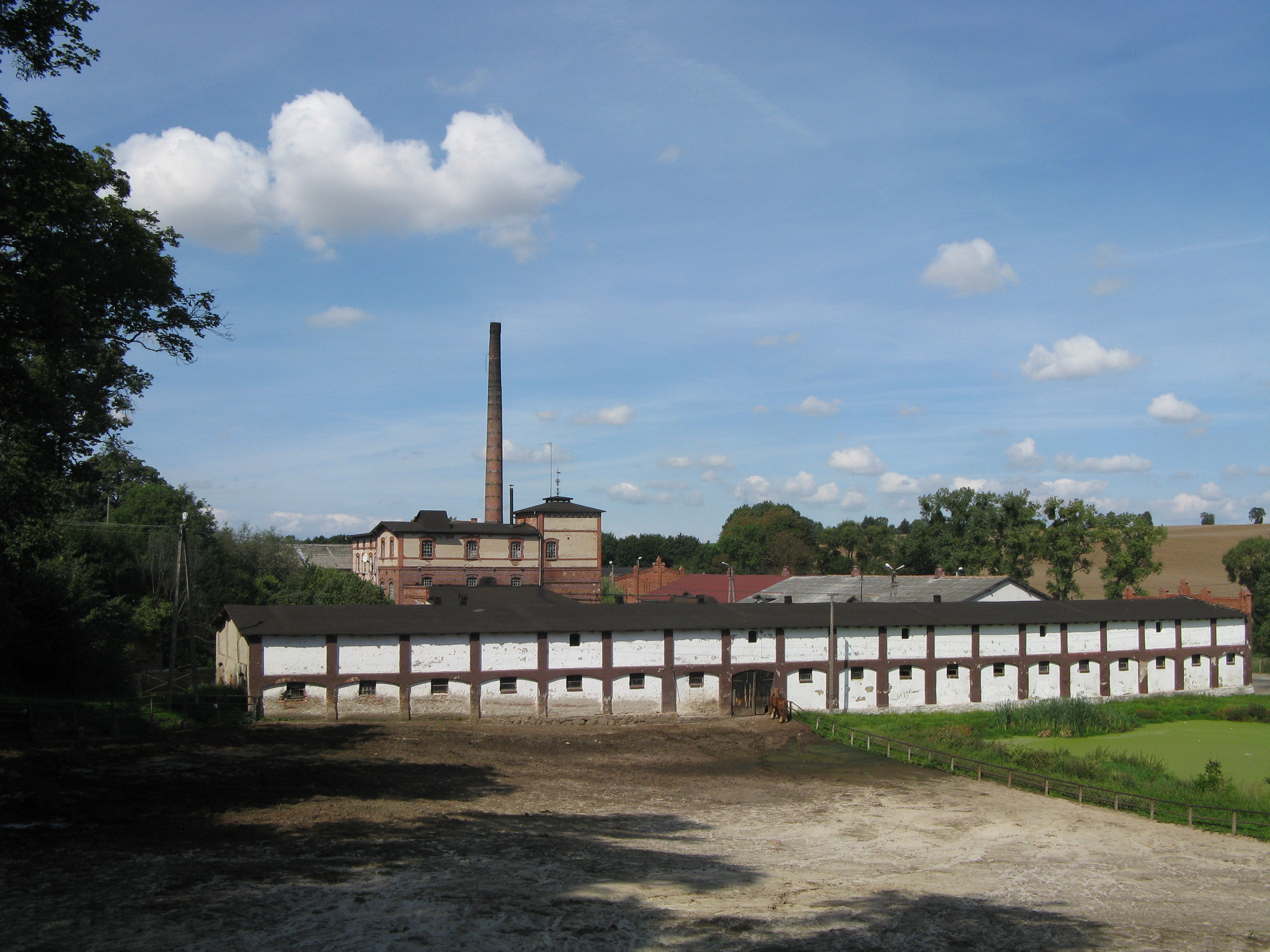
- Stables in Mędrzyce

- Location within Poland
- Coordinates: 53°28′14″N 19°06′21″E
- Country: Poland
- Voivodeship: Kuyavian-Pomeranian
- County: Grudziądz
- Gmina: Świecie nad Osą
- Population: 220

Mędrzyce [mɛnˈdʐɨt͡sɛ] is a village in the administrative district of Gmina Świecie nad Osą, within Grudziądz County, Kuyavian-Pomeranian Voivodeship, in north-central Poland.
