= Boże Pole =

Village in Gmina Łasin, Poland

- Village
- Country: Poland
- Voivodeship: Kuyavian-Pomeranian
- County: Grudziądz
- Gmina: Łasin

Boże Pole [ˈbɔʐɛ ˈpɔlɛ] is a village in the administrative district of Gmina Łasin, within Grudziądz County, Kuyavian-Pomeranian Voivodeship, in north-central Poland.
