= Szynwałd, Grudziądz County =

Szynwałd
- Village
- Location within Poland
- Coordinates: 53°35′N 19°6′E
- Country: Poland
- Voivodeship: Kuyavian-Pomeranian
- County: Grudziądz
- Gmina: Łasin
- Population: 410

Szynwałd [ˈʂɨnvau̯t] is a village in the administrative district of Gmina Łasin, within Grudziądz County, Kuyavian-Pomeranian Voivodeship, in north-central Poland.
