= Zawda =

- Village
- Location within Poland
- Coordinates: 53°35′N 19°10′E
- Country: Poland
- Voivodeship: Kuyavian-Pomeranian
- County: Grudziądz
- Gmina: Łasin

Zawda [ˈzavda] (German: Sawdin) is a village in the administrative district of Gmina Łasin, within Grudziądz County, Kuyavian-Pomeranian Voivodeship, in north-central Poland.

== Notable residents ==
- Botho von Frantzius (1898-1942), general
- Fritz von Frantzius (1865-1917), stockbroker
