= Zawdzka Wola =

- Village
- Location within Poland
- Coordinates: 53°34′N 19°11′E
- Country: Poland
- Voivodeship: Kuyavian-Pomeranian
- County: Grudziądz
- Gmina: Łasin

Zawdzka Wola [ˈzaft͡ska ˈvɔla] is a village in the administrative district of Gmina Łasin, within Grudziądz County, Kuyavian-Pomeranian Voivodeship, in north-central Poland.

Historical records for this area were kept in the nearby town of Schönwalde (Polish Szywald). These records date from 1757 to 1890. After the second partition of Poland, the area was part of West Prussia. After World War II the area became part of the re-established country of Poland. Historical records from the Family History Library indicate the town was also referred to as Zawda Wola or Zawska Wolla.
