= Bogdanki, Kuyavian-Pomeranian Voivodeship =

Bogdanki
- Village
- Location within Poland
- Coordinates: 53°29′29″N 19°5′21″E
- Country: Poland
- Voivodeship: Kuyavian-Pomeranian
- County: Grudziądz
- Gmina: Łasin
- Population: 130

Bogdanki [bɔɡˈdaŋki] is a village in the administrative district of Gmina Łasin, within Grudziądz County, Kuyavian-Pomeranian Voivodeship, in north-central Poland.
