= Karolewo, Grudziądz County =

Karolewo
- Village
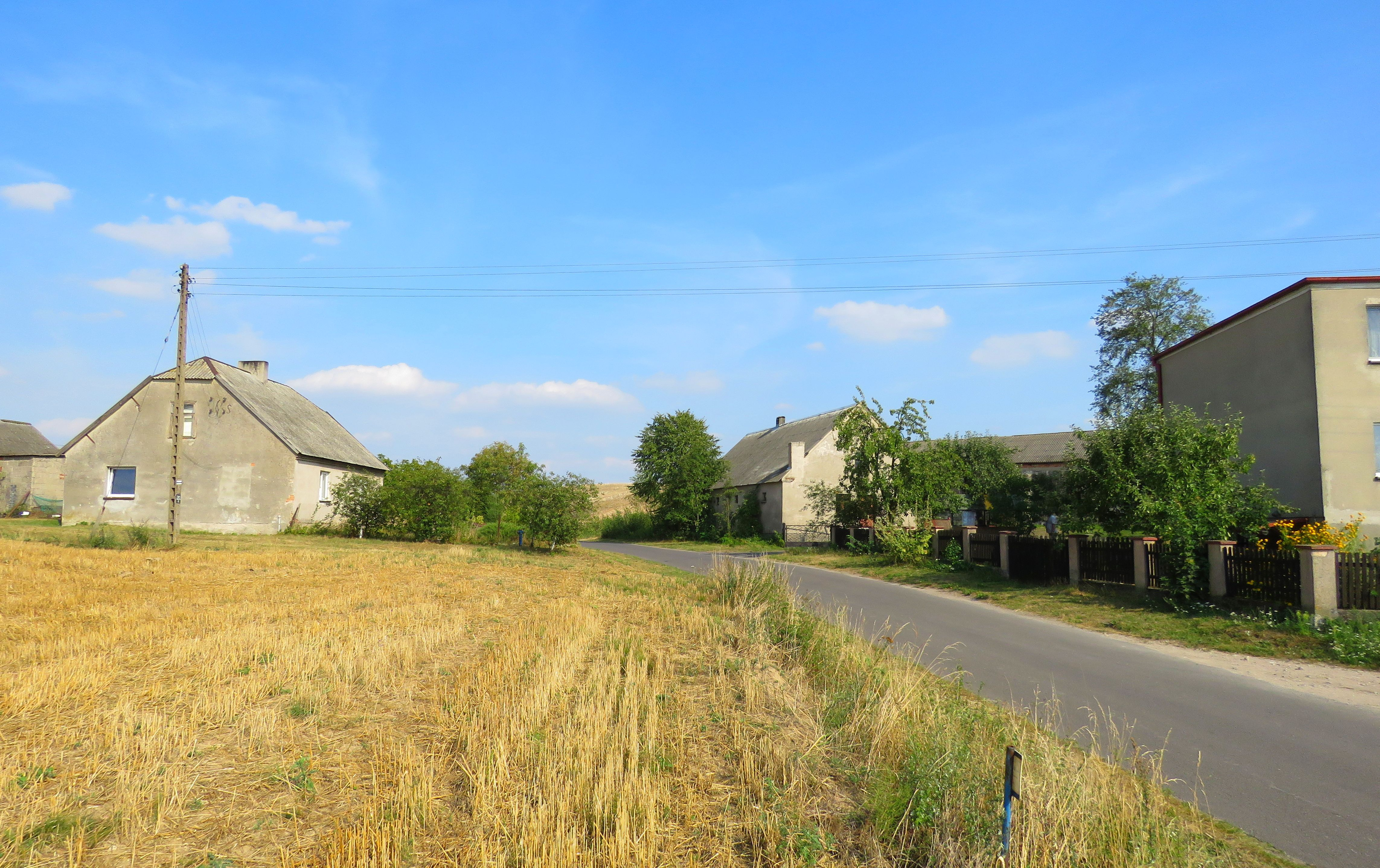

- Location within Poland
- Coordinates: 53°27′3″N 19°9′48″E
- Country: Poland
- Voivodeship: Kuyavian-Pomeranian
- County: Grudziądz
- Gmina: Świecie nad Osą
- Population: 150

Karolewo [karɔˈlɛvɔ] is a village in the administrative district of Gmina Świecie nad Osą, within Grudziądz County, Kuyavian-Pomeranian Voivodeship, in north-central Poland.
