= Stare Błonowo =

- Village
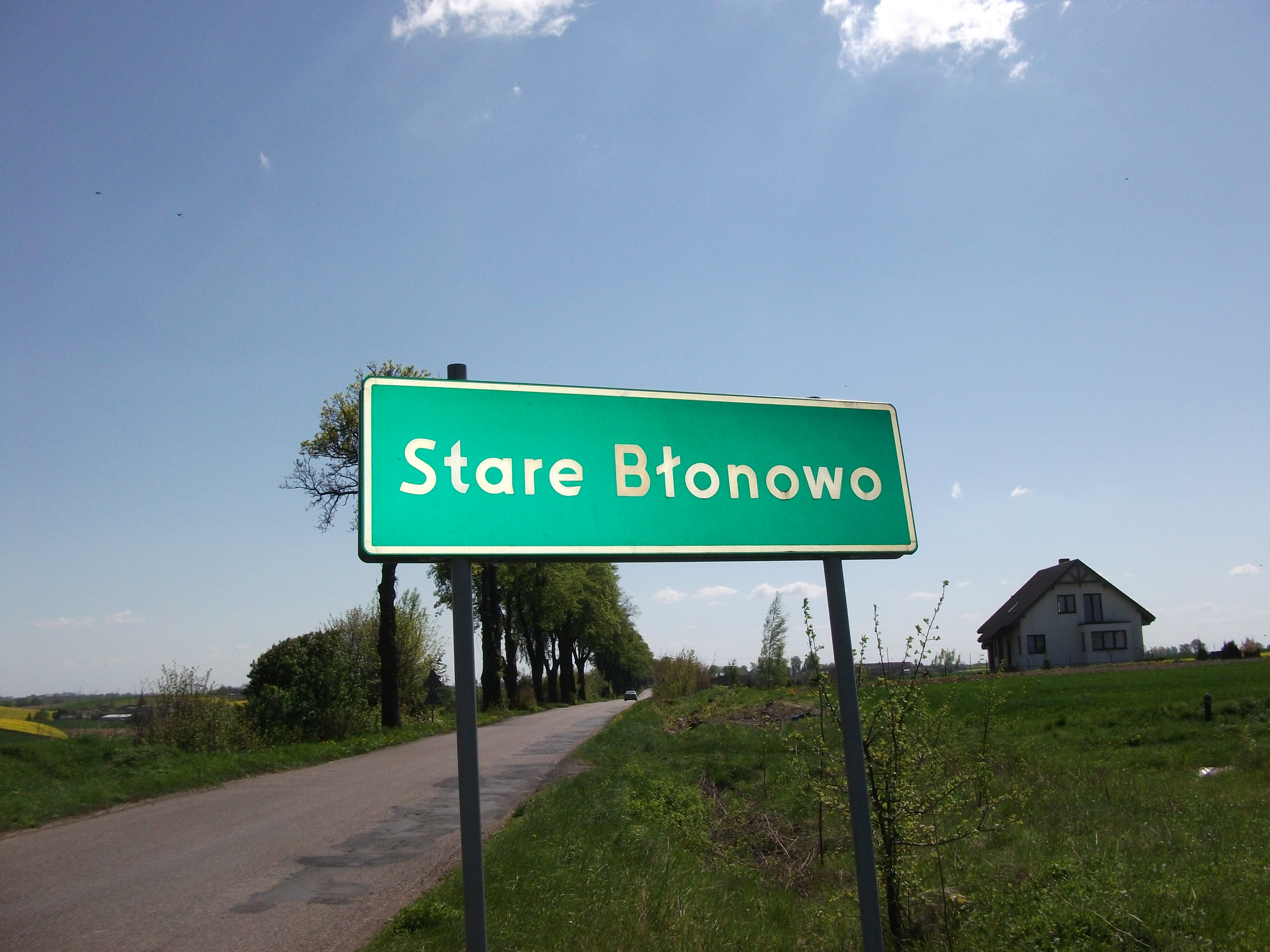
- Entrance to the village

- Location within Poland
- Coordinates: 53°33′N 19°5′E
- Country: Poland
- Voivodeship: Kuyavian-Pomeranian
- County: Grudziądz
- Gmina: Łasin
- Population: 300
- Time zone: UTC+1 (CET)
  - Summer (DST): UTC+2 (CEST)
- Vehicle registration: CGR

Stare Błonowo [ˈstarɛ bwɔˈnɔvɔ] is a village in the administrative district of Gmina Łasin, within Grudziądz County, Kuyavian-Pomeranian Voivodeship, in north-central Poland.

== History ==
During the German occupation of Poland (World War II), Stare Błonowo was one of the sites of executions of Poles, carried out by the Germans in 1939 as part of the Intelligenzaktion.
