= Gmina Świecie nad Osą =

Gmina Świecie nad Osą Świecie nad Osą Commune
- Gmina
- Coat of arms
- Interactive map of Gmina Świecie nad Osą
- Coordinates (Świecie nad Osą): 53°26′39″N 19°6′11″E
- Country: Poland
- Voivodeship: Kuyavian-Pomeranian
- County: Grudziądz County
- Seat: Świecie nad Osą

Area
  - Total: 94.67 km^{2} (36.55 sq mi)

Population (2006)
  - Total: 4,253
  - Density: 44.92/km^{2} (116.4/sq mi)
- Website: http://www.swiecienadosa.lo.pl

Gmina Świecie nad Osą is a rural gmina (administrative district) in Grudziądz County, Kuyavian-Pomeranian Voivodeship, in north-central Poland. Its seat is the village of Świecie nad Osą, which lies approximately 23 kilometres (14 mi) east of Grudziądz and 56 km (35 mi) north-east of Toruń.

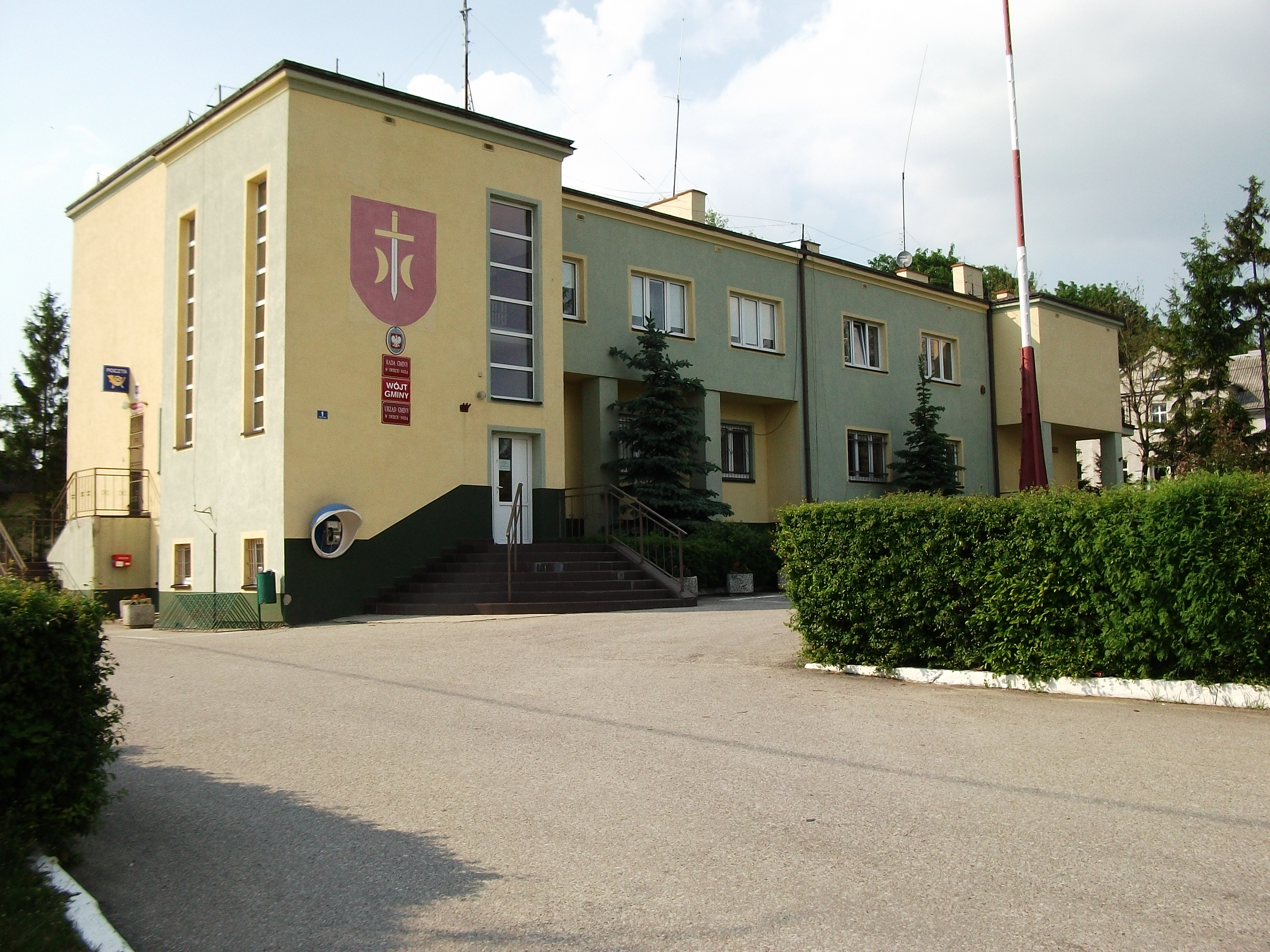

The gmina covers an area of 94.67 square kilometres (36.6 sq mi), and as of 2006 its total population is 4,253.

== Villages ==
Gmina Świecie nad Osą contains the villages and settlements of Białobłoty, Bursztynowo, Dębniaki, Karolewo, Kitnówko, Linowo, Lisewo-Zamek, Lisnówko, Lisnowo, Mędrzyce, Nowy Młyn, Partęczyny, Rychnowo, Świecie nad Osą, Szarnoś and Widlice.

== Neighbouring gminas ==
Gmina Świecie nad Osą is bordered by the gminas of Biskupiec, Gruta, Jabłonowo Pomorskie, Książki, Łasin and Radzyń Chełmiński.
