= The Book of Truth and Facts =

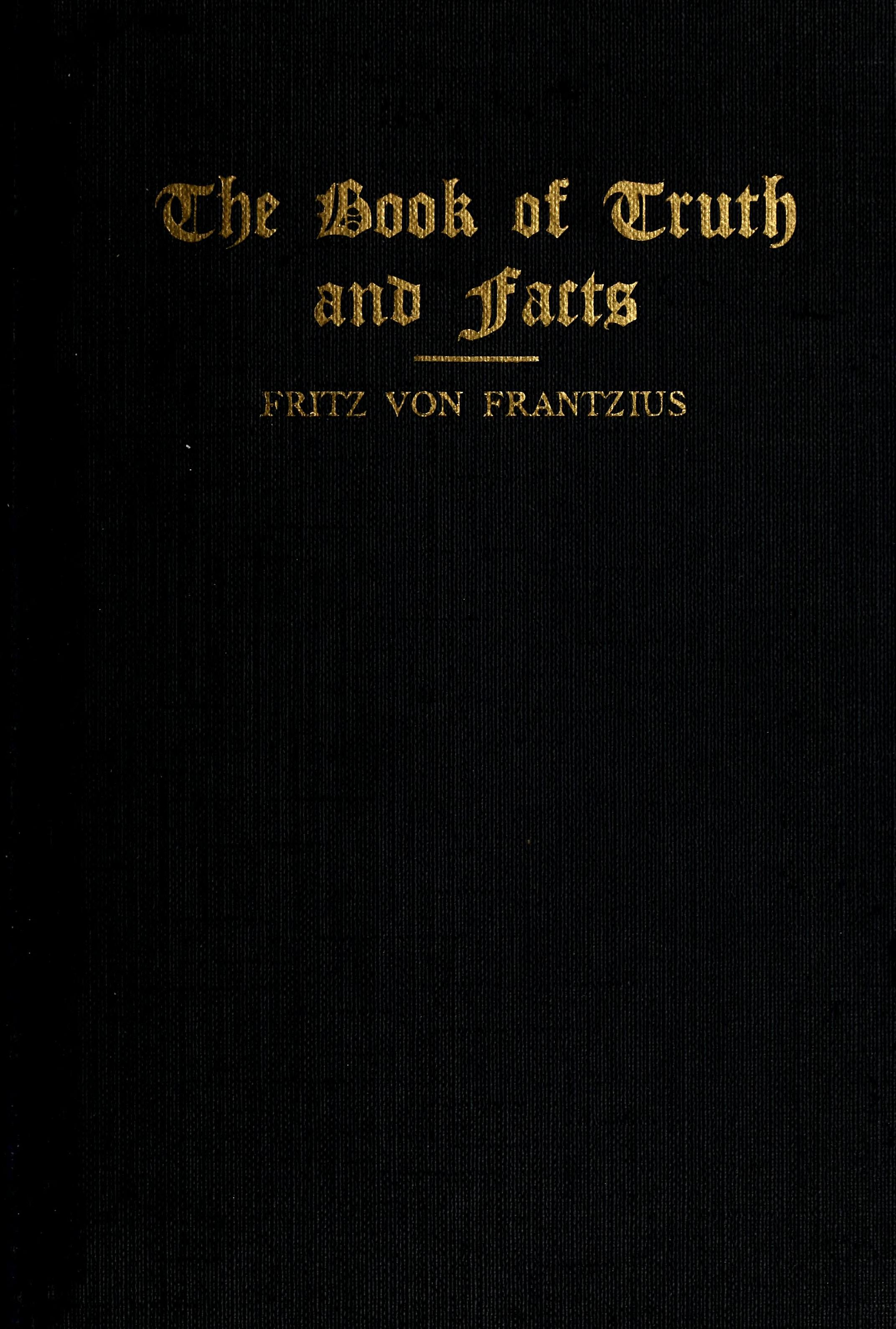
- Cover of the 1916 edition of the book.
- Author: Fritz von Frantzius
- Publication date: 1914

The Book of Truth and Facts (originally published as Germans as Exponents of Culture) was originally released in 1914 by Friedrich Wilhelm von Frantzius It was published during World War I and functioned as a piece of pro-German propaganda. The booklet was written in response to an article entitled "Germans as Exponents of Culture" penned by Brander Matthews, which appeared in the September 20, 1914 edition of the New York Times.

Von Frantzius’s goal in writing the book was to "enlighten the American people on conditions, not only in Germany, but also in the United States and England, and to acquaint them with German ideals, which are so grossly misunderstood in this country [America]". The main argument is that Germans possess culture, or "Kultur", that all other countries lack. He argues that "there is a great difference between 'civilization' and 'Kultur.' Many nations are highly civilized, but to have 'Kultur' means to possess deep conscience and high morale, and a philosophical conception of life."

Von Frantzius broke down the booklet into three themes: German Achievements, English Culture, and American Culture. He further elaborated on the German Achievements by specifying nine areas: Philosophy, Science, Art, Inventions, Discoveries, Finance, Commerce, Administration, and Legislation. Three deeply resonating themes occur throughout the piece: German superiority, British inferiority, and American dependence.

Von Frantzius argued that the German people, through the achievements of their culture, have gained a superior status to that of the English. He claims that Germans within the last eighty years have the greatest inventions, educational structures, artistically creative minds, and developments in scientific research and discoveries. He asserts that these achievements "signify the greatest process in culture ever made by any nation within any such brief space of time". He uses these arguments to enforce the idea of German superiority and English inferiority. Because of the lack of sustaining culture within American society, von Frantzius maintains that Americans were led into a state of dependence on the British.

Von Frantzius stresses the American dependence on British culture during World War I. One of the most prevailing dependencies discussed is American reliance on English media. He describes the lack of German media within the American social structure, declaring "we really have no American press in the United States to-day, but an English one which is decidedly anti-German". He explains that all other areas of American life are influenced greatly by the British and that Americans could benefit from a stronger influence of German "Kultur".
