= Gmina Łasin =

Gmina Łasin Łasin Commune
- Gmina
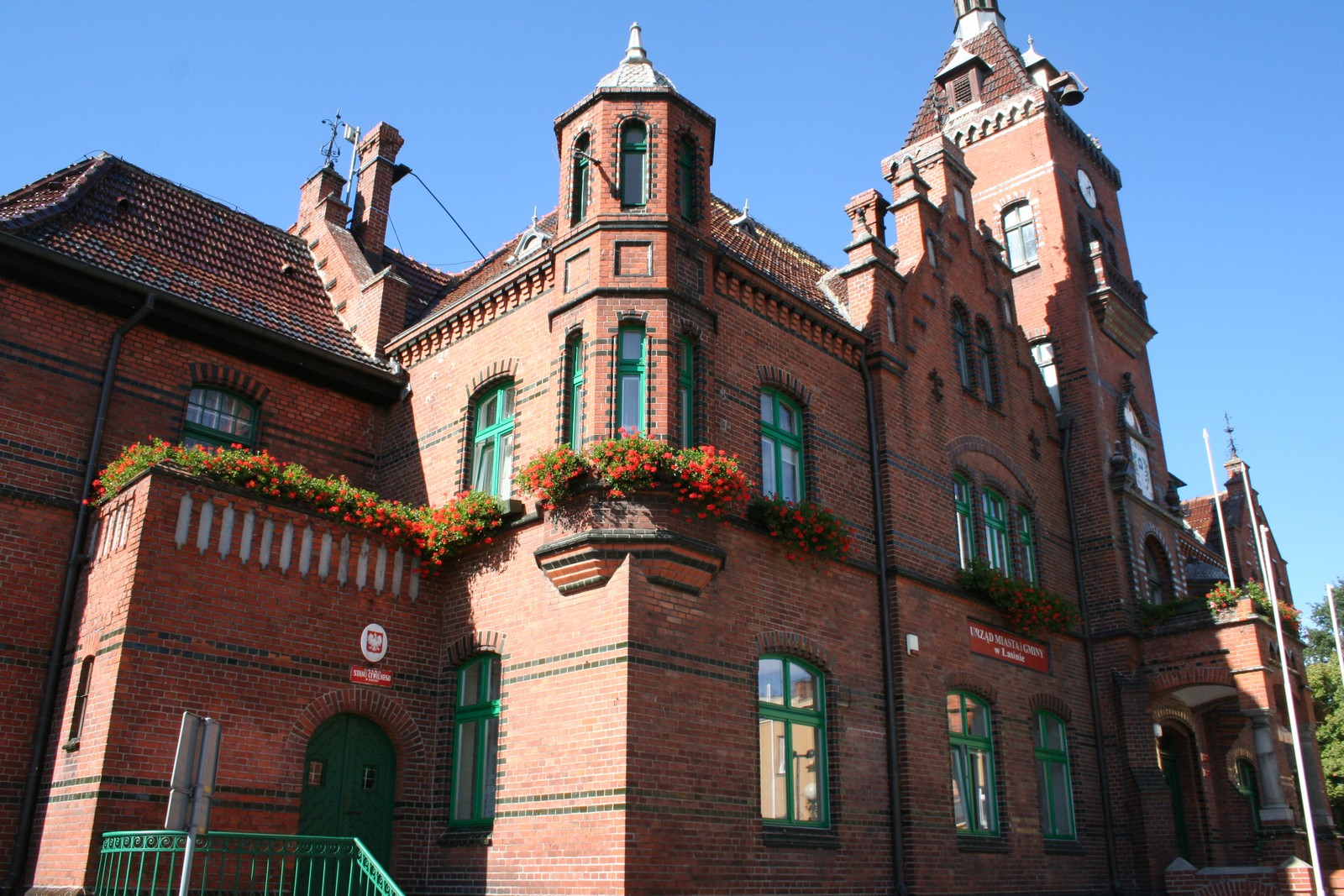
- Town Hall in Szubin, seat of the gmina office

- Coat of arms
- Interactive map of Gmina Łasin
- Coordinates (Łasin): 53°30′59″N 19°5′24″E
- Country: Poland
- Voivodeship: Kuyavian-Pomeranian
- County: Grudziądz County
- Seat: Łasin

Area
  - Total: 136.58 km^{2} (52.73 sq mi)

Population (2006)
  - Total: 8,288
  - Density: 60.68/km^{2} (157.2/sq mi)
  - Urban: 3,276
  - Rural: 5,012
- Time zone: UTC+1 (CET)
  - Summer (DST): UTC+2 (CEST)
- Vehicle registration: CGR
- Website: http://www.lasin.pl/

Gmina Łasin is an urban-rural gmina (administrative district) in Grudziądz County, Kuyavian-Pomeranian Voivodeship, in north-central Poland. Its seat is the town of Łasin, which lies approximately 21 kilometres (13 mi) east of Grudziądz and 63 km (39 mi) north-east of Toruń.

The gmina covers an area of 136.58 square kilometres (52.7 sq mi), and as of 2006 its total population is 8,288 (out of which the population of Łasin amounts to 3,276, and the population of the rural part of the gmina is 5,012).

== Villages ==
Apart from the town of Łasin, Gmina Łasin contains the villages and settlements of Bogdanki, Boże Pole, Goczałki, Gordanowo, Hermanowo, Huta-Strzelce, Jakubkowo, Jankowice, Kozłowo, Ludwichowo, Małe Szczepanki, Nogat, Nowe Błonowo, Nowe Jankowice, Nowe Mosty, Plesewo, Przesławice, Stare Błonowo, Święte, Szczepanki, Szonowo Królewskie, Szonowo Szlacheckie, Szynwałd, Szynwałdzik, Wybudowanie Łasińskie, Wydrzno, Zawda and Zawdzka Wola.

== Neighbouring gminas ==
Gmina Łasin is bordered by the gminas of Biskupiec, Gardeja, Gruta, Kisielice, Rogóźno and Świecie nad Osą.
