= Peter von Frantzius =

Peter von Frantzius (sometimes Frantizius) (* 1896; died April 6, 1968) was a Chicago businessman and arms dealer to the Chicago underworld during Prohibition, later dubbed by the press as "The Armorer of Gangland".

He was the son of German immigrants. His father Fritz von Frantzius was a stock market dealer and died 1917.

Frantzius started with mail order sales of guns from his parents home and opened a shop later on. 1924 he had a very successful business selling all manner of sports goods including guns.

An almost exclusive supplier of the Chicago Outfit (although often selling to rival gangs such as the North Side Mob), he was one of the first to supply "Tommy" submachine guns and other specialized weaponry connected to countless gangland slayings during the bootleg wars of the 1920s, including the murder of Brooklyn mobster Frankie Yale in 1928, the St. Valentine's Day Massacre in 1929 and the 1930 gangland murder of Chicago journalist Jake Lingle.

On one occasion, when asked by authorities to explain the sale of six machine guns to known organized crime figures, Frantzius answered before a coroner's jury that he had assumed the weapons were for the use of the Mexican government to use against revolutionaries.

Despite his connections to organized crime, Frantzius was never prosecuted against and continued to operate his sporting goods business Sports, Inc. until his death on April 6, 1968. Sports, Inc. produced and sold many firearms related items, including his namesake FRANZITE pistol grips, until going out of business in 1969.
