= Polish Coldblood =

Polish breed of horse

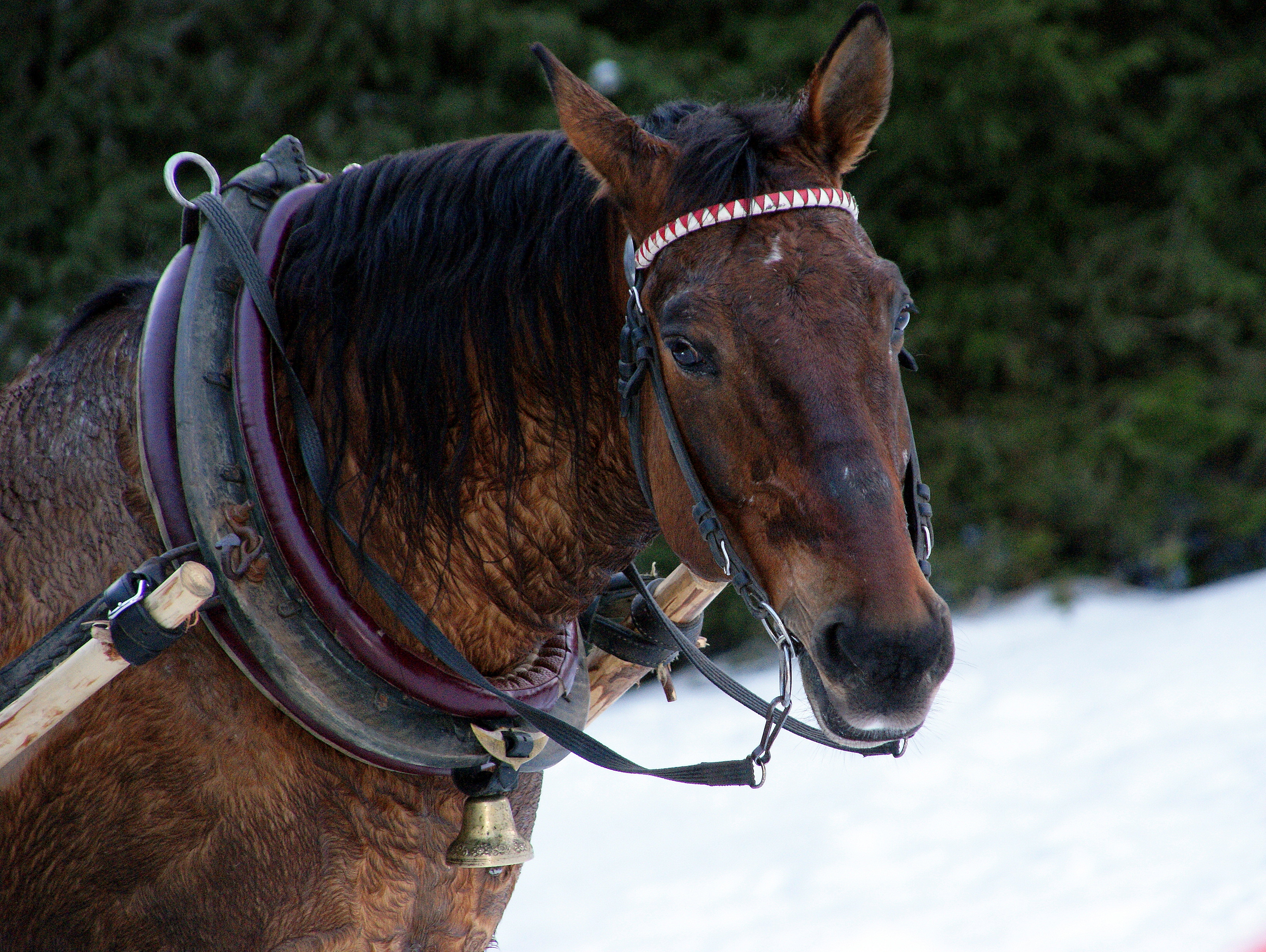
- Conservation status: FAO (2007): not at risk; DAD-IS (2024): not at risk
- Other names: Polish Draught; Polski Koń Zimnokrwisty; Zimnokrwiste
- Country of origin: Poland
- Use: tractive power; horsemeat

Traits
- Weight: 600–800 kg
- Height: 148–160 cm

The Polish Coldblood is a modern Polish breed or group of breeds of draught horse of medium to heavy weight. It was formed in 1964 when the various regional draught breeds or types were merged into a single stud-book. Those local types derived from cross-breeding of local mares with imported stallions of heavy draught breeds, principally of Ardennais, Belgian Draught and Swedish Ardennes stock.

In the twenty-first century the horses are used for tractive power and are reared for horsemeat, particularly for the Italian market.

== History ==
In 1964 the various regional draught breeds of Poland were merged into a single stud-book, the Księga Stadna Koni Zimnokrwistych I Pogrubionych. Among these were the Garwolin, the Kopczyk Podlaski, the Koszalin, the Lidzbark, the Łowicz-Sochaczewski, the Sokółka and the Sztumski.

In 2024 the total number of the horses was some 121000–126000 head, substantially lower than in 2002, when it was almost 330000. The registered breeding stock consisted of approximately 8000 brood-mares and 2000 stallions. In 2024 the conservation status of the breed was "not at risk".

A separate stud-book was established in 2013 for the Arden or Polish Ardennes, bred at the stud-farms of Bielin in the West Pomeranian Voivodeship and Nowe Jankowice in the Kuyavian-Pomeranian Voivodeship. It derives from Ardennais and Swedish Ardennes stock imported since the later nineteenth century and is bred principally as a harness horse.

== Characteristics ==
The Polish Coldblood is a heavy horse, with weights usually in the range 600–800 kg, though some can weigh more than 900 kg. The height at the withers usually falls between 148 and 160 cm.

== Use ==
The regional draught breeds of Poland were used principally for tractive power in agriculture. In the twenty-first century the horses are commonly reared for horsemeat, particularly for the Italian market.
