= Saharet =

Australian dancer (1878-1964)

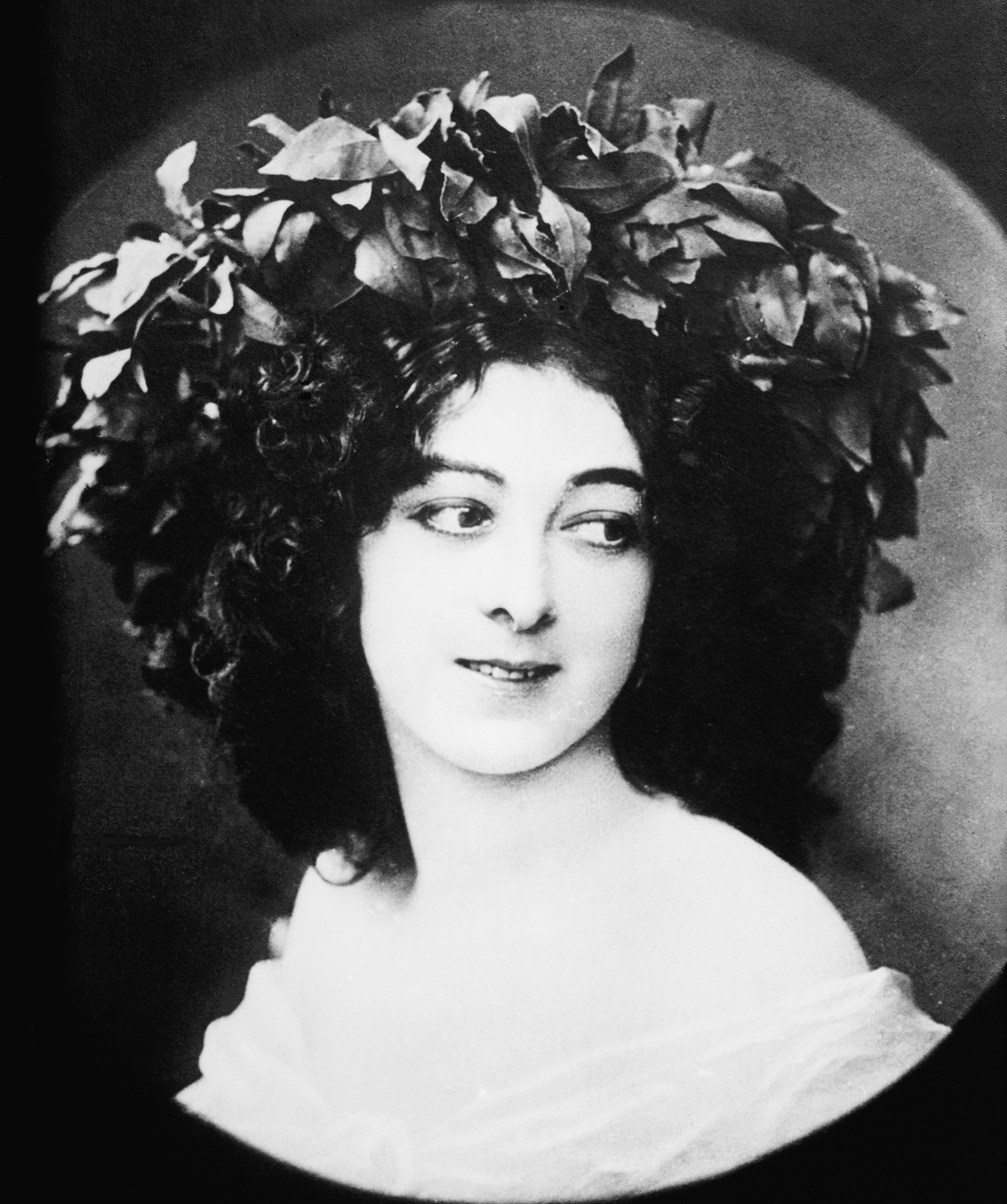
- Born: Paulina Clarissa Molony; 23 March 1878; Richmond, Victoria, Australia
- Died: 24 July 1964 (aged 86); Battle Creek, Michigan, U.S.
- Years active: 1891–1919
- Spouses: Ike Rose (m. 1896; div. 1913) Fritz von Frantzius (m. 1913; div. 1913) Max Lowe (m. 1917; div. 1930)
- Children: 1

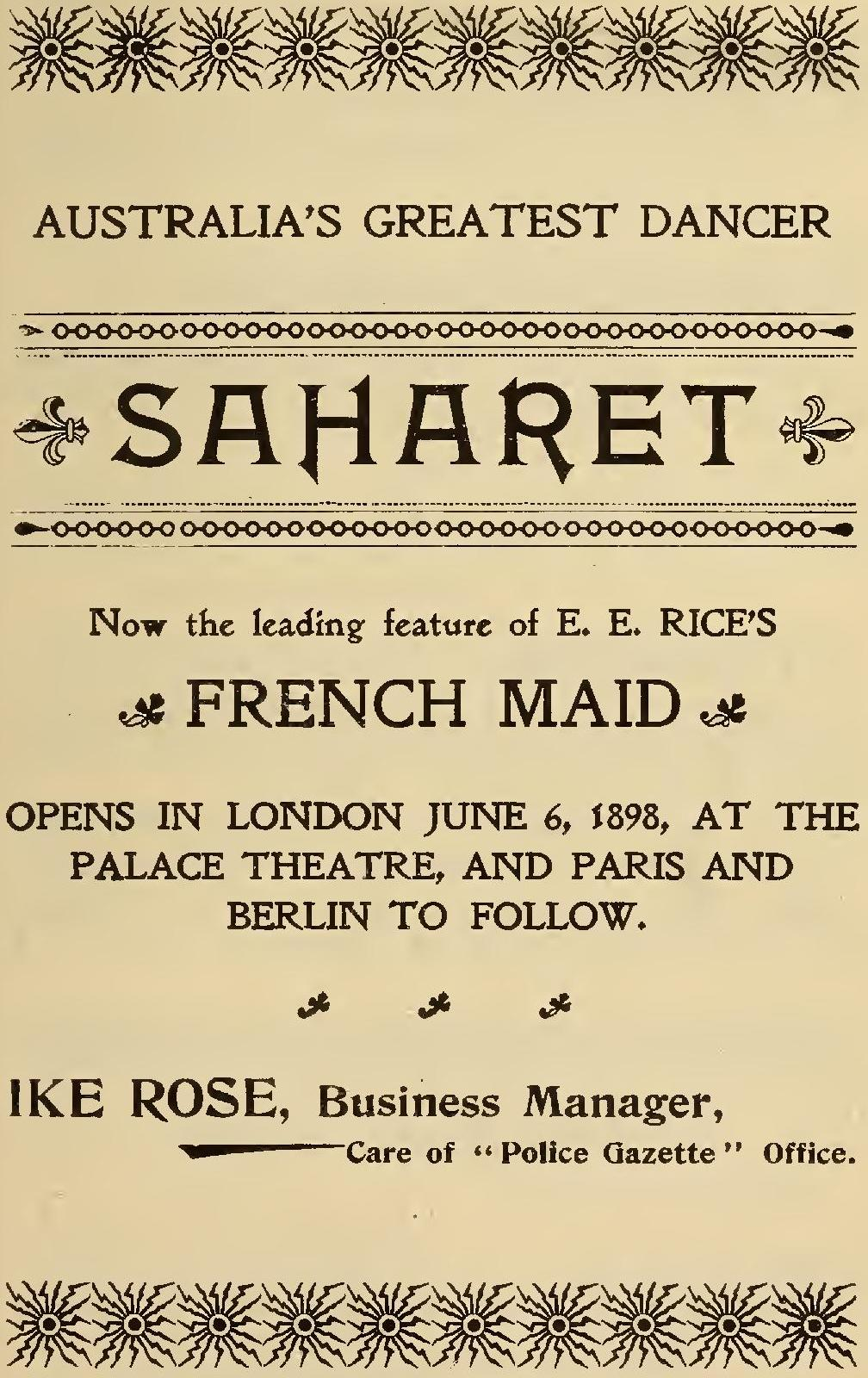
1898 ad, from the Police Gazette Sporting Annual published in the United States.

Paulina Clarissa Molony (23 March 1878 – 24 July 1964), known professionally as Saharet, was an Australian dancer who performed in vaudeville music houses as well as in Broadway productions in the United States as well as in Europe, earning considerable fame and notoriety.

== Early life ==
Saharet was born Paulina Clarissa Molony on 23 March 1878 in Richmond, a suburb of Melbourne, Australia to Irish-born tailor Benjamin Robert Molony and Elizabeth Foon (born 1858), a woman of part Chinese ancestry from Ballarat. Paulina had a half sister, Amelia Caroline Fook, from her mother's first marriage to James Ah Moy Fook, and two biological sisters, Martha Lily (born 1879) and Julia Millicent (born 1881). By her own account she was born in Melbourne on 24 March 1879. During her career her birth name was given as Clarice Campbell. It was also claimed she had been born in Ballarat, the birthplace of her mother, and had appeared on stage in Australia as a juvenile. It is unknown where she learned to dance, or how she found her way to the United States, but in May 1891, at the age of 13, she had joined the "Liliputians", a company performing at San Francisco's Baldwin Theater as "Clarice Campbell".

== Entertainer ==
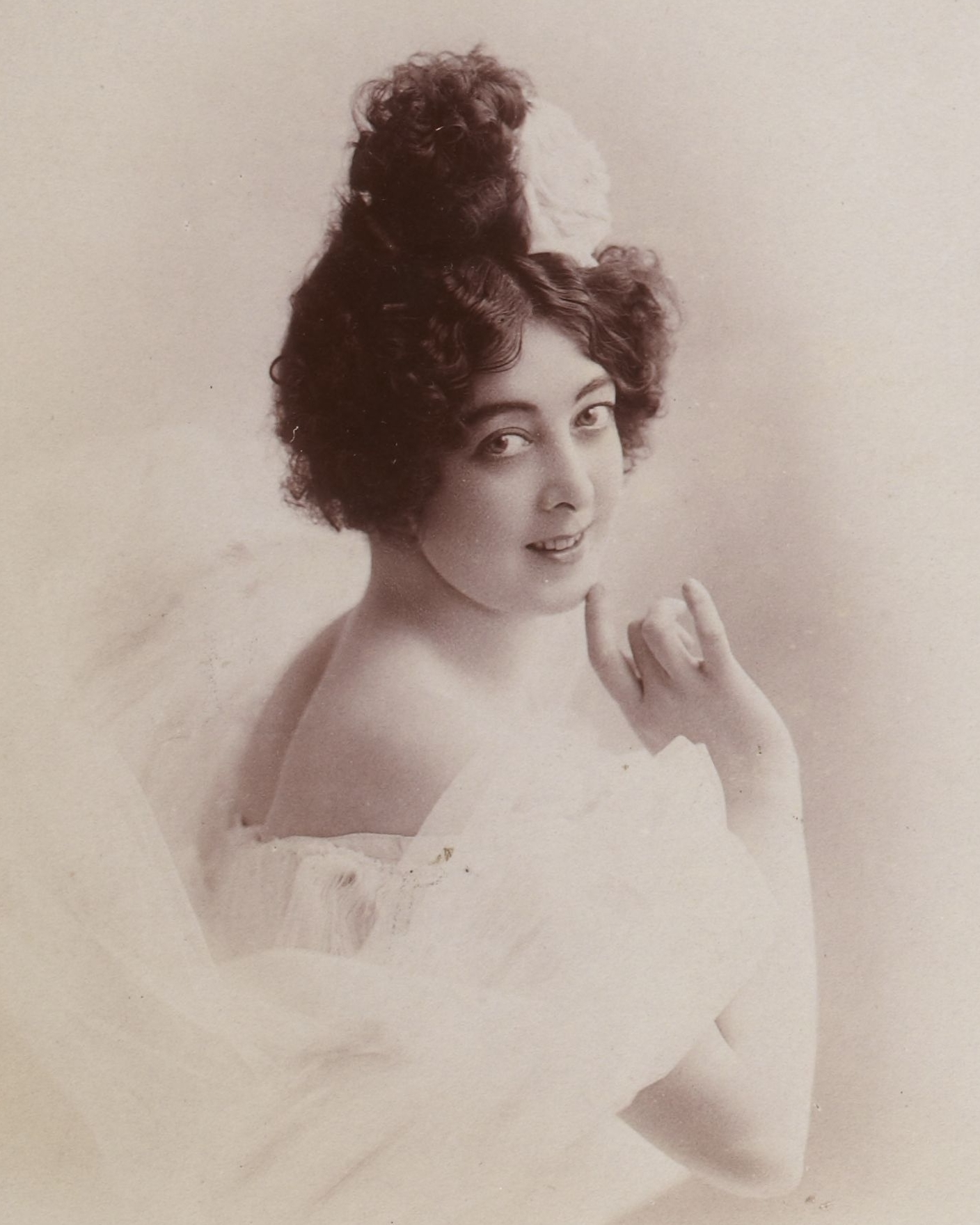
Saharet

In 1894 she had taken the stage name Saharet and toured the United States with Michael B. Leavitt's "Spider and Fly" vaudeville company, while in 1895 she was associated with the "Night Owls" vaudeville company. At the age of 18, in May 1896, she married Isaac Rosenstamm, a German-born entrepreneur from New York, later known as Ike Rose. Their daughter Caroline Madelon (Carrie) was born in November 1896 in New York. Rose managed her career, even for five years after the couple had drifted apart around 1906. Following the birth of her daughter, she appeared at Koster & Bial's Music Hall, 34th Street (Manhattan), Herald Square, New York City, along with a troupe of whirlwind dancers, and Adele Purvis-Onri. According to Leann Richards, the highlight of her short turn was doing the splits. Her onstage audacity combined with a risqué element, charmed audiences and earned her considerable fame. In a show billed Gayest Manhattan, Saharet admirably danced a French quadrille.

In 1897, she appeared at the Palace Theatre, London, when her Australian roots were reported in Australian newspapers for the first time. Returning to New York, theatrical producer, E.E. Rice, obtained her services for The French Maid with one reviewer describing Saharet as an "India rubber lady" in her rendition of a "dislocation dance". In September 1897 she danced at the Olympia Roof Garden. The French Maid was presented in October by the Herald Square Theatre, a Theatre which also hosted a thirtieth annual benefit to aid the charity fund of New York Lodge #1 of the Benevolent and Protective Order of Elks in November. Saharet volunteered her time, as did Anna Held and Ross and Fenton, among others. She helped raise money for the mother and widow of William Hoey at the Herald Square in December.

Saharet's 1898 tour of Europe established her as a star, for while Rose demanded a high salary or arranged a percentage deal, a string of publicity stunts also attracted crowds to see her. "A competent dancer...by the time Ike Rose was finished marketing her charms, she was one of Europe's classical beauties."

Saharet toured with Held as a special feature during the 1902 season. In April 1903 she danced at the Circle Theatre, Broadway, before departing on another tour of Europe.

She was the star of a show at the American Music Hall, West, Manhattan, in March 1909, and was summoned to return by several curtain calls.

At the height of her fame, between 1905 and 1914, she appeared in several German films.

== Artists' model ==
Artist Franz von Stuck (1863–1928) painted Saharet in a painting which hangs in the Landesmuseum in Oldenburg, Germany. In the portrait she has light blue eyes and brown hair. She is wearing a crimson jacket, white skirt, and red slippers. There is a red rose in her hair and her dress is abundant in lace and embroidery. Saharet has on a series of long necklaces with pendants. Another painting was done by Franz von Lenbach

== Marriages ==
Following her divorce from Ike Rose, Saharet married Fritz von Frantzius, banker, broker, and art critic in 1913. After only a few days, she left her new husband for her dancing partner Jose Florido, and they were divorced six months later. In June 1917, she married another theatrical agent, German-born Maxim Phidias Lowe. In January 1919 and October 1920, she applied as a resident of Brooklyn and wife of a naturalized citizen for a U.S. passport in order to accompany her husband on trips to Europe. In 1919 she still listed her occupation as "variety performer", but in 1920 she listed "housewife". The couple divorced in 1930, but she retained the name Clarice Saharet Lowe until her death in 1964 in Battle Creek, Michigan. By that time she was without family, but for a half brother in New York, as her daughter Carrie had committed suicide after a disastrous car accident in 1950.

== Filmography ==
- 1897: Saharet
- 1905: Saharet, Boléro
- 1912: Des Lebens Würfelspiel
- 1912: In a Golden Cage
- 1912: Hexenfeuer
- 1913: Mimosa-san
- 1914: On the Altar of Patriotism
