= Świecie nad Osą =

- Village
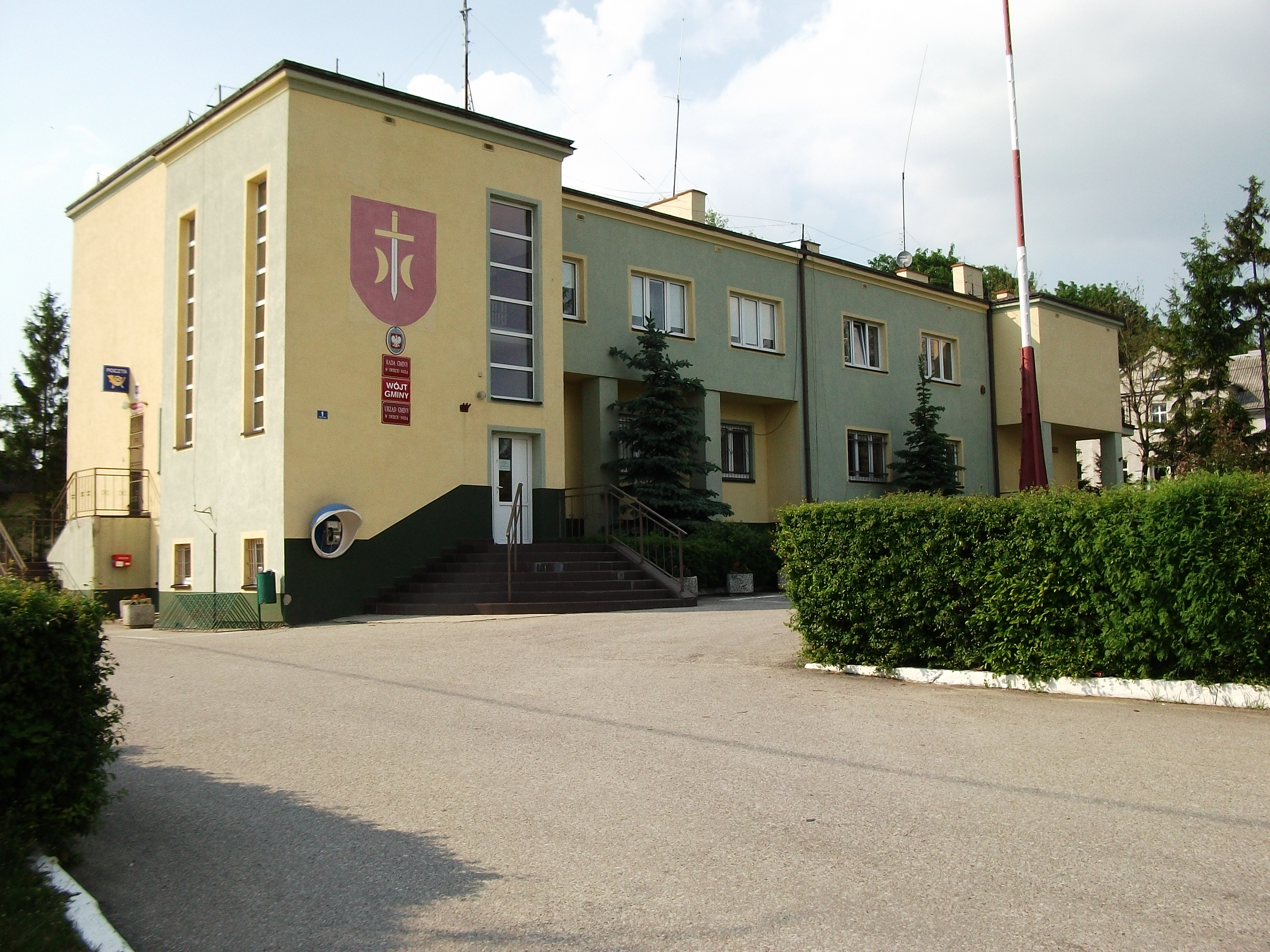
- Gmina Office in Świecie nad Osą

- Location within Poland
- Coordinates: 53°26′39″N 19°6′11″E
- Country: Poland
- Voivodeship: Kuyavian-Pomeranian
- County: Grudziądz
- Gmina: Świecie nad Osą
- Population: 870
- Time zone: UTC+1 (CET)
  - Summer (DST): UTC+2 (CEST)
- Vehicle registration: CGR

Świecie nad Osą (Polish: [ˈɕfjɛt͡ɕɛ nat ˈɔsɔ̃]) is a village in Grudziądz County, Kuyavian-Pomeranian Voivodeship, in north-central Poland. It is the seat of the gmina (administrative district) called Gmina Świecie nad Osą.

== History ==
During the German occupation of Poland (World War II), Świecie nad Osą was one of the sites of executions of Poles, carried out by the Germans in 1939 as part of the Intelligenzaktion.
