= Fritz von Frantzius =

Friedrich Wilhelm von Frantzius
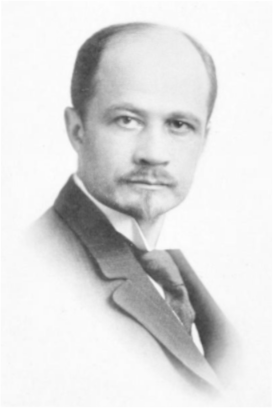
- Von Frantzius in 1913
- Born: May 17, 1865; Sawdin, West Prussia
- Died: January 8, 1917 (aged 51); Chicago
- Occupations: Banker, broker, bookkeeper
- Spouses: Margarete Sieber (m.1893, divorced); Saharet (m.1913–div.1913)

Friedrich Wilhelm "Fritz" von Frantzius (1865–1917) was a German-born American banker, broker and bookkeeper.

== Life and career ==
Von Frantzius was born on May 17, 1865, in Sawdin, West Prussia to parents Arthur (1823–1889) and Ida (Ehlert) von Frantzius (* 1831). He was educated at Marlenwerder and Graudenz in West Prussia from 1872 to 1885. He worked for three years in Berlin as a clerk of export and commission for the firm Ostberg & Loeser.

In 1888, von Frantzius came to the United States. He worked as a bookkeeper for Lipps & Button Silk Mills from 1888 to 1889, for Matthiessen & Hegeler Zinc Co. from 1889 to 1892, for Siemens & Halske Electric Co. from 1892 to 1893 and for J. F. Wollen-sac from 1893 to 1896. He then worked in the real estate business with S. E. Gross and Sam Brown Jr. from 1896 until he became a banker and broker in 1899 at the firm Von Frantzius & Krusemarck. In 1901 he began working with Ben Marcuse at the firm Von Frantzius & Co. On December 9, 1900, in Berlin, von Frantzius was selected as the Councilor of the Foreign Office and Councilor of the High Court for the International Court of Arbitration at The Hague.

He married Margarete Sieber on September 28, 1893, and they had two children, Hans Peter and Anne-Marie. On June 23, 1913, von Frantzius married his second wife, the Australian dancer Saharet, with whom he had long been obsessed. He made her vow to give up dancing forever, and she agreed to the condition. She stayed with him for four days before ripping up the marriage contract and pursuing a career in Europe.

Von Frantzius published a book in 1914, in response to an article written by Brander Matthews. The book was originally titled Germans as Exponents of Culture but later editions were titled The Book of Truth and Facts.

Von Frantzius died on January 8, 1917, in Chicago from heart disease. His estate was worth an estimated $11,250,000 at the time.
