= Kozłowo, Podlaskie Voivodeship =

Kozłowo
- Village
- Location within Poland
- Coordinates: 52°37′N 22°45′E
- Country: Poland
- Voivodeship: Podlaskie
- County: Siemiatycze
- Gmina: Grodzisk

Kozłowo [kɔˈzwɔvɔ] is a village in the administrative district of Gmina Grodzisk, within Siemiatycze County, Podlaskie Voivodeship, in north-eastern Poland.
