= Kozłowo, Pułtusk County =

Kozłowo
- Village
- Location within Poland
- Coordinates: 52°56′12″N 20°57′19″E
- Country: Poland
- Voivodeship: Masovian
- County: Pułtusk
- Gmina: Gzy

Kozłowo [kɔˈzwɔvɔ] is a village in the administrative district of Gmina Gzy, within Pułtusk County, Masovian Voivodeship, in east-central Poland.
