= Grudziądz County =

Grudziądz County Powiat grudziądzki
- County
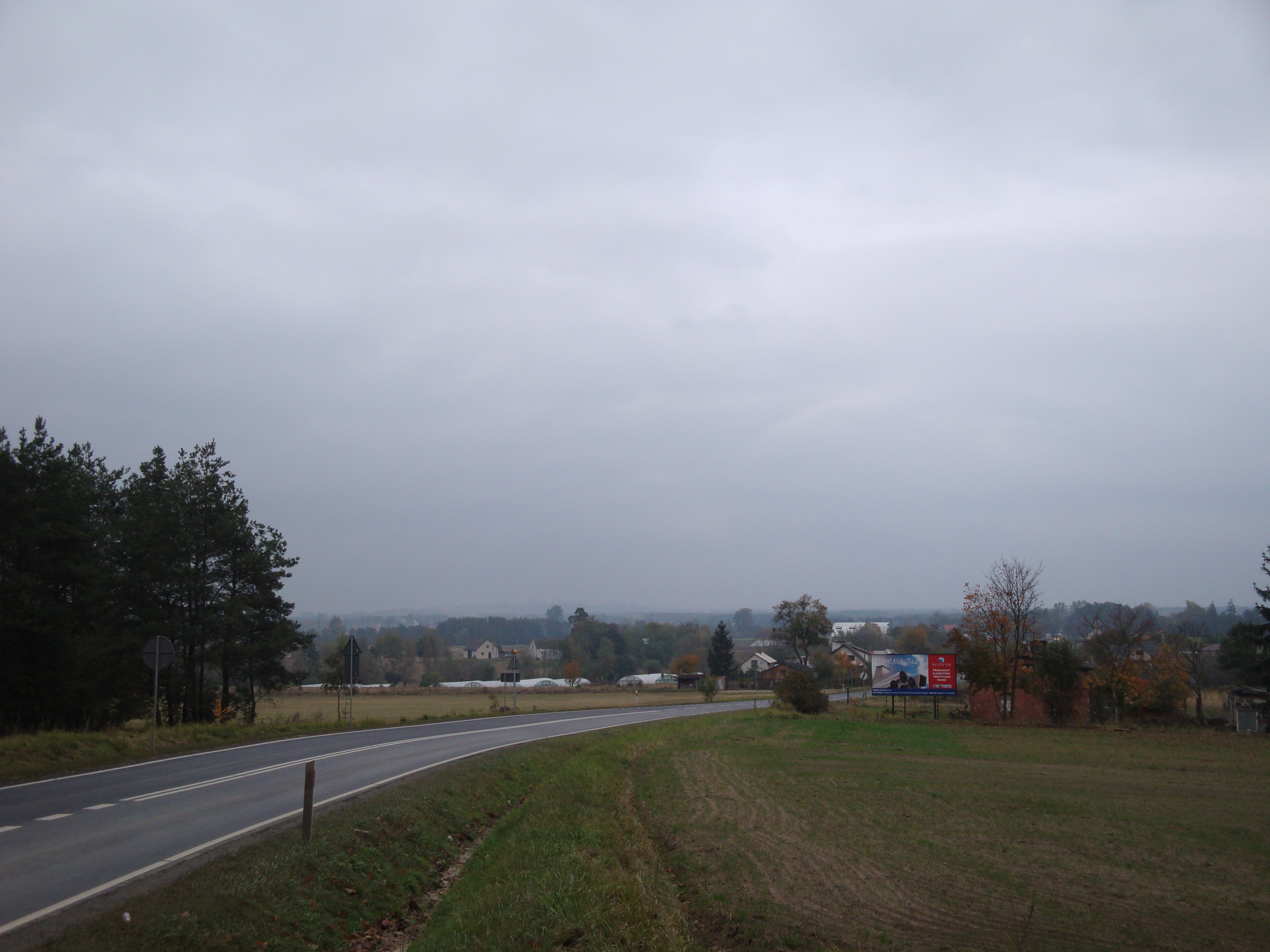

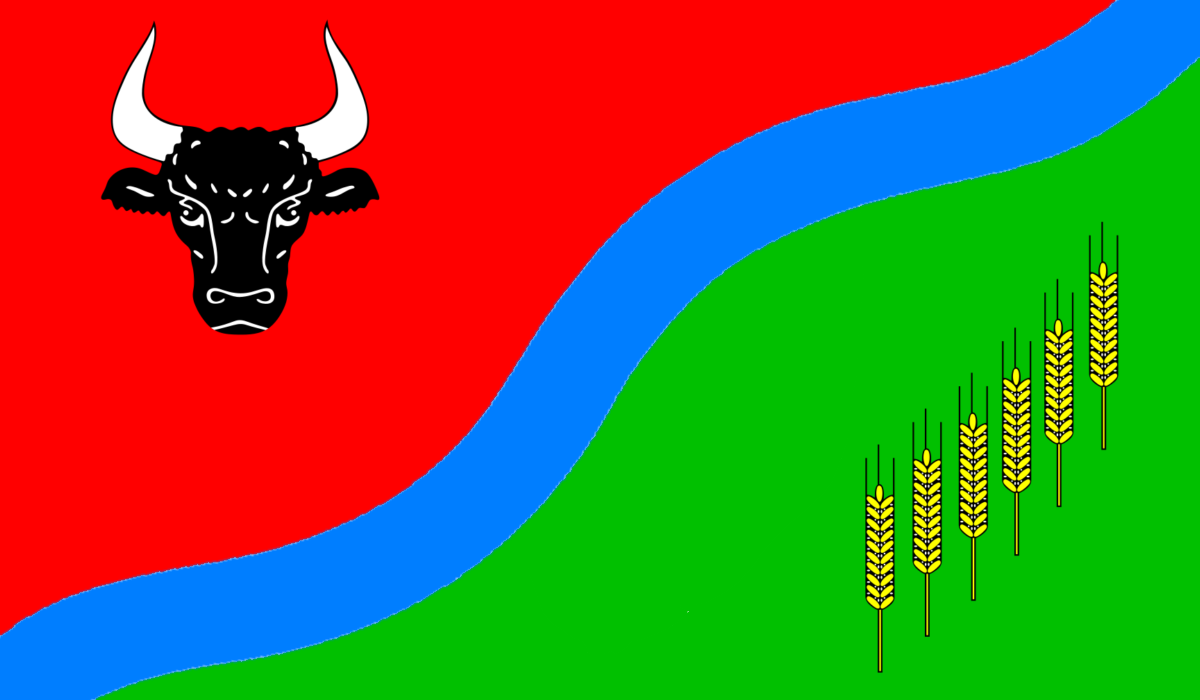
- Flag Coat of arms

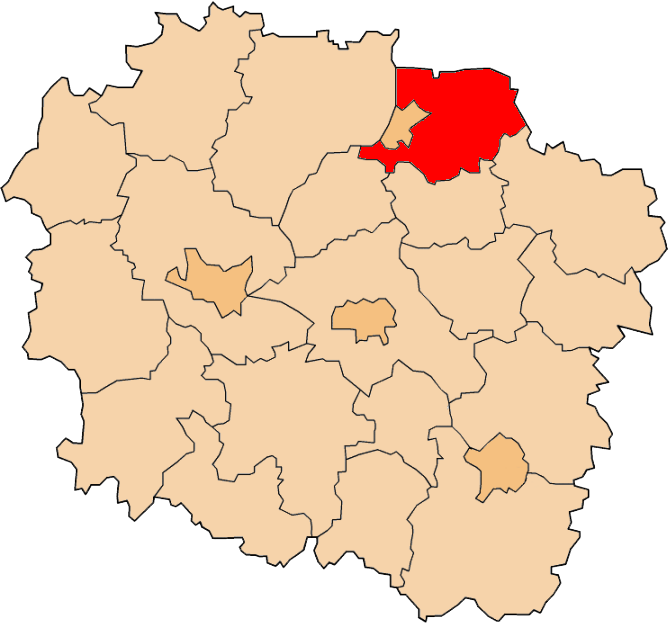
- Location within the voivodeship

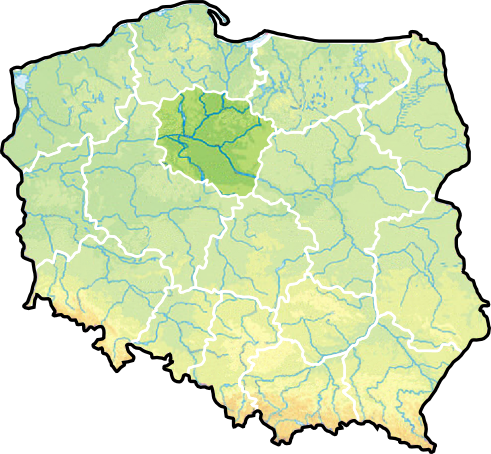
- Voivodeship on a map of Poland
- Coordinates (Grudziądz): 53°29′33″N 18°46′34″E
- Country: Poland
- Voivodeship: Kuyavian-Pomeranian
- Seat: Grudziądz
- Gminas: Total 6: Gmina Grudziądz; Gmina Gruta; Gmina Łasin; Gmina Radzyń Chełmiński; Gmina Rogóźno; Gmina Świecie nad Osą

Area
  - Total: 728.39 km^{2} (281.23 sq mi)

Population (2019)
  - Total: 40,181
  - Density: 55.164/km^{2} (142.87/sq mi)
  - Urban: 5,101
  - Rural: 35,080
- Car plates: CGR
- Website: www.powiatgrudziadzki.pl

Grudziądz County (Polish: powiat grudziądzki) is a unit of territorial administration and local government (powiat) in Kuyavian-Pomeranian Voivodeship, north-central Poland. It came into being on January 1, 1999, as a result of the Polish local government reforms passed in 1998. Its administrative seat is the city of Grudziądz, although the city is not part of the county (it constitutes a separate city county). The only towns in Grudziądz County are Łasin, which lies 21 km (13 mi) east of Grudziądz, and Radzyń Chełmiński, 16 km (10 mi) south-east of Grudziądz.

The county covers an area of 728.39 square kilometres (281.2 sq mi). As of 2019 its total population is 40,181, out of which the population of Łasin is 3,254, that of Radzyń Chełmiński is 1,847, and the rural population is 35,080.

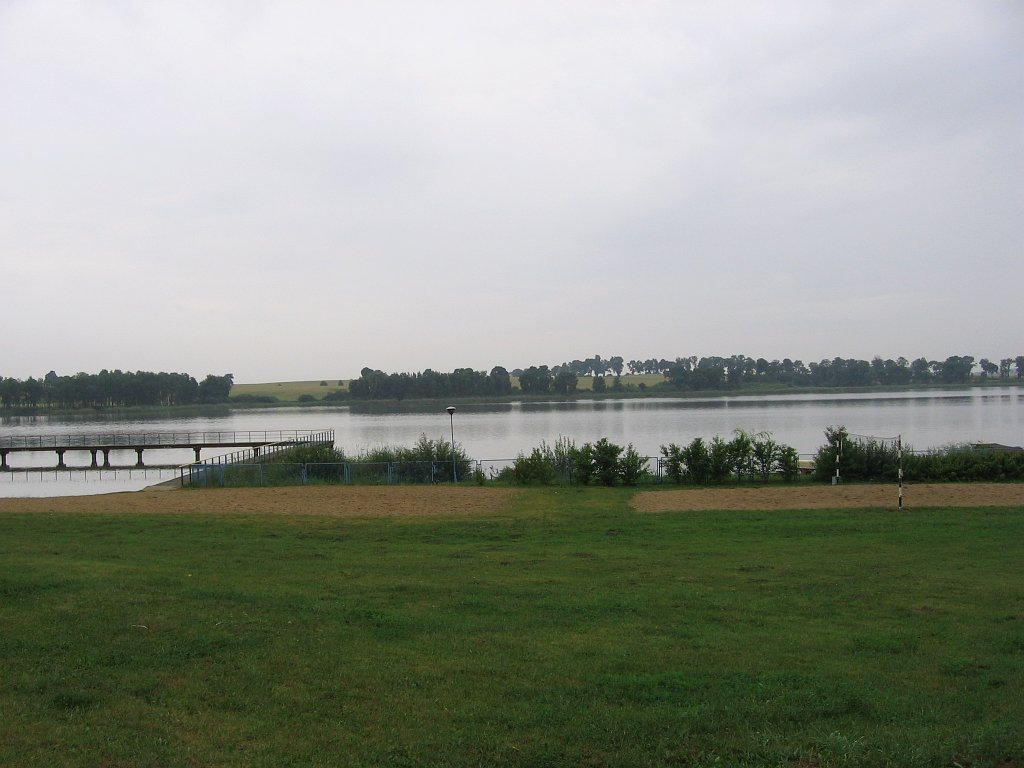
Łasin lake

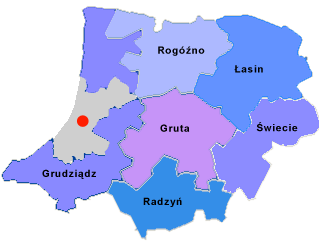
Division of Grudziądz County

== Neighbouring counties ==
Apart from the city of Grudziądz, Grudziądz County is also bordered by Kwidzyn County to the north, Iława County, Nowe Miasto County and Brodnica County to the east, Wąbrzeźno County to the south, and Chełmno County and Świecie County to the west.

== Administrative divisions ==
The county is subdivided into six gminas (two urban-rural and four rural). These are listed in the following table, in descending order of population.

Gmina	Type	Area (km^{2})	Population (2019)	Seat
Gmina Grudziądz	rural	166.9	12,812	Grudziądz *
Gmina Łasin	urban-rural	136.6	7,889	Łasin
Gmina Gruta	rural	123.8	6,413	Gruta
Gmina Radzyń Chełmiński	urban-rural	90.7	4,654	Radzyń Chełmiński
Gmina Rogóźno	rural	115.7	4,218	Rogóźno
Gmina Świecie nad Osą	rural	94.7	4,195	Świecie nad Osą
* seat not part of the gmina
