= Blizienko =

- Village
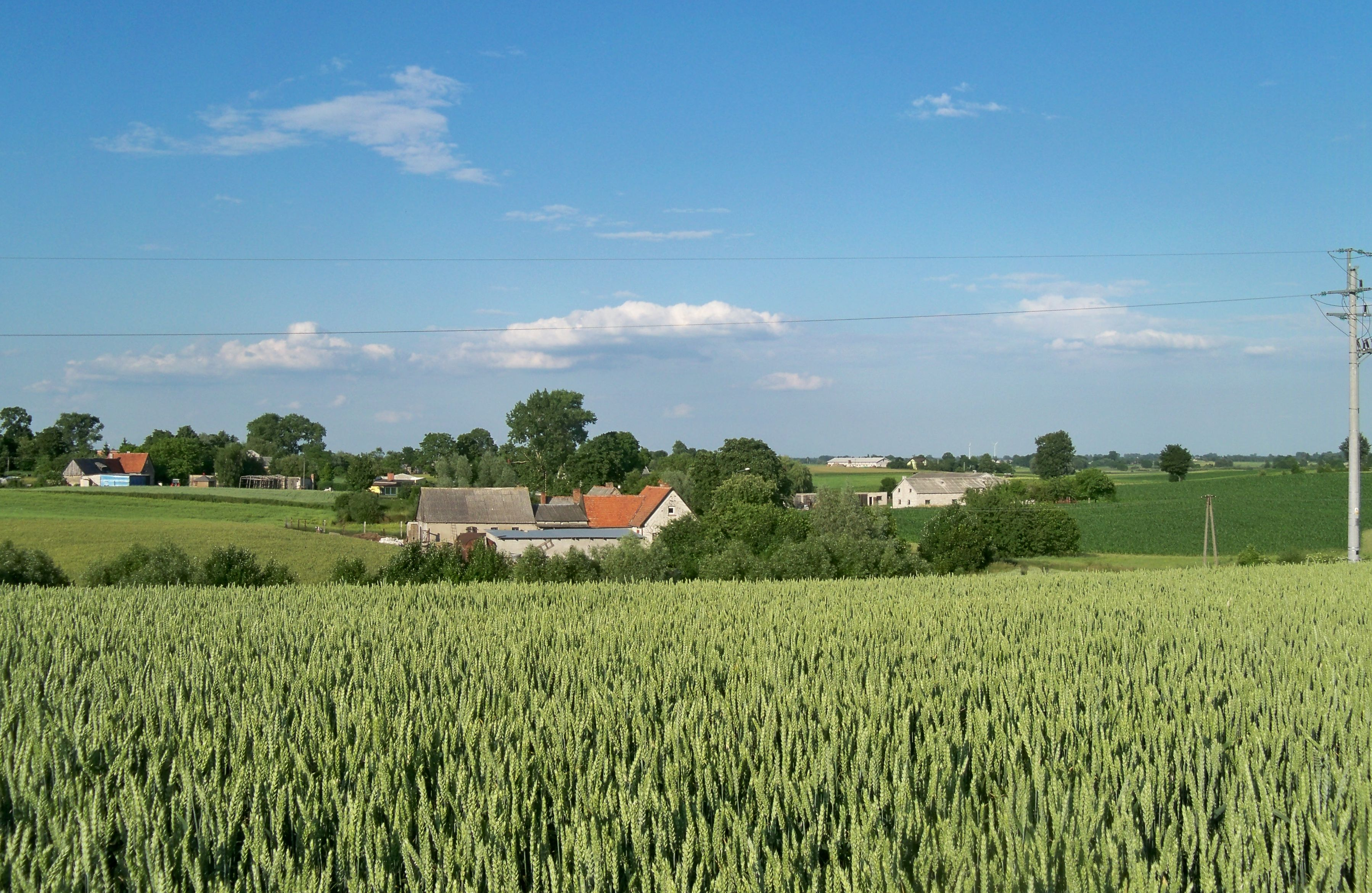
- Central part of the village

- Location within Poland
- Coordinates: 53°21′43″N 19°3′32″E
- Country: Poland
- Voivodeship: Kuyavian-Pomeranian
- County: Wąbrzeźno
- Gmina: Książki
- Time zone: UTC+1 (CET)
  - Summer (DST): UTC+2 (CEST)
- Vehicle registration: CWA

Blizienko [bliˈʑɛŋkɔ] is a village in the administrative district of Gmina Książki, within Wąbrzeźno County, Kuyavian-Pomeranian Voivodeship, in north-central Poland.

== History ==
Blizienko is a village located by the Radzyń Chełmiński–Jabłonowo Pomorskie road. It was mentioned in historical sources for the first time towards the end of the 13th century. It borders the village of Blizno, and the border between them runs near the bridge which separates two lakes. Blizienko was owned by Jan from Blizienko, and in the mid-14th century the Teutonic Order founded in its area a manor subordinate to the castle in Radzyń. Jan, the village leader of Blizienko (sołtys), gained sołectwo and 4 włóka of arable land free from rent in the village of Zielnowo from the Teutonic Order in 1365. A few interesting facts come from 1570 – there was an inn, also a brewer and a blacksmith lived in the village. Blizienko along with Blizno belonged to the parish in Rywałd. Both villages fell to Prussia following the First Partition of Poland in 1772, and were afterwards colonised by Germans. According to information from the second half of the 19th century, more than 100 out of 182 inhabitants were of Polish nationality. Following World War I, Poland regained independence and control of the village.

During the German occupation of Poland (World War II), several Poles from Blizienko were imprisoned by the Germans in the monastery in nearby Rywałd and eventually murdered in Stara Ruda (see: Intelligenzaktion).
