= Nazi repressions against the population of Grudziądz in 1939 =

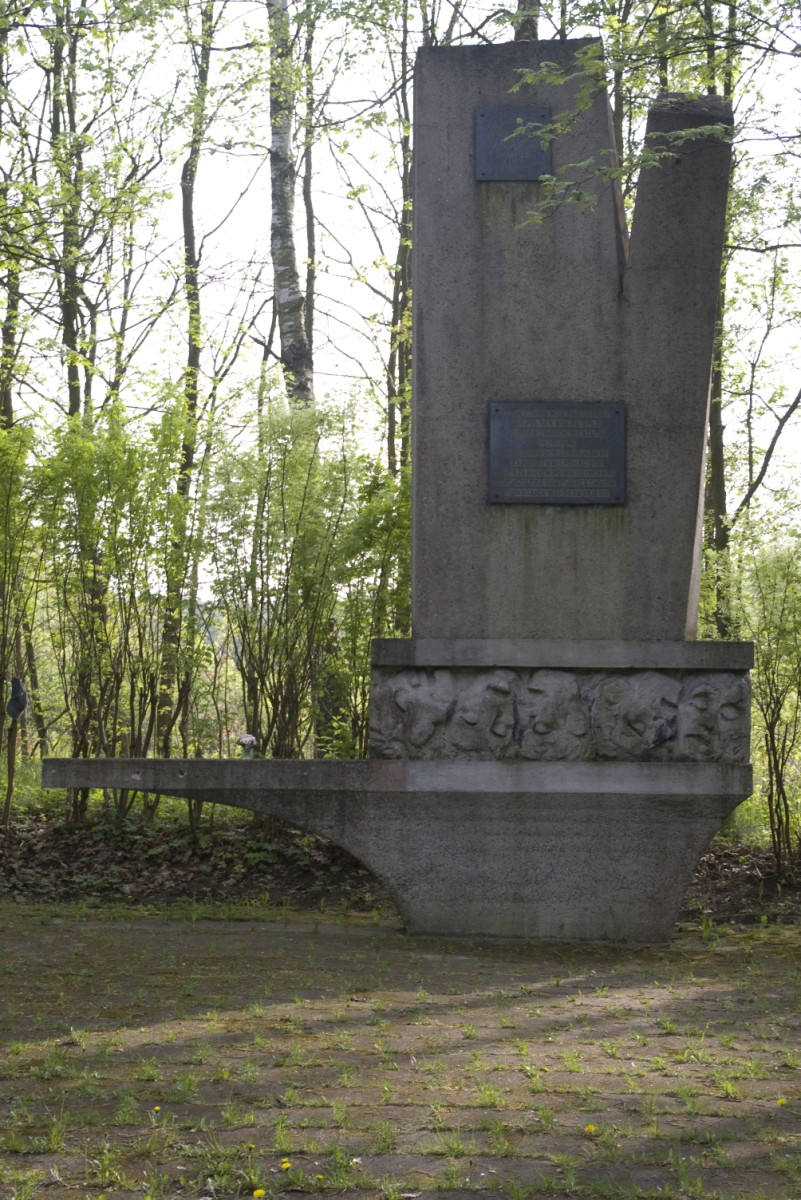
- Monument to the victims of executions at Księże Góry
- Location: Grudziądz
- Date: 1939
- Attack type: mass murder
- Deaths: 300 people
- Perpetrator: Nazi Germany

Nazi repressions against the population of Grudziądz in 1939 refers to the mass repressions imposed by Nazi German occupiers on the population of Grudziądz in the autumn of 1939.

As part of the "political cleansing of the territory" campaign, officers of the Einsatzgruppen (operational groups) and members of the paramilitary Selbstschutz arrested several thousand residents of Grudziądz and surrounding areas. At least 300 people were killed in secret and public executions carried out within the city or on the nearby Księże Góry. Most victims were representatives of the Polish social and intellectual elite, as well as individuals of Jewish nationality.

== Beginning of the German occupation ==
Grudziądz was captured by Wehrmacht units on 4 September 1939. Following the regular army, officers of Einsatzgruppe V – led by SS-Standartenführer Ernst Damzog – entered the city. (Note: Specifically, a subunit of this group, Einsatzkommando 1/V, operated in Grudziądz under the command of Heinz Gräfe (Böhler, Mallmann & Matthäus (2009, pp. 55–56)).) This special operational group (Einsatzgruppen) of the German security police and security service was tasked with "combating all elements hostile to the Reich and Germans behind the fighting troops" and "apprehending politically unreliable individuals", particularly those listed in the Special Prosecution Book – Poland. On 6 September, Einsatzgruppen officers conducted a series of searches in Grudziądz's public buildings. These included the offices of the Border Guard, border and police stations, and facilities of organizations promoting Polish identity. At the premises of the Riflemen's Association, they confiscated weapons and a membership file with photographs. In the following days, searches extended to a contact point of the Second Department of Polish General Staff and the buildings of the district and municipal courts. Private residences were also searched for weapons, often accompanied by widespread looting.

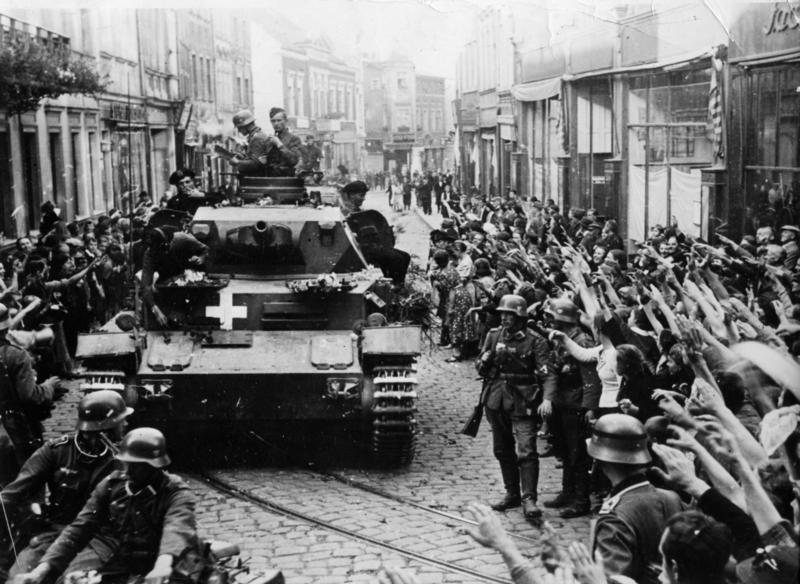
German troops entering Grudziądz, greeted by local Germans

On 7 September, 25 prominent citizens – clergymen, teachers, and other respected figures in Polish society – were detained as hostages. They were threatened with execution should any harm come to local Volksdeutsche, whom Polish authorities had interned and evacuated inland before the Wehrmacht's arrival. Only after the interned Germans returned home were the hostages released, though most were later rearrested and executed. On 9 September, the Germans arrested 65 Polish men of conscription age and interned another 20 individuals accused of pro-Polish agitation during the 1920 East Prussian plebiscite. Earlier, the occupation authorities ordered the destruction of the Independence Monument on Grudziądz's market square (4 September) and banned Polish Catholic priests from delivering sermons.

Repressions also targeted the Jewish population. On 4 September, the Einsatzgruppe V command appointed two representatives for Grudziądz's approximately 600-strong qahal, ordering them to compile a list of members and their assets within 14 hours. A contribution of 20,000 PLN was imposed on the Jews. On 6 September, posters were displayed citywide, summoning Jews and first- and second-degree mixed-race individuals (Mischlinge) to report to the Einsatzgruppe V headquarters at a school on 19 Młyńska Street. About 100 people complied and were immediately arrested. The detained Jews were robbed and then transported to an unknown location, likely murdered in nearby forests near the villages of Mniszek and Grupa.

Einsatzgruppe V operated around Grudziądz until approximately 21 September, after which it moved to central Poland. Shortly thereafter, a branch of Einsatzkommando 16 – a special operational group formed from the Gdańsk Gestapo – was established in the city (26 September). Its primary task was eliminating the Polish intelligentsia in occupied Pomerania. Additionally, German police, state, and party authorities quickly established themselves in occupied Grudziądz. Dr. Rudolf Reimers assumed the roles of Landrat of Grudziądz County and head of the local party organization (Kreisleiter), while Bruno Keller was appointed mayor of Grudziądz and leader of the city's Nazi Party cell. Meanwhile, the first Selbstschutz units – paramilitary formations composed of members of the German minority from prewar Poland – began forming in the city and surrounding areas. Dr. Joachim Gramse, a prewar cooperative activist from the Free City of Danzig, led the Grudziądz Selbstschutz.

By Hitler's decree of 8 October 1939, Grudziądz and its county were annexed to the Reich as part of the Kwidzyn Regierungsbezirk within the Reichsgau Danzig-West Prussia. On 19 October, Gauleiter Albert Forster of Gdańsk visited the city. At a rally for Volksdeutsche, he declared that "the Gdańsk-West Prussia province must become fully German in a short time, and Poles have no place here and should be expelled". He also expressed surprise that "Polish blood is not yet visible on the streets of this city, despite the murders committed there against Germans". Forster's speech triggered a large-scale repressive campaign against Poles. The next day, 20 October (a Sunday), Selbstschutz units mass-arrested Poles leaving churches, even storming one during a service. Individual arrests in homes continued in the following days.

== Extermination of the "Polish leadership class" ==
Between October 1939 and spring 1940, the Germans conducted a widespread extermination campaign in occupied Pomerania, primarily targeting the Polish intelligentsia. National Socialists blamed this group for the interwar Polonization policies in Gdańsk Pomerania and viewed it as the main obstacle to the rapid and complete Germanization of the region. During the so-called Intelligenzaktion, between 30,000 and 40,000 Pomeranian residents were murdered.

In Grudziądz, those detained under the Intelligenzaktion were initially held in the city's court prison on Budkiewicz Street. The number of arrests soon overwhelmed the facility, prompting the Selbstschutz to establish a transit camp for Poles in October 1939. Located in the Kresowy Boarding School at the intersection of Herzfeld and St. Wojciech streets, the camp was commanded by a local German, Kurt Götze. The camp held officials, social activists, doctors, merchants, members of pro-Polish organizations, lawyers, policemen, farmers, and nearly 150 Catholic priests from Grudziądz and nearby areas. It also housed Grudziądz teachers and about 100 students from the local teachers' seminary. Additionally, around 200 boys – residents of the boarding school – were interned there before being deported to Germany for forced labor. In total, between 4,000 and 5,000 people passed through the Grudziądz internment camp. Some detainees were also held in the casemates of the Grudziądz Fortress.

A Selbstschutz summary court operated within the camp, determining the fate of prisoners. Its members included Kurt Götze, Helmut Domke, Horst Kriedte, Hans Abromeit (a drugstore owner), and Paul Neuman (a barber). Based on its rulings, some prisoners were deported to concentration camps, a small number were released, and about 300 were executed. Those sentenced to death were typically taken to Księże Góry near Grudziądz, where Selbstschutz members shot them. In October and November 1939, several hundred people were killed there and buried in five mass graves, ranging from 4 to 24 meters in length. Victims were usually shot at the edge of pre-dug graves.

As early as September 1939, a priest and a sexton from Dąbrówka Królewska were executed at Księże Góry. Other victims included Father Antoni Bieleń, Father Bronisław Bojułka, and Father Józef Gołębiewski – Jesuits from Grudziądz (Note: In autumn 1939, 13 Catholic clergymen from Grudziądz were arrested, including three Jesuits. 12, including all three Jesuits, were murdered (Bojarska (1972, p. 99)).) (killed on 5 October); Władysław Grobelny – a journalist, publisher, and crafts activist (killed on 27 October); Adam Korzeniewski – co-owner of the W. Korzeniewski S.A. Department Store (killed in November); and teachers Alojzy Błaszkowski, Feliks Gawarzycki, and Bronisław Zinkel. Likely also executed at Księże Góry were Józef Maślanka (director of the municipal hospital), Alojzy Szczerbicki (pharmacist), Lina Chlewska (pharmacist's wife), and Helena Hanczewska and Anna Korzeniewska (merchants' wives).

Executions also occurred in other remote locations near Grudziądz. On 11 November 1939, Selbstschutz executed 25 members of the Polish intelligentsia – including 10 teachers, 4 Catholic priests, and 4 women – at the Grudziądz Fortress. Additionally, 37 Grudziądz residents were executed near the former forester's lodge in the city's Municipal Park.

On 29 October 1939, a Selbstschutz unit publicly executed 10 hostages at a square near Józef Piłsudski Avenue, opposite the Fire Brigade building. The victims included Józef Madej (teacher), Walenty Jakubowski (county official), (Note: Jakubowski was accused of obstructing Volksdeutsche emigration to the Reich during the prewar period (Bojarska (1972, p. 115)).) several military personnel, a sports activist, and railway, court, and police officials – all members of the Polish Western Union. Witnesses reported that the condemned shouted "Poland has not yet perished!" before dying. Those still alive were finished off with pistol shots. The execution was a reprisal for alleged Polish posters inciting resistance against the Germans.

Executions near Grudziądz ceased by late November 1939. However, residents were also killed at more distant sites. Many arrested – including the 100 Jews detained on 6 September 1939 – were shot in Mniszek and Grupa. Reports also document the execution of 50 Scouts from Grudziądz in the Skrwileńsk forests near Rypin.

Mass executions also occurred elsewhere in Grudziądz County. In the forests near Białochowo, SS and Selbstschutz members killed about 200 people. Near Łasin, nearly 150 residents of surrounding areas were murdered. Poles arrested in Radzyń Chełmiński and nearby villages were held at the Capuchin Monastery in Rywałd, where 200 members of the "Polish leadership class" were killed in the forest near Stara Ruda in autumn 1939.

== Postwar period ==
In October 1945, exhumation work was conducted at the execution site on Księże Góry. The recovered remains of German terror victims were solemnly buried at Grudziądz's municipal cemetery on Cmentarna Street. That same year, the Polish Western Union initiated the construction of a wooden monument at the current Piłsudski Street to honor the 10 hostages executed on 29 October 1939. On 22 July 1958, a stone monument by sculptor Ignacy Zelek was unveiled there. On 6 March 1971, a monument honoring the Poles murdered at Księże Góry, designed and built by Henryk Rasmus, was dedicated.

After the war, several low-ranking Grudziądz Selbstschutz members faced Polish courts. Fritz Kühn, Fritz Lenz, Alfons Schlitkus, and Hans Welke were sentenced to death. However, most perpetrators of the autumn 1939 crimes in Grudziądz escaped justice. Heinz Gräfe, commander of Einsatzkommando 1/V (a subunit of Einsatzgruppe V active in Grudziądz, Brodnica, and Nowe Miasto Lubawskie), died in a car accident in January 1944. Ernst Damzog, head of Einsatzgruppe V, died in July 1945. No Grudziądz Selbstschutz members were prosecuted in West Germany postwar.

== Bibliography ==
- Bierut, Henryk (1999). Martyrologia grudziądzan podczas okupacji hitlerowskiej [Martyrology of Grudziądz Residents During the Nazi Occupation] (in Polish). Grudziądz: Wydawnictwo Komitetu Ochrony Pamięci Walk i Męczeństwa w Grudziądzu.
- Böhler, Jochen; Mallmann, Klaus-Michael; Matthäus, Jürgen (2009). Einsatzgruppen w Polsce [Einsatzgruppen in Poland] (in Polish). Warsaw: Bellona. ISBN 978-83-11-11588-0.
- Bojarska, Barbara (1972). Eksterminacja inteligencji polskiej na Pomorzu Gdańskim (wrzesień-grudzień 1939) [Extermination of the Polish Intelligentsia in Gdańsk Pomerania (September–December 1939)] (in Polish). Poznań: Instytut Zachodni.
- Wardzyńska, Maria (2009). Był rok 1939. Operacja niemieckiej policji bezpieczeństwa w Polsce. Intelligenzaktion [The Year Was 1939: Operation of the German Security Police in Poland. Intelligenzaktion] (in Polish). Warsaw: Instytut Pamięci Narodowej. ISBN 978-83-7629-063-8.
