= Blizno, Kuyavian-Pomeranian Voivodeship =

Blizno
- Village
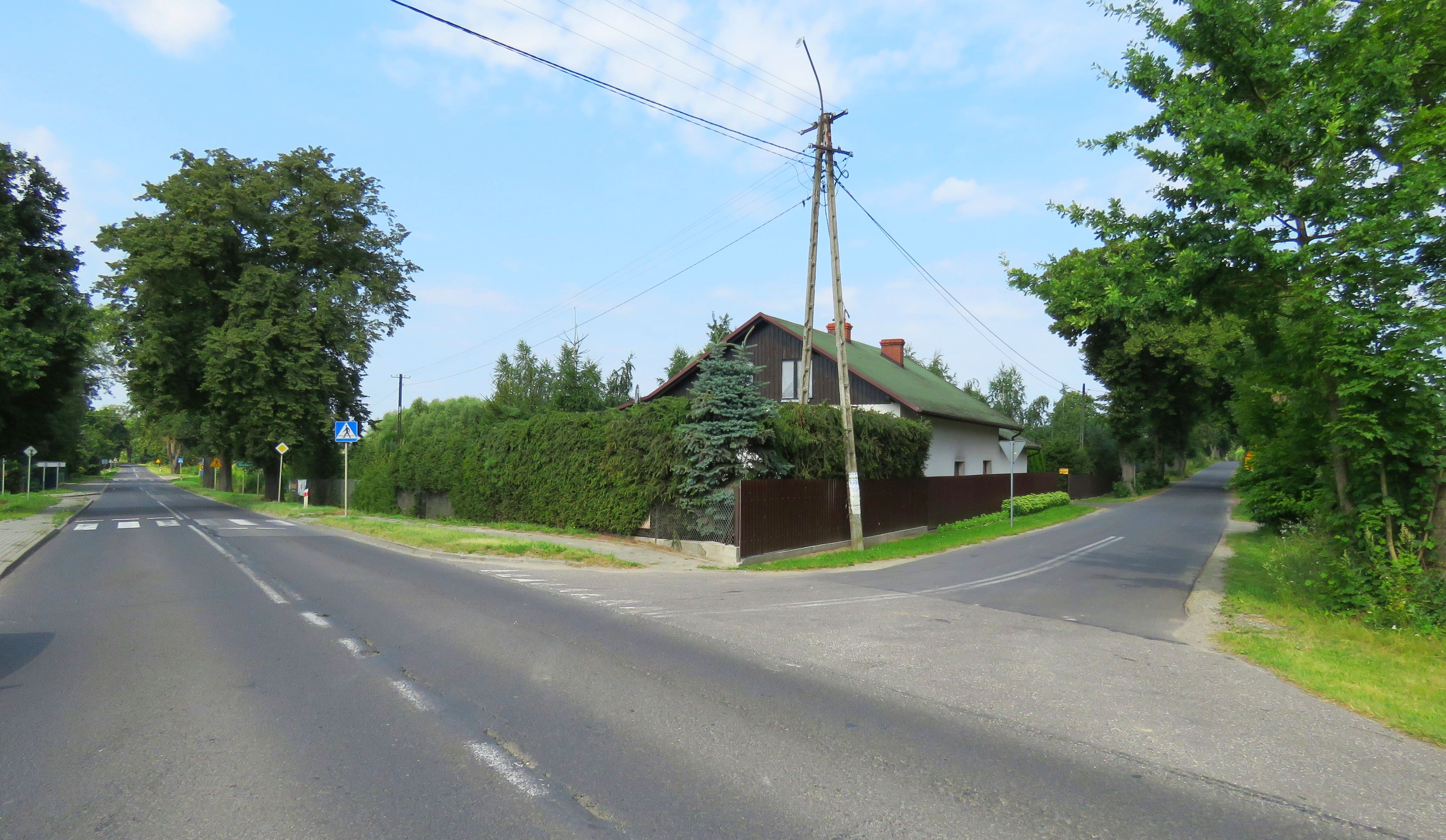

- Location within Poland
- Coordinates: 53°22′51″N 19°4′36″E
- Country: Poland
- Voivodeship: Kuyavian-Pomeranian
- County: Wąbrzeźno
- Gmina: Książki
- Time zone: UTC+1 (CET)
  - Summer (DST): UTC+2 (CEST)
- Vehicle registration: CWA

Blizno [ˈbliznɔ] is a village in the administrative district of Gmina Książki, within Wąbrzeźno County, Kuyavian-Pomeranian Voivodeship, in north-central Poland.

== History ==
Blizno is a village located by the Radzyń Chełmiński–Jabłonowo Pomorskie road. It was mentioned in historical sources for the first time towards the end of the 13th century. It borders the village of Blizienko, and the border between them runs near the bridge which separates two lakes. Meinhard Von Queufurt, the country master of the Order of Teutonic Knights, granted 34 włóka in Blizno to a man named Mirogniew. Blizno had 8 free włóka, but it was partially abandoned after the war in 1414. Eight local peasants were killed and the Teutonic Order estimated the losses at 1400 grzywna (a monetary unit). A few interesting facts come from 1570 – there was an inn, also a brewer and a blacksmith lived in the village. Augustyn, the village leader, was cultivating 8 włóka free from rent, according to the old privilege. Polish King Sigismund II Augustus granted the village leader a right to fish in lake Jędro, collect dry wood in the forest and a right to profits from the inn. Blizno along with Blizienko belonged to the parish in Rywałd. Both villages fell to Prussia following the First Partition of Poland in 1772, and were afterwards colonised by Germans. According to information from the second half of the 19th century, only 29 out of 308 inhabitants of Blizno were Poles. However, in Blizienko there were more than 100 out of 182 inhabitants were of Polish nationality. Following World War I, Poland regained independence and control of the village.

During the German occupation of Poland (World War II), several Poles from Blizno were imprisoned by the Germans in the monastery in nearby Rywałd and eventually murdered in Stara Ruda (see: Intelligenzaktion).
