= Mazanki (disambiguation) =

The mazanki is a Czech folk musical instrument.

Mazanki may also refer to the following places in Poland:

- Mazanki, Kuyavian-Pomeranian Voivodeship (north-central Poland)
- Mazanki, Warmian-Masurian Voivodeship (north-east Poland)
