= Gołębiewo =

Gołębiewo may refer to the following places:

- Gołębiewo, Kuyavian-Pomeranian Voivodeship (north-central Poland)
- Gołębiewo, Pomeranian Voivodeship (north Poland)
- Gołębiewo, West Pomeranian Voivodeship (north-west Poland)
