= Czeczewo =

Czeczewo may refer to the following places:

- Czeczewo, Kuyavian-Pomeranian Voivodeship (north-central Poland)
- Czeczewo, Pomeranian Voivodeship (north Poland)
- Czeczewo, West Pomeranian Voivodeship (north-west Poland)
