= Zielnowo, Kuyavian-Pomeranian Voivodeship =

Zielnowo
- Village
- Location within Poland
- Coordinates: 53°22′N 18°52′E
- Country: Poland
- Voivodeship: Kuyavian-Pomeranian
- County: Grudziądz
- Gmina: Radzyń Chełmiński
- Time zone: UTC+1 (CET)
  - Summer (DST): UTC+2 (CEST)
- Vehicle registration: CGR

Zielnowo [ʑɛlˈnɔvɔ] is a village in the administrative district of Gmina Radzyń Chełmiński, within Grudziądz County, Kuyavian-Pomeranian Voivodeship, in north-central Poland.

== History ==
During the German occupation of Poland (World War II), several Poles from Zielnowo were imprisoned by the Germans in the monastery in nearby Rywałd and eventually murdered in Stara Ruda (see: Intelligenzaktion).
