= Zaskocz =

- Village
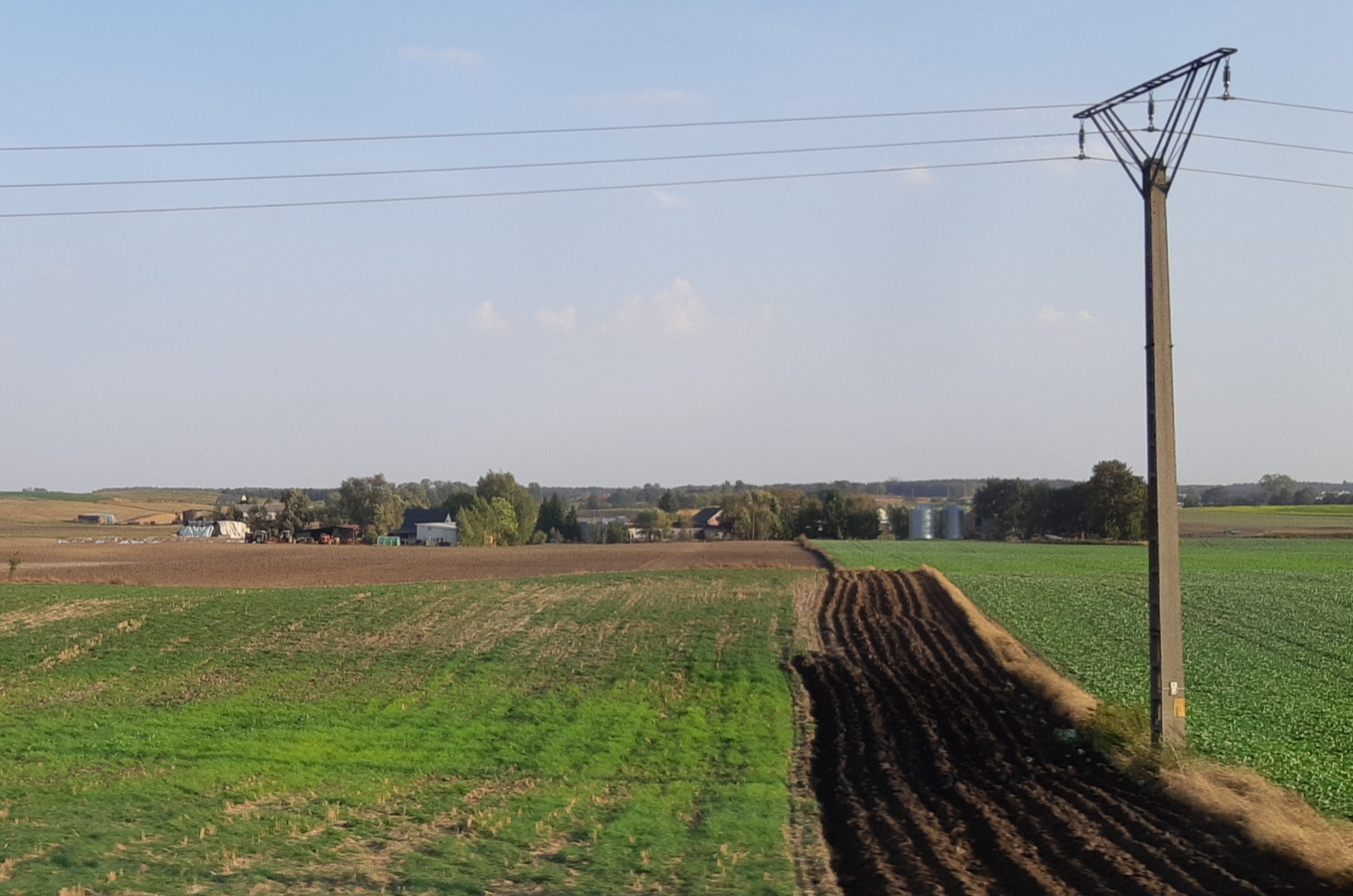

- Location within Poland
- Coordinates: 53°18′N 19°1′E
- Country: Poland
- Voivodeship: Kuyavian-Pomeranian
- County: Wąbrzeźno
- Gmina: Książki
- Population: 430

Zaskocz [ˈzaskɔt͡ʂ] is a village in the administrative district of Gmina Książki, within Wąbrzeźno County, Kuyavian-Pomeranian Voivodeship, in north-central Poland.

== History ==
From the beginning of the 15th century, it was a feudal land belonging to Jan Cegenberg (Jan from Cymbark). In 1410 the fire completely destroyed the estate and the land (30 włóka) was lying fallow for a long time. In September 1628 the village was severely damaged by Swedes who were marching on Brodnica along Radzyń – Zaskocz route. During the Second Swedish War 1655-1660 Zaskocz and Łopatki fell prey to the fire. However, fertile soil attracted new settlers. In 1682 the village had three owners: Znaniecki, Strachowski and Pawłowski. In 1704 Pawłowski became the owner of Zaskocz. He added some land to it and called the whole “Zaskocz”. In 1784 the estate covered 40 włóka of arable and grazing land, 22 włóka of not used pasture, as well as 8 włóka of forest. The village consisted of: one dwelling house with outbuildings, a distillery, a brewery, an orchard and three vegetable gardens, one manor, a roadside inn, a windmill, two carp ponds and 24 workers’ homesteads which were very poor.
