= Gmina Radzyń Chełmiński =

Gmina Radzyń Chełmiński Radzyń Chełmiński Commune
- Gmina
- Coat of arms
- Interactive map of Gmina Radzyń Chełmiński
- Coordinates (Radzyń Chełmiński): 53°23′8″N 18°56′11″E
- Country: Poland
- Voivodeship: Kuyavian-Pomeranian
- County: Grudziądz County
- Seat: Radzyń Chełmiński

Area
  - Total: 90.7 km^{2} (35.0 sq mi)

Population (2006)
  - Total: 4,917
  - Density: 54.2/km^{2} (140/sq mi)
  - Urban: 1,915
  - Rural: 3,002
- Website: http://www.radzynchelminski.pl/

Gmina Radzyń Chełmiński is an urban-rural gmina (administrative district) in Grudziądz County, Kuyavian-Pomeranian Voivodeship, in north-central Poland. Its seat is the town of Radzyń Chełmiński, which lies approximately 16 kilometres (10 mi) south-east of Grudziądz and 45 km (28 mi) north-east of Toruń.

The gmina covers an area of 90.7 square kilometres (35.0 sq mi), and as of 2006 its total population is 4,917 (out of which the population of Radzyń Chełmiński amounts to 1,915, and the population of the rural part of the gmina is 3,002).

== Villages ==
Apart from the town of Radzyń Chełmiński, Gmina Radzyń Chełmiński contains the villages and settlements of Czeczewo, Dębieniec, Gawłowice, Gołębiewo, Gziki, Kneblowo, Mazanki, Nowy Dwór, Radzyń-Wieś, Radzyń-Wybudowanie, Rozental, Rywałd, Stara Ruda, Szumiłowo, Wymysłowo, Zakrzewo and Zielnowo.

== Neighbouring gminas ==
Gmina Radzyń Chełmiński is bordered by the gminas of Grudziądz, Gruta, Książki, Płużnica, Świecie nad Osą and Wąbrzeźno.
