= Szczuplinki, Kuyavian-Pomeranian Voivodeship =

Szczuplinki
- Village
- Location within Poland
- Coordinates: 53°21′N 18°59′E
- Country: Poland
- Voivodeship: Kuyavian-Pomeranian
- County: Wąbrzeźno
- Gmina: Książki
- Population: 170

Szczuplinki [ʂt͡ʂuˈpliŋki] is a village in the administrative district of Gmina Książki, within Wąbrzeźno County, Kuyavian-Pomeranian Voivodeship, in north-central Poland.

== History ==
The first information about Szczuplinki dates back to 1268. It was when Chełmno Land (ziemia chełmińska) was raided by Prussians. Invaders burnt a fortification belonging to Cippel, a liege knight. Jeroschin, a chronicler, in a document dating from 1335 spells Cippel's name as Zipfil. According to the oldest sources of the Order of the Teutonic Knights, the village Szczuplinki (called Czhippiln) covered about 13 włóka. In a book from 1444, in which damage and losses were written down, the village is called Schippelsdorf. It was owned by Johannes von Czyppelyn (Jan from Szczuplinki). Other information about that settlement dates from 1667, so from a church inspection of the canon Strzesz in a church in Radzyń. It states that the village was the property of Łukasz Trzciński, a country gentleman. During the Swedish invasion of Poland in 1655–1660, the village was completely destroyed. It was owned by Tomasz Czapski in 1776. Its next owner was Jakub Zaleski. Konstancja Małachowska (maiden name Zaleska) granted the estate to farmers who lived there in perpetual lease. The village was sold to the descendants of leaseholders in 1835. Szczuplinki became a part of Poland once again in 1920.
