= Wymysłowo, Grudziądz County =

Wymysłowo
- Village
- Location within Poland
- Coordinates: 53°22′25″N 18°57′15″E
- Country: Poland
- Voivodeship: Kuyavian-Pomeranian
- County: Grudziądz
- Gmina: Radzyń Chełmiński
- Population: 120

Wymysłowo [vɨmɨˈswɔvɔ] is a village in the administrative district of Gmina Radzyń Chełmiński, within Grudziądz County, Kuyavian-Pomeranian Voivodeship, in north-central Poland.
