= Gziki, Kuyavian-Pomeranian Voivodeship =

Gziki
- Village
- Location within Poland
- Coordinates: 53°20′37″N 18°53′23″E
- Country: Poland
- Voivodeship: Kuyavian-Pomeranian
- County: Grudziądz
- Gmina: Radzyń Chełmiński

Gziki [ˈɡʑiki] is a village in the administrative district of Gmina Radzyń Chełmiński, within Grudziądz County, Kuyavian-Pomeranian Voivodeship, in north-central Poland.
