= Gmina Książki =

Gmina Książki Książki Commune
- Gmina
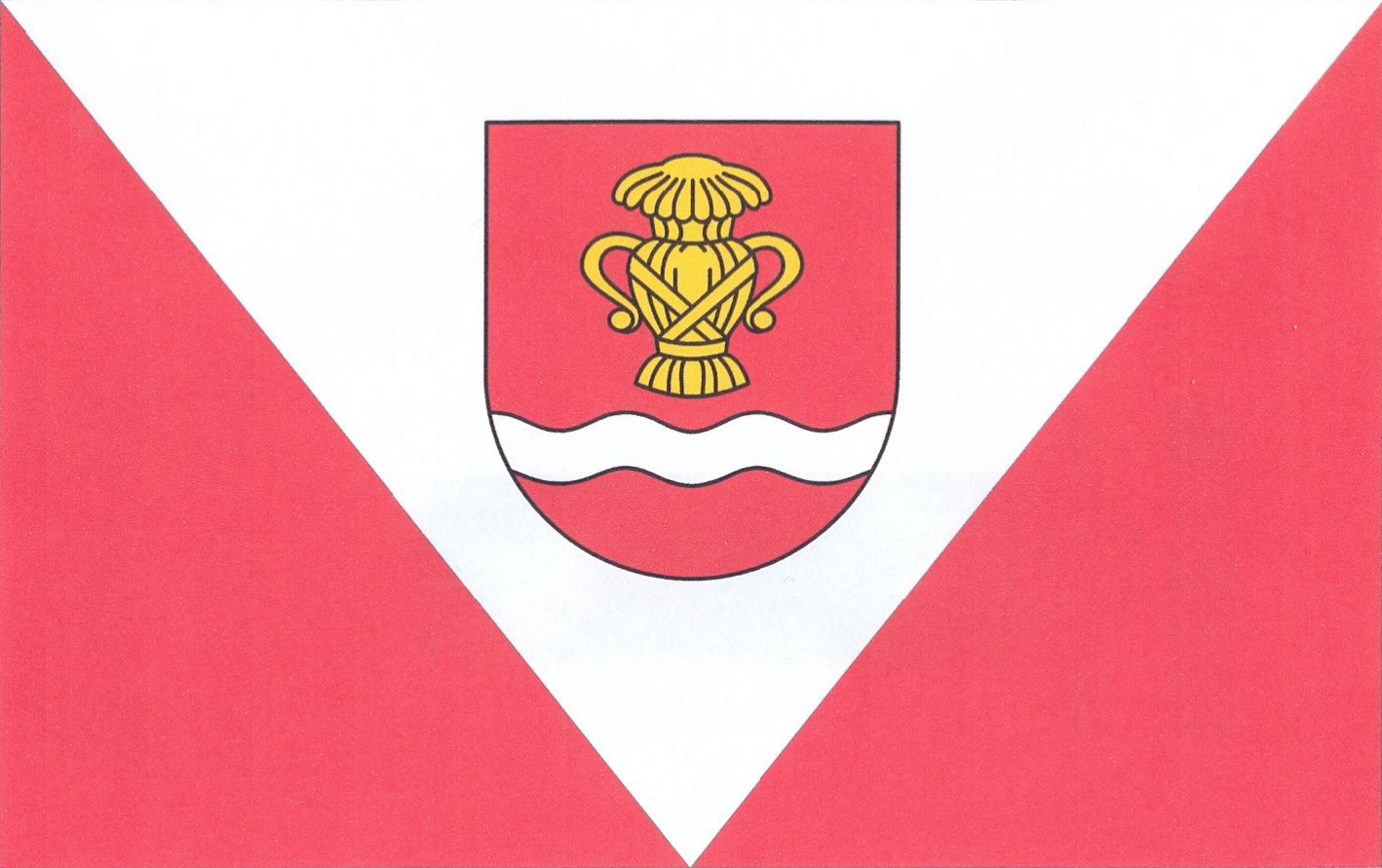
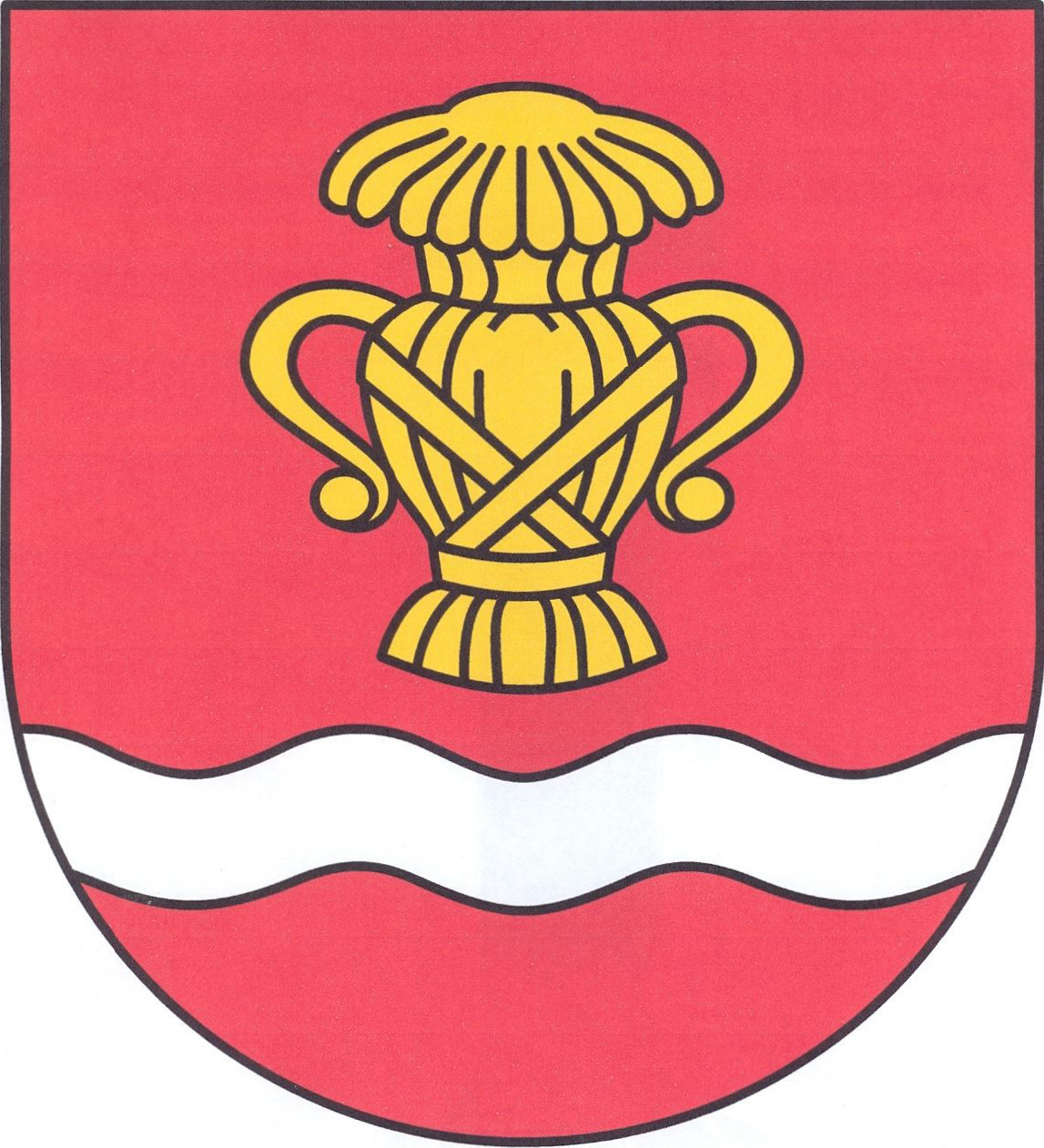
- Flag Coat of arms
- Interactive map of Gmina Książki
- Coordinates (Książki): 53°20′N 19°4′E
- Country: Poland
- Voivodeship: Kuyavian-Pomeranian
- County: Wąbrzeźno
- Seat: Książki

Area
  - Total: 86.54 km^{2} (33.41 sq mi)

Population (2006)
  - Total: 4,299
  - Density: 49.68/km^{2} (128.7/sq mi)
- Website: https://www.gminaksiazki.pl//

Gmina Książki is a rural gmina (administrative district) in Wąbrzeźno County, Kuyavian-Pomeranian Voivodeship, in north-central Poland. Its seat is the village of Książki, which lies approximately 10 kilometres (6 mi) north-east of Wąbrzeźno and 45 km (28 mi) north-east of Toruń.

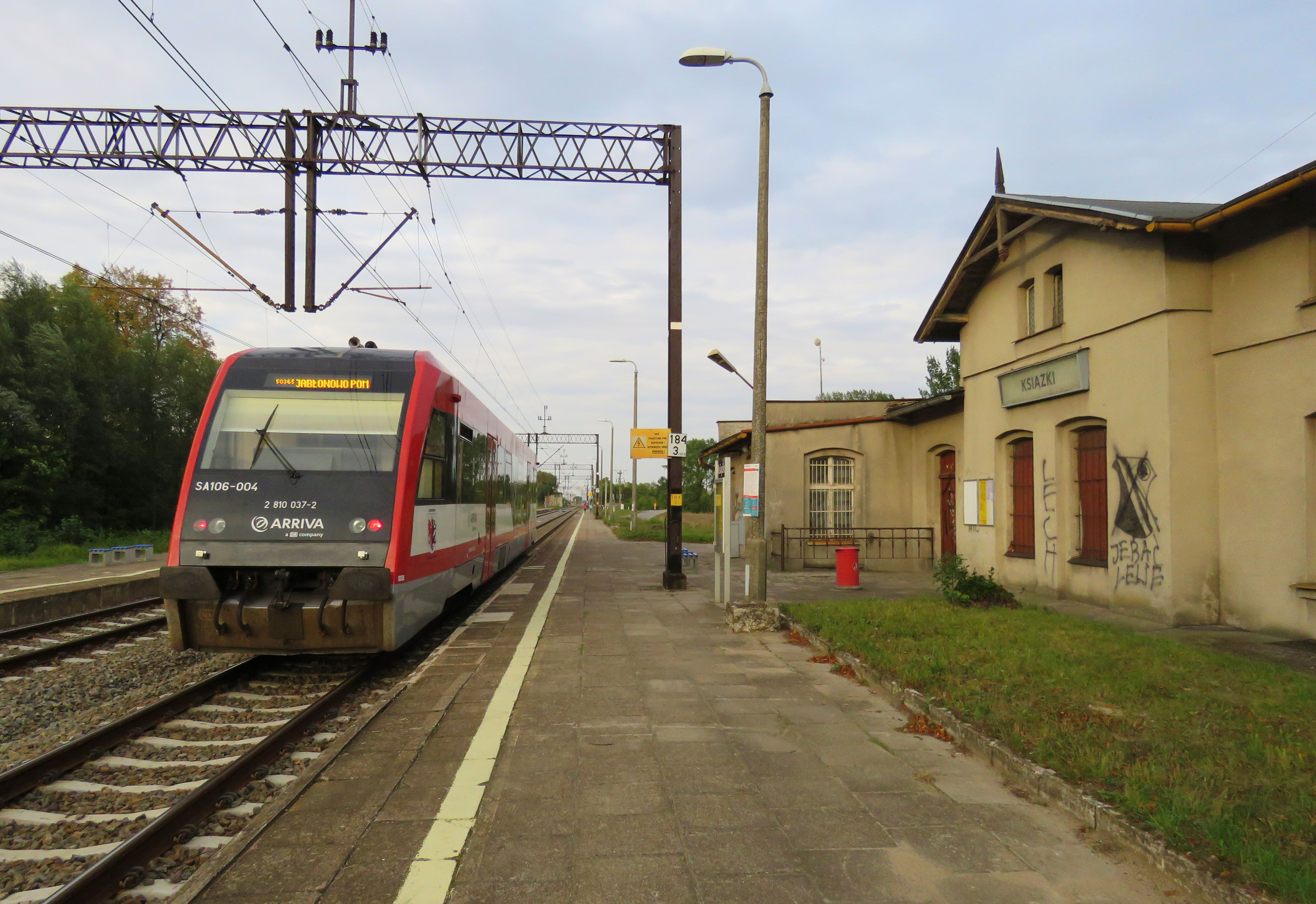

The gmina covers an area of 86.54 square kilometres (33.4 sq mi), and as of 2006 its total population is 4,299.

== Villages ==
Gmina Książki contains the villages and settlements of Blizienko, Blizno, Brudzawki, Książki, Łopatki, Osieczek, Szczuplinki and Zaskocz.

== Neighbouring gminas ==
Gmina Książki is bordered by the gminas of Bobrowo, Dębowa Łąka, Jabłonowo Pomorskie, Radzyń Chełmiński, Świecie nad Osą and Wąbrzeźno.
