= Szumiłowo =

- Village
- Location within Poland
- Coordinates: 53°24′30″N 18°57′41″E
- Country: Poland
- Voivodeship: Kuyavian-Pomeranian
- County: Grudziądz
- Gmina: Radzyń Chełmiński

Szumiłowo [ʂumiˈwɔvɔ] is a village in the administrative district of Gmina Radzyń Chełmiński, within Grudziądz County, Kuyavian-Pomeranian Voivodeship, in north-central Poland.
