= Radzyń-Wybudowanie =

- Village
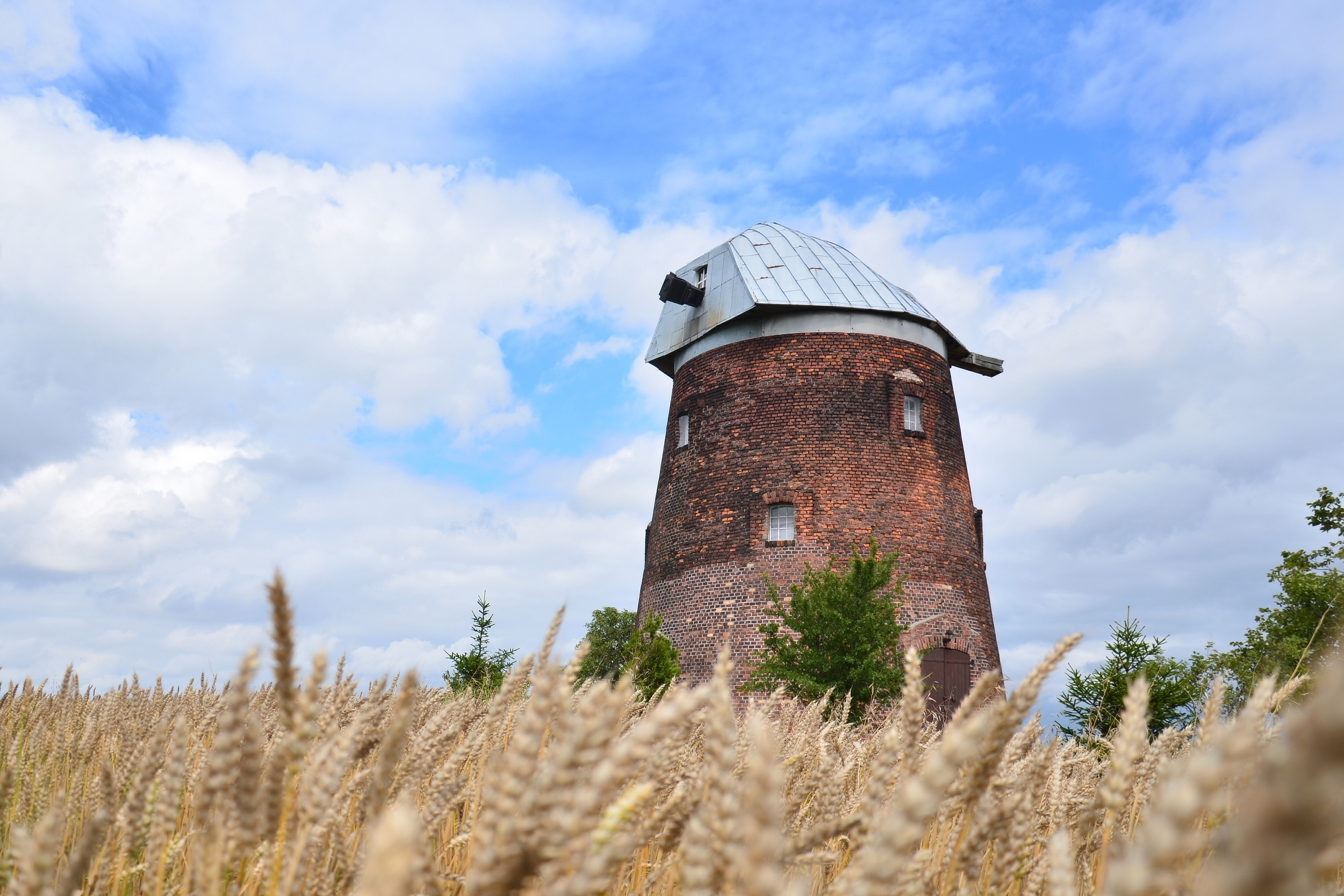
- View of Radzyń-Wybudowanie village

- Location within Poland
- Coordinates: 53°21′38″N 18°56′05″E
- Country: Poland
- Voivodeship: Kuyavian-Pomeranian
- County: Grudziądz
- Gmina: Radzyń Chełmiński

Radzyń-Wybudowanie [ˈrad͡zɨɲ vɨbudɔˈvaɲɛ] is a village in the administrative district of Gmina Radzyń Chełmiński, within Grudziądz County, Kuyavian-Pomeranian Voivodeship, in north-central Poland.
