= Dębieniec =

- Village
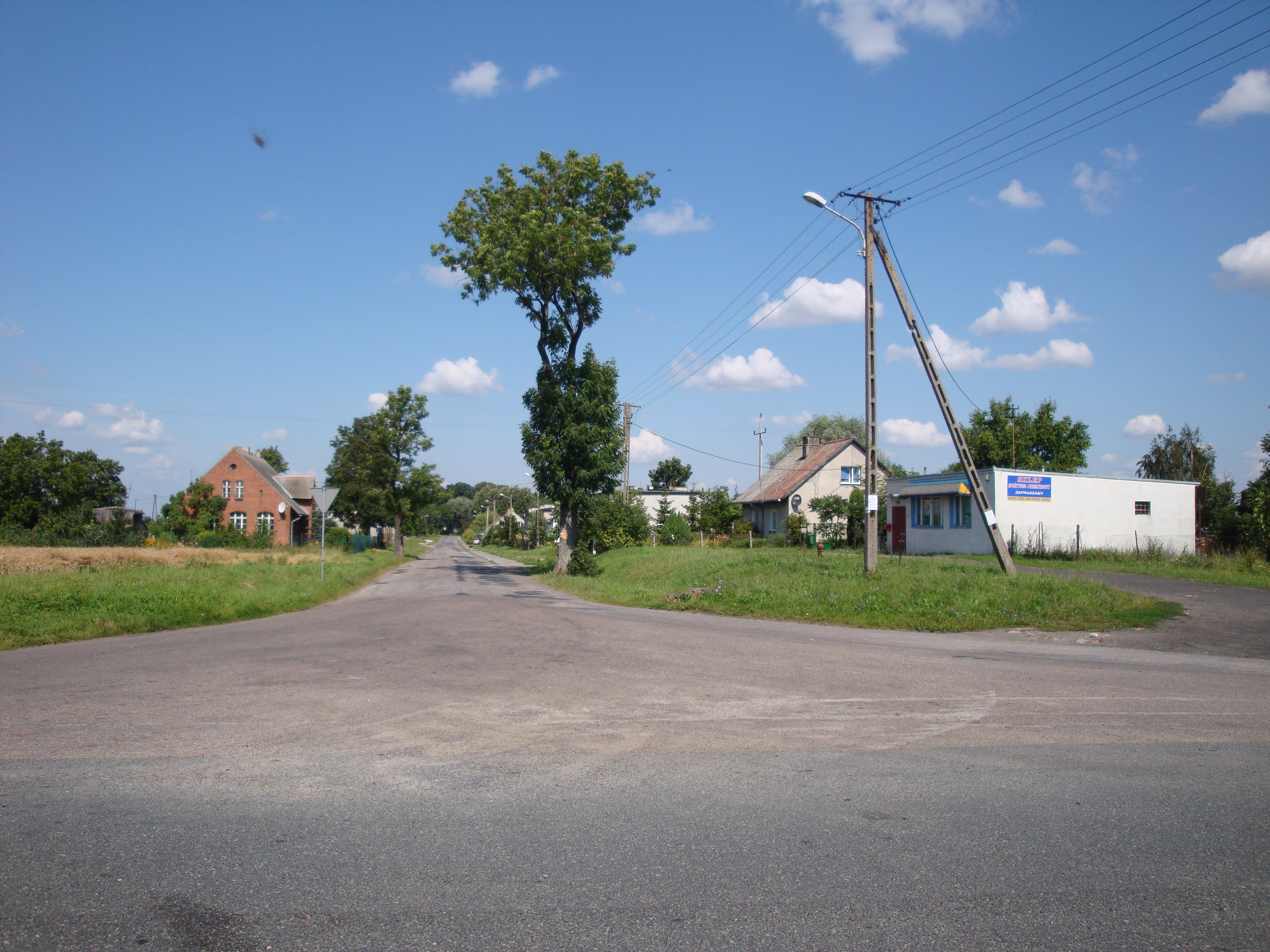

- Location within Poland
- Coordinates: 53°23′00″N 18°50′00″E
- Country: Poland
- Voivodeship: Kuyavian-Pomeranian
- County: Grudziądz
- Gmina: Radzyń Chełmiński
- Population (2011): 330

Dębieniec [dɛmˈbjɛɲɛt͡s] is a village in the administrative district of Gmina Radzyń Chełmiński, within Grudziądz County, Kuyavian-Pomeranian Voivodeship, in north-central Poland. In 2011, the total population of the village was 330.
