= Kneblowo =

- Village
- Location within Poland
- Coordinates: 53°23′41″N 18°54′04″E
- Country: Poland
- Voivodeship: Kuyavian-Pomeranian
- County: Grudziądz
- Gmina: Radzyń Chełmiński

Kneblowo [knɛˈblɔvɔ] is a village in the administrative district of Gmina Radzyń Chełmiński, within Grudziądz County, Kuyavian-Pomeranian Voivodeship, in north-central Poland.
