= Osieczek, Wąbrzeźno County =

Osieczek
- Village
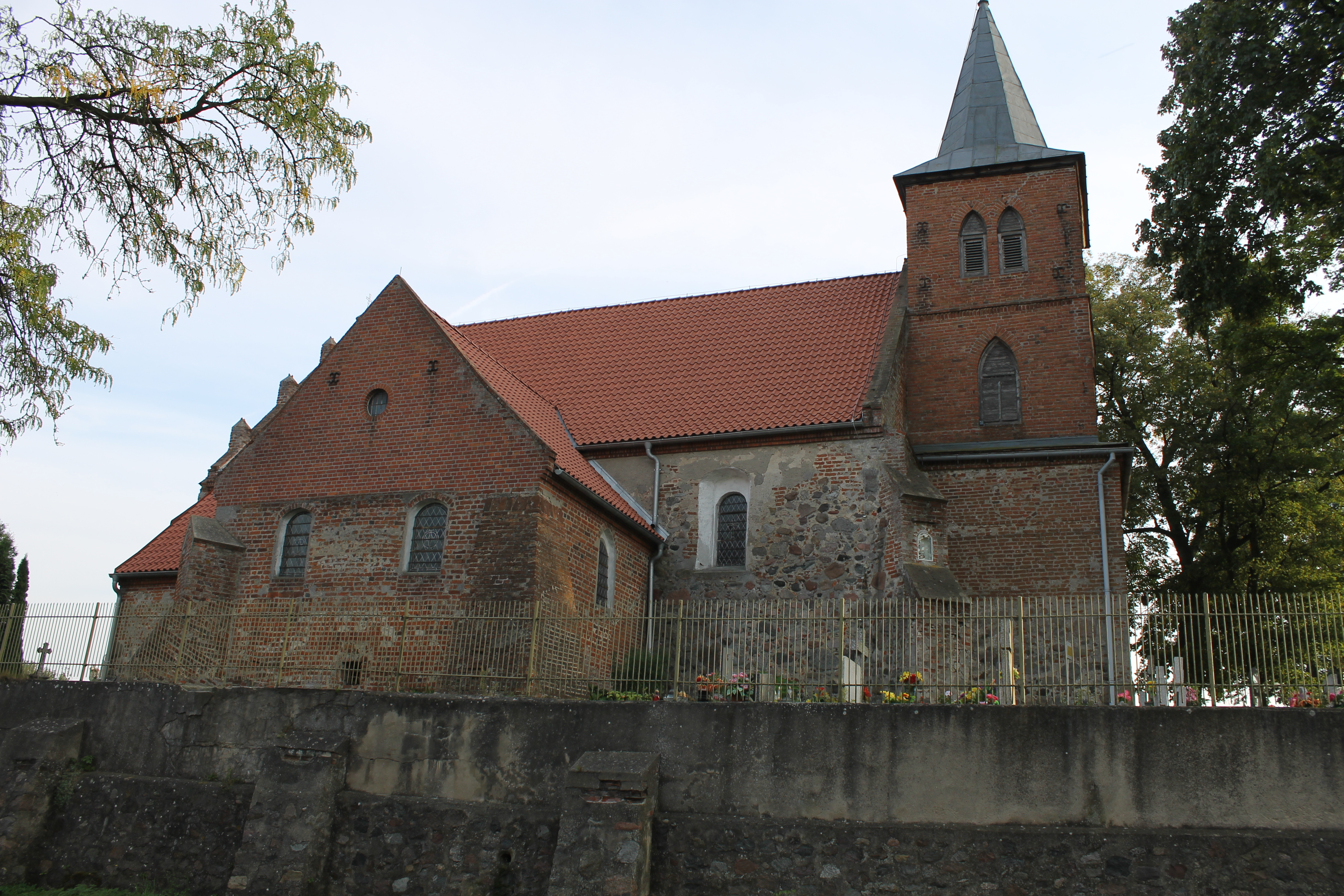
- Saint Catherine church in Osieczek

- Location within Poland
- Coordinates: 53°17′N 19°7′E
- Country: Poland
- Voivodeship: Kuyavian-Pomeranian
- County: Wąbrzeźno
- Gmina: Książki
- Time zone: UTC+1 (CET)
  - Summer (DST): UTC+2 (CEST)
- Vehicle registration: CWA

Osieczek [ɔˈɕɛt͡ʂɛk] is a village in the administrative district of Gmina Książki, within Wąbrzeźno County, Kuyavian-Pomeranian Voivodeship, in north-central Poland. It is located in the Chełmno Land in the historic region of Pomerania.

== History ==
The first information about Osieczek dates from 1222. However, the village existed much earlier, which is proved by the remains of the early medieval stronghold. It was located on the shore of Jezioro Wielkie, about 750 m north-east of the present day village centre. The medieval fortification was surrounded by 4–5 m high embankment, which was made of earth and wood, which remains are still visible today, and by moat, due to which the fortification was completely cut off from the land. That fortification existed probably from the 10th to the end of the 13th century. It was used by country dwellers as a shelter during the frequent raids of Prussian tribes. Osieczek belonged to Poland since establishment of the country under the Piast dynasty in the 10th century. The village became the property of Teutonic Knights in 1226 as a fief of Poland. As a result of the administrative changes, Osieczek became a part of the Brodnica commandery. The village was owned by Jeśke von ritter Mosseken (Jan from Osieczek) at the time. In 1450 it was passed into Jakob von Mossegh’s hands and in 1499 into Johanes Osyeczkowski’s hands. Descendants of the latter sold the village to voivode Jan Działyński. He owned 2621 włóka of land, 118 buildings, 72 houses, 3 inns, a watermill, a brewery and a distillery. He was also maintaining a church and added a tower and a chapel with vault to it. The latter was designed for the family tomb of the founders. The village was completely destroyed and depopulated during Swedish invasions of Poland. It faced also an outbreak of a cholera epidemic which decimated its population. The statues at the outskirts of the village, under which the dead sick were buried, are a preserved remnant of those events. After the second Swedish invasion, Olęders were brought to the village. Towards the end of the 17th century, the Działyński family gave Osieczek to Benedictine nuns from Grudziądz who moved into the village. The Działyński family bought Osieczek back from the order in 1770. The land was leased to Pokrzywnicki and Piwnicki.

The village was annexed by Prussia in the First Partition of Poland in 1772. In 1772, Osieczek became a part of the Nieżywięć parish and belonged to it until 1920. Prussian authorities built a school in 1840, which is now one of the cultural heritage sights of the village. The inhabitants of Osieczek were opposing Prussian authorities very strongly. The proof of it may be a peasant who as the first in partitioned Poland moved to a wagon in 1905 (before the famous Drzymała). Following World War I, Poland regained independence and control of the village.

During the German occupation of Poland (World War II), Osieczek was one of the sites of executions of Poles, carried out by the Germans in 1939 as part of the Intelligenzaktion.

== Monuments ==
- remains of the medieval stronghold
- parish church of Saint Catherine from 1222
- cottage owned by J. Lewandowski, 19th century
- cottage owned by A. Janke, 19th century
