= Brudzawki =

- Village
- Location within Poland
- Coordinates: 53°20′N 19°8′E
- Country: Poland
- Voivodeship: Kuyavian-Pomeranian
- County: Wąbrzeźno
- Gmina: Książki
- Time zone: UTC+1 (CET)
  - Summer (DST): UTC+2 (CEST)
- Vehicle registration: CWA

Brudzawki [bruˈd͡zafki] is a village in the administrative district of Gmina Książki, within Wąbrzeźno County, Kuyavian-Pomeranian Voivodeship, in north-central Poland.

== History ==
The village was most probably founded in the 13th century. According to the documents of the Teutonic Order, it was called Kl. Brusau, Klein Brudzaw, Browse, Bruschaw, Brusau. The name might come from „brnąć” – “to wade” – the settlement was located on the flooded areas through which inhabitants were wading. The land was cultivated only at higher elevation. In the 15th century the village was owned by Osieczkowski family. In 1561 Mateusz Osieczkowski sold it to Jan Działyński. Olędrzy colonised Brudzawki in 1720. Their task was to drain the land and then bring it under cultivation. The village was annexed by Prussia in the First Partition of Poland in 1772. In 1773 there were 17 homesteads and a school which survived to the present day. Brudzawki was separated on 20 August 1828. The commune covered 627 ha. After 1914 Poles bought farms from Germans. Following World War I, Poland regained independence and control of the village. Within interwar Poland, it was administratively located in the Pomeranian Voivodeship.

On 8 September 1939, during the German invasion of Poland at the start of World War II, an operation unit of the Sicherheitspolizei (German security police) shot 50 Poles in a place where sand was mined, located by the Książki–Brudzawki road (see: Nazi crimes against the Polish nation). To cover up the crime, Nazis exhumed the corpses by burning them on the spot in 1944. There is a monument and a plaque with the names of the people killed there.
