= Rozental =

- Village
- Location within Poland
- Coordinates: 53°22′56″N 18°54′54″E
- Country: Poland
- Voivodeship: Kuyavian-Pomeranian
- County: Grudziądz
- Gmina: Radzyń Chełmiński

Rozental [rɔˈzɛntal] is a village in the administrative district of Gmina Radzyń Chełmiński, within Grudziądz County, Kuyavian-Pomeranian Voivodeship, in north-central Poland.

== See also ==
- Sebastián Rozental (born 1976), Chilean professional soccer player
