= Gawłowice, Kuyavian-Pomeranian Voivodeship =

Gawłowice
- Village
- Location within Poland
- Coordinates: 53°21′33″N 18°52′45″E
- Country: Poland
- Voivodeship: Kuyavian-Pomeranian
- County: Grudziądz
- Gmina: Radzyń Chełmiński

Gawłowice [ɡavwɔˈvit͡sɛ] is a village in the administrative district of Gmina Radzyń Chełmiński, within Grudziądz County, Kuyavian-Pomeranian Voivodeship, in north-central Poland.
