= Zakrzewo, Grudziądz County =

Zakrzewo
- Village
- Location within Poland
- Coordinates: 53°25′08″N 18°56′23″E
- Country: Poland
- Voivodeship: Kuyavian-Pomeranian
- County: Grudziądz
- Gmina: Radzyń Chełmiński

Zakrzewo [zaˈkʂɛvɔ] is a village in the administrative district of Gmina Radzyń Chełmiński, within Grudziądz County, Kuyavian-Pomeranian Voivodeship, in north-central Poland.
