= Gołębiewo, Kuyavian-Pomeranian Voivodeship =

Gołębiewo
- Village
- Location within Poland
- Coordinates: 53°23′N 18°59′E
- Country: Poland
- Voivodeship: Kuyavian-Pomeranian
- County: Grudziądz
- Gmina: Radzyń Chełmiński
- Time zone: UTC+1 (CET)
  - Summer (DST): UTC+2 (CEST)
- Vehicle registration: CGR

Gołębiewo [ɡɔwɛmˈbjɛvɔ] is a village in the administrative district of Gmina Radzyń Chełmiński, within Grudziądz County, Kuyavian-Pomeranian Voivodeship, in north-central Poland. It is located in Chełmno Land within the historic region of Pomerania.

== History ==
During the German occupation of Poland (World War II), Gołębiewo was one of the sites of executions of Poles, carried out by the Germans in 1939 as part of the Intelligenzaktion.
