= Mazanki =

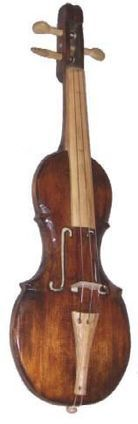

The Mazanki is a type of Slavic folk musical instrument that belongs to a group of idiophones or string instruments. They were particularly popular in regions of Poland Greater Poland and in Lubusz Land and usually used along with bagpipes and/or timpani. By the 20th century it was replaced by the violin.

== Construction ==
The Mazanki is similar in shape to the violin, with the difference that it is smaller and has 3 or 5 strings that are tuned in fourths. The body and the neck are made of one piece of wood, and the soundboard is slightly raised. The bridge is the most characteristic element of the instrument as one of its feet is longer than the other and going through the E-whole in the top it touches the bottom of the instrument and in this way replaces the sound post.

== Technique for playing ==
The sound producing technique is also a little different from the modern violin technique. the performer, instead of using a regular bow, moves the strings with a tight rubber band tied to the ends of a wooden stick. To make the rubber band less slippery folk musicians will sometimes rub it with regular rosin or with a substance made of white flour mixed with honey and chopped walnuts.
