= Mazanki, Kuyavian-Pomeranian Voivodeship =

Mazanki
- Village
- Location within Poland
- Coordinates: 53°22′N 18°58′E
- Country: Poland
- Voivodeship: Kuyavian-Pomeranian
- County: Grudziądz
- Gmina: Radzyń Chełmiński

Mazanki [maˈzaŋki] is a village in the administrative district of Gmina Radzyń Chełmiński, within Grudziądz County, Kuyavian-Pomeranian Voivodeship, in north-central Poland.
