= Radzyń Chełmiński =

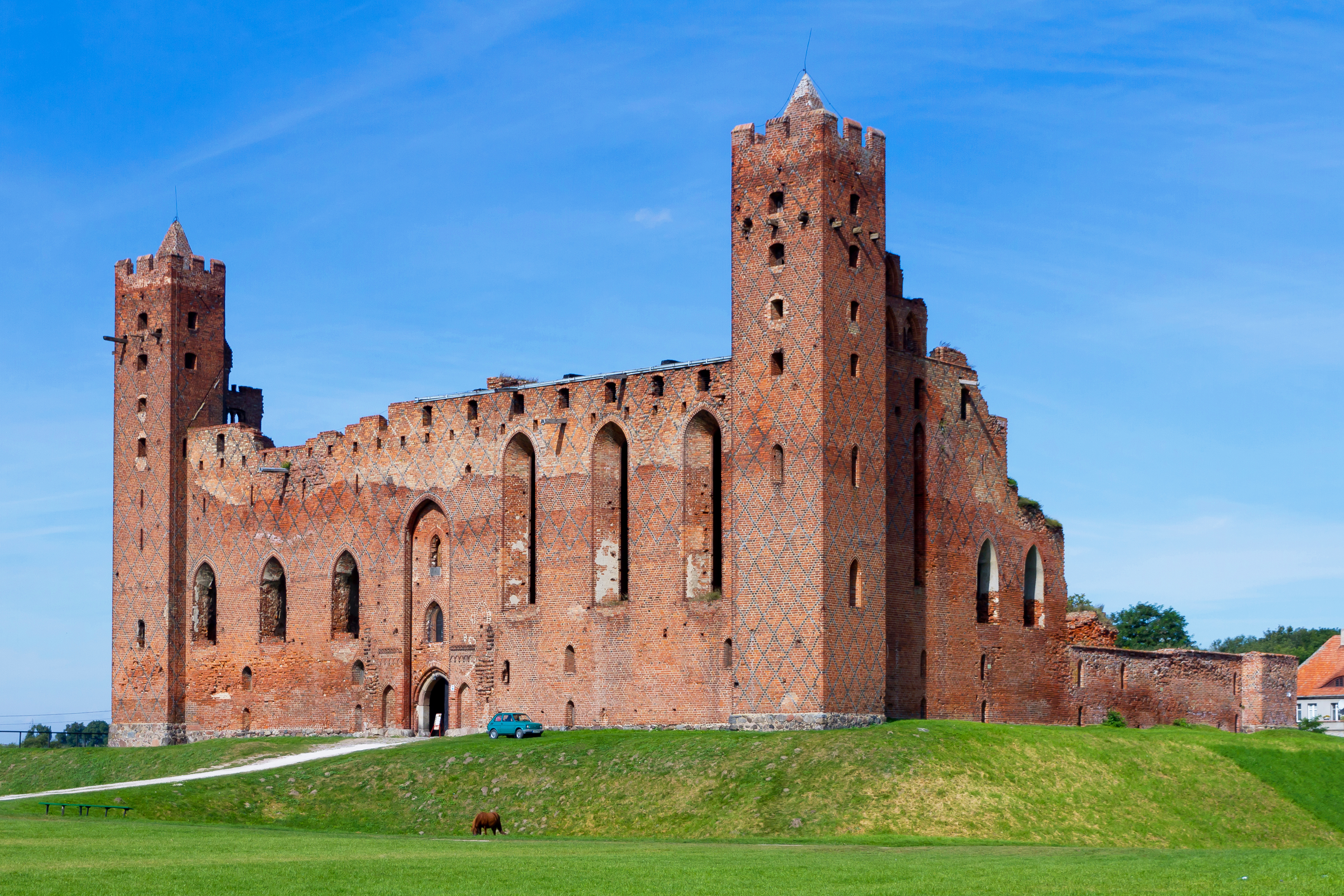
- Radzyń Chełmiński Castle Ruins

- Coat of arms

- Location within Poland
- Coordinates: 53°23′8″N 18°56′11″E
- Country: Poland
- Voivodeship: Kuyavian-Pomeranian
- County: Grudziądz
- Gmina: Radzyń Chełmiński

Area
  - Total: 1.78 km^{2} (0.69 sq mi)

Population (2025)
  - Total: 1,763
  - Density: 990/km^{2} (2,570/sq mi)
- Time zone: UTC+1 (CET)
  - Summer (DST): UTC+2 (CEST)
- Postal code: 87-220
- Vehicle registration: CGR
- Website: http://www.radzynchelminski.pl

Radzyń Chełmiński (Polish pronunciation: [ˈrad͡zɨɲ xɛu̯ˈmʲiɲskʲi]; German: Rehden [ˈʁeːdn̩]) is a town in Grudziądz County, Kuyavian-Pomeranian Voivodeship, Poland, with 1,763 inhabitants (2025).

== History ==
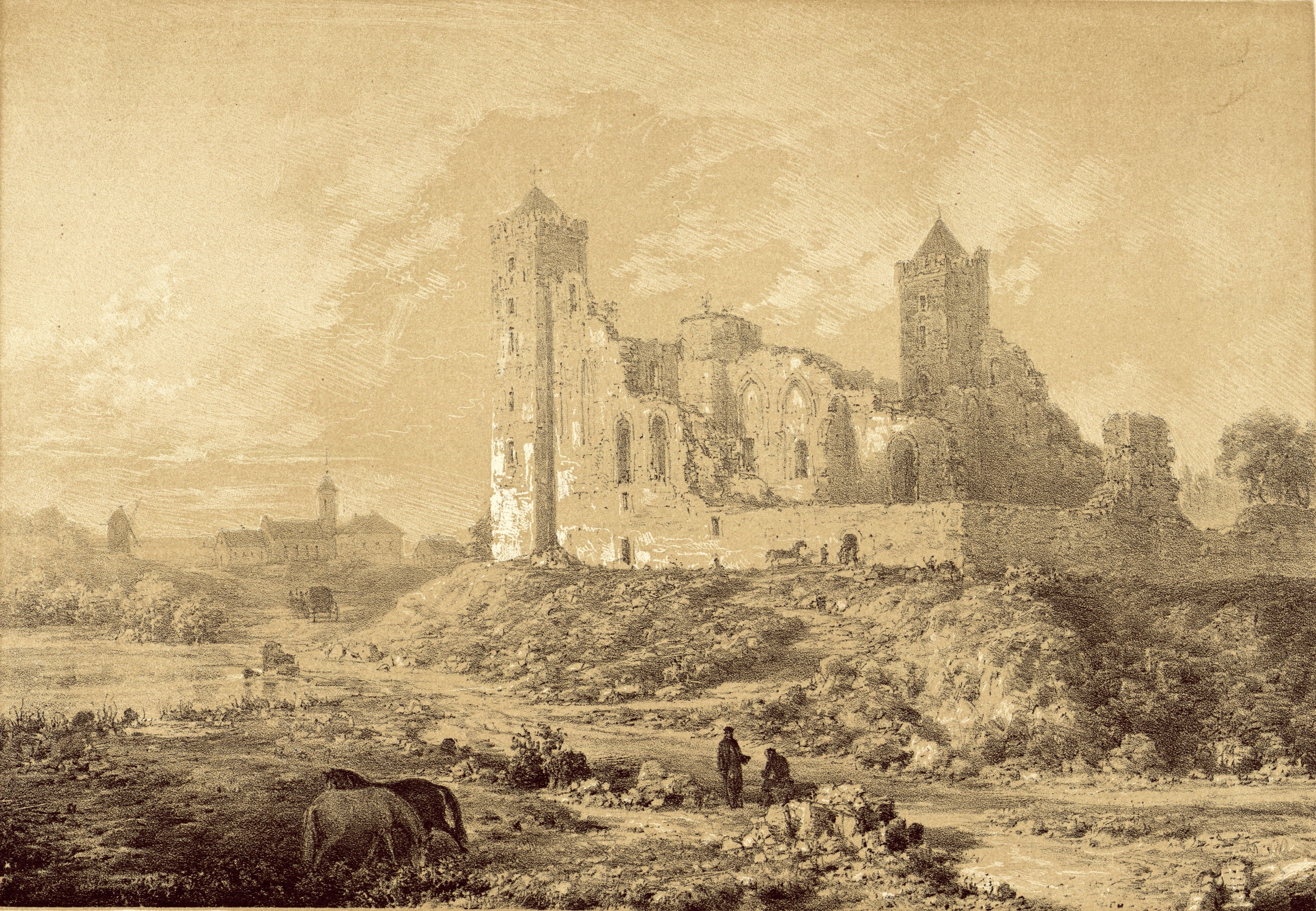
19th-century view of the castle ruins

Radzyń is located within the historic Chełmno Land, which became part of the emerging Polish state in the 10th century. Radzyń was a royal town of the Kingdom of Poland, administratively located in the Chełmno Voivodeship. It was annexed by Prussia in the First Partition of Poland in 1772. In October and November 1831, various Polish cavalry and infantry units and intendant troops of the November Uprising stopped near the town on the way to their internment places. The town was restored to Poland after the nation regained independence in the aftermath of World War I in 1918.

During the German occupation of Poland (World War II), in autumn of 1939, the Germans carried out mass arrests of local Poles as part of the Intelligenzaktion. Arrested Poles were imprisoned in nearby Rywałd and then massacred in the forests of nearby Stara Ruda.

== Points of interest ==
The town contains the ruins of Radzyń Chełmiński Castle, first built in 1234 by the Teutonic Knights.

Other Gothic sights include the parish church of St. Anne, which construction started about 1310 and finished about 1340, and the chapel of St. George. A memorial dedicated to local Poles-victims of World War II and Nazi Germany-is located at the market square.

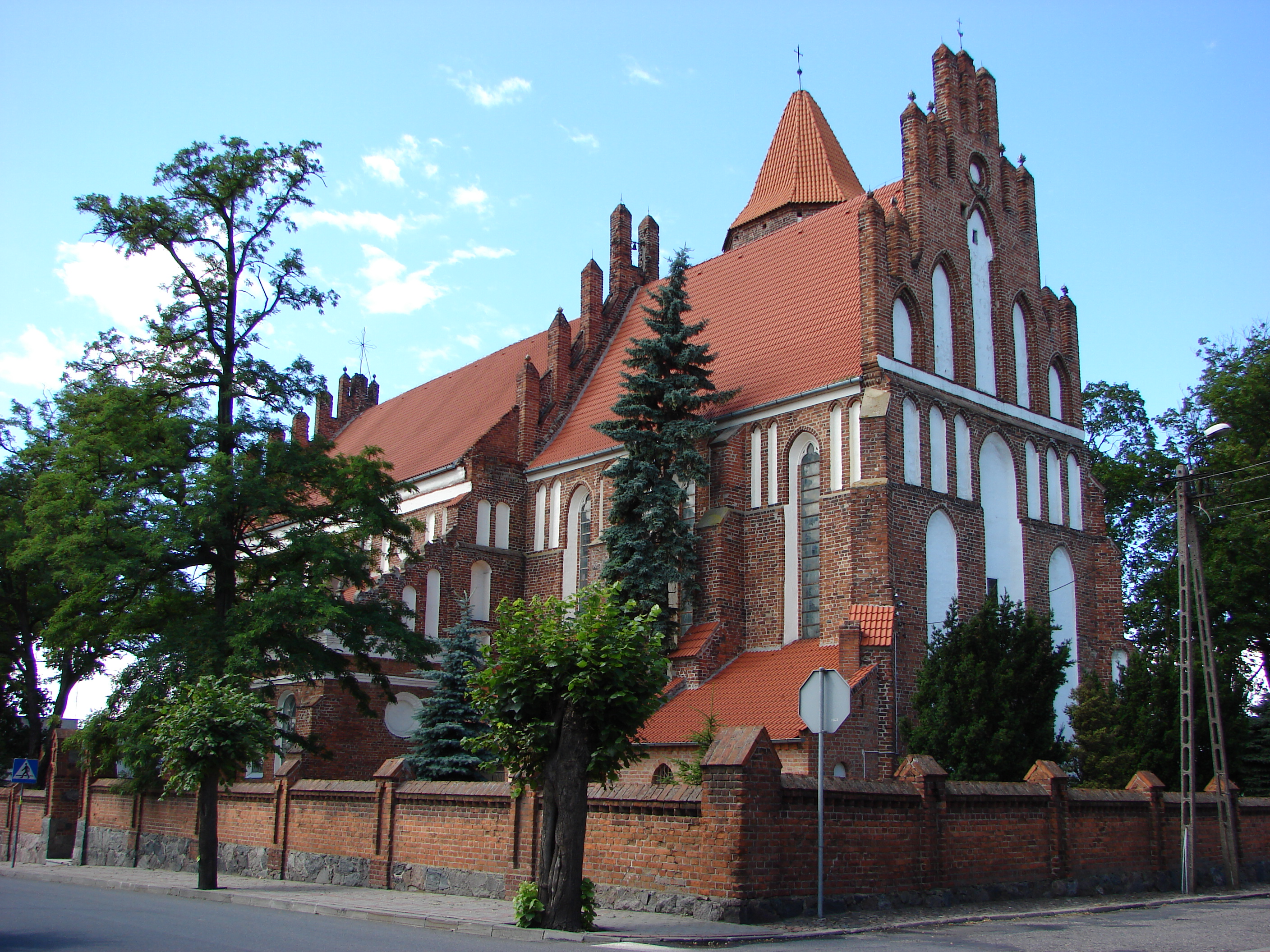
Saint Anne church

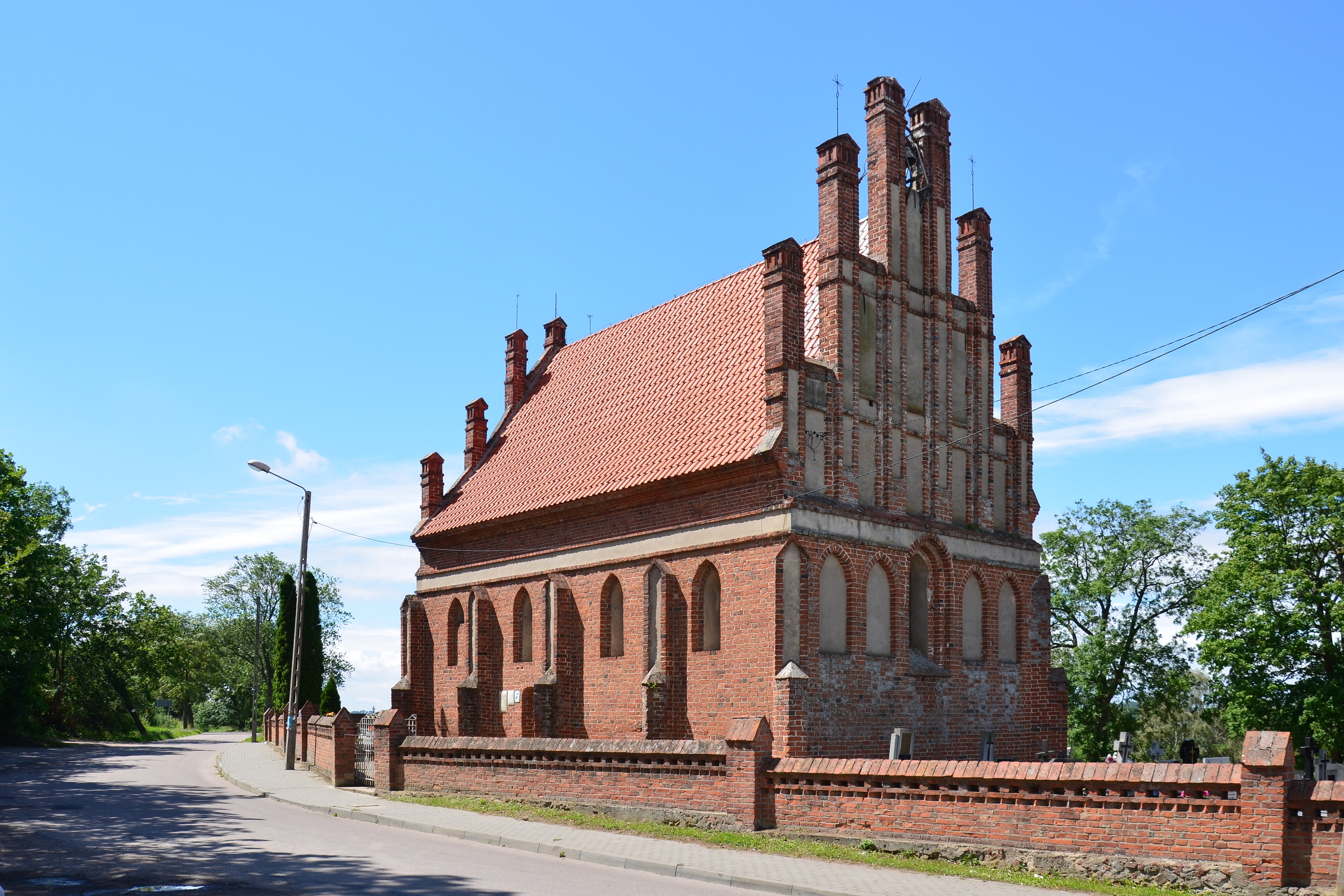
Saint George chapel

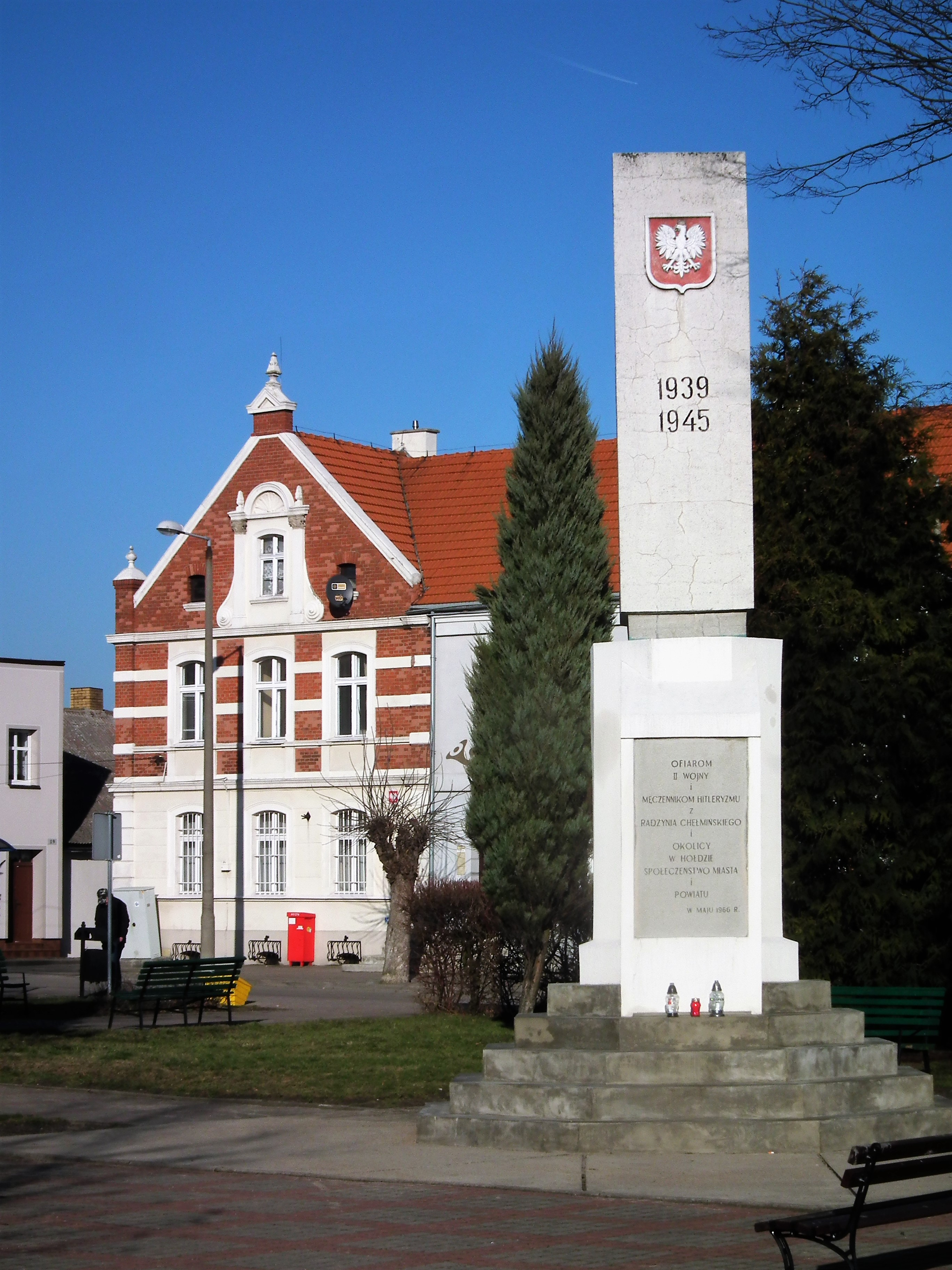
Memorial to the local victims of World War II and Nazi Germany

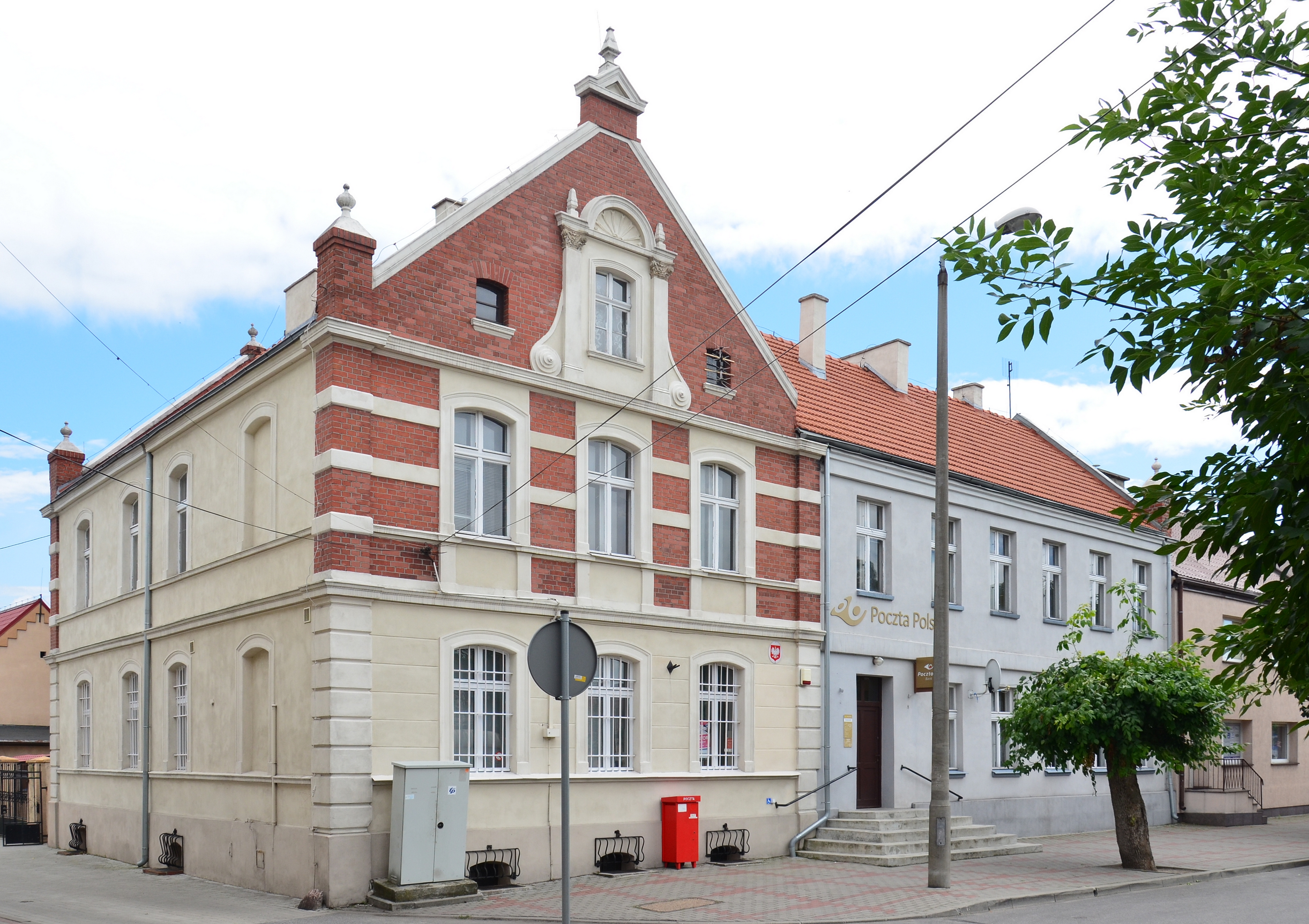
Polish Post office

== Sports ==
The local football team is Radzynianka Radzyń Chełmiński. It competes in the lower leagues.
