= Rywałd, Kuyavian-Pomeranian Voivodeship =

Rywałd
- Village
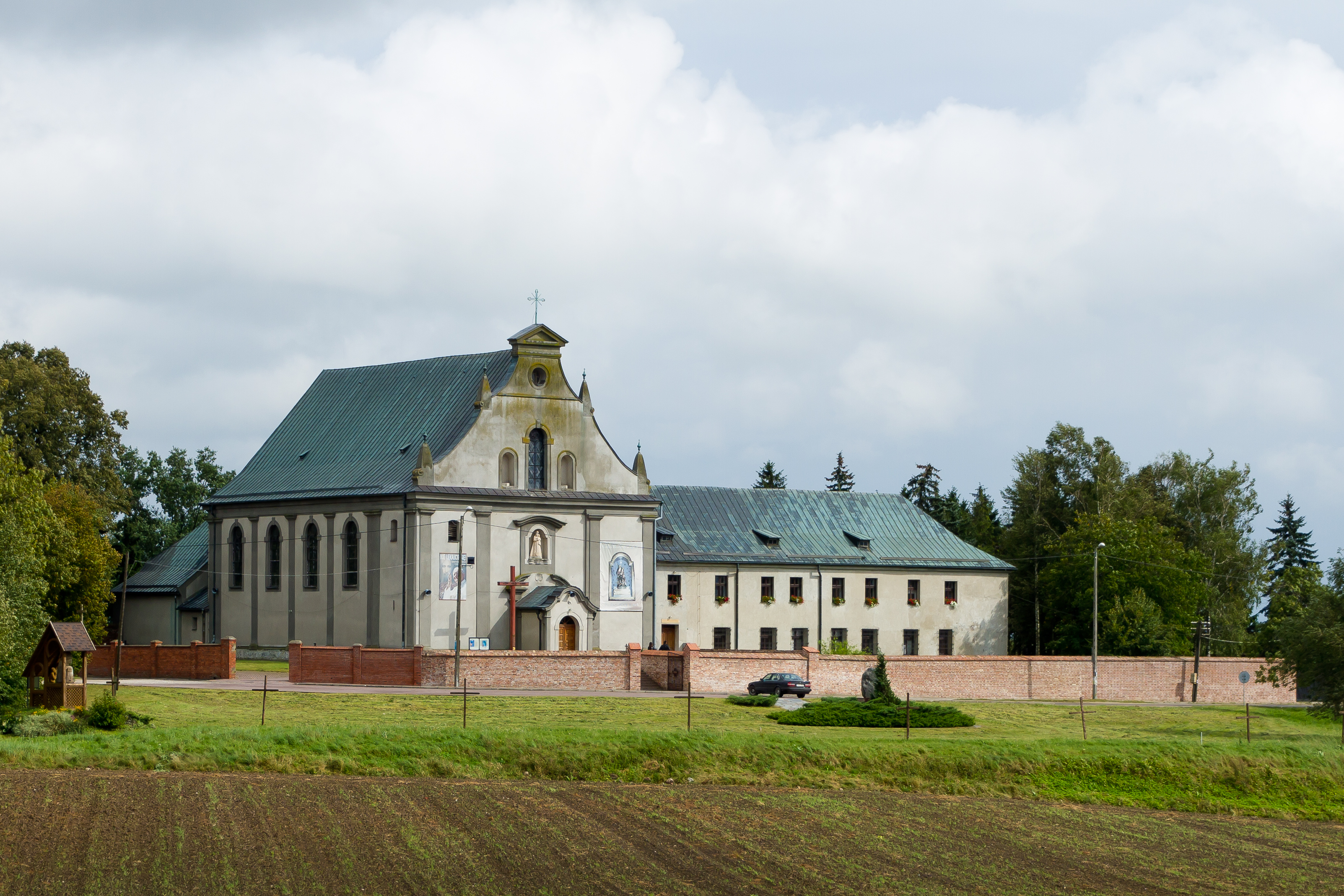
- Baroque Church and monastery of the Capuchins from the 18th century
- Interactive map of Rywałd
- Location within Poland
- Coordinates: 53°22′51″N 19°1′55″E
- Country: Poland
- Voivodeship: Kuyavian-Pomeranian
- County: Grudziądz
- Gmina: Radzyń Chełmiński
- Population: 420
- Time zone: UTC+1 (CET)
  - Summer (DST): UTC+2 (CEST)

Rywałd [ˈrɨvau̯t] is a village in the administrative district of Gmina Radzyń Chełmiński, within Grudziądz County, Kuyavian-Pomeranian Voivodeship, in north-central Poland.

During the German occupation of Poland (World War II), several Poles from Rywałd, Radzyń Chełmiński and other nearby settlements were imprisoned in the local monastery, before being massacred in the nearby village of Stara Ruda.
