= Stara Ruda, Kuyavian-Pomeranian Voivodeship =

Stara Ruda
- Village
- Location within Poland
- Coordinates: 53°23′43″N 19°01′27″E
- Country: Poland
- Voivodeship: Kuyavian-Pomeranian
- County: Grudziądz
- Gmina: Radzyń Chełmiński
- Time zone: UTC+1 (CET)
  - Summer (DST): UTC+2 (CEST)
- Vehicle registration: CGR

Stara Ruda [ˈstara ˈruda] is a village in the administrative district of Gmina Radzyń Chełmiński, within Grudziądz County, Kuyavian-Pomeranian Voivodeship, in north-central Poland.

During the German occupation of Poland (World War II), in 1939, the Germans carried out a massacre of several Poles from Stara Ruda, Radzyń Chełmiński and other nearby settlements in the forest of Stara Ruda, as part of the Intelligenzaktion.
