= ILY =

Ily or ILY may refer to:

- ILY sign, an informal sign in American Sign Language for "I love you"
- Iły, Kuyavian-Pomeranian Voivodeship, Poland
- Iły, Masovian Voivodeship, Poland
- Islay Airport, Scotland (IATA code)
- "Ily (I Love You Baby)", a 2019 song by Surf Mesa
- "ILY (Yokubō)", a 1999 song by Olivia

== See also ==
- I Love You (disambiguation)
- Illy (disambiguation)
