= Koziary, Kuyavian-Pomeranian Voivodeship =

Koziary
- Village
- Location within Poland
- Coordinates: 53°16′N 19°31′E
- Country: Poland
- Voivodeship: Kuyavian-Pomeranian
- County: Brodnica
- Gmina: Bartniczka
- Population: 58

Koziary [kɔˈʑarɨ] is a village in the administrative district of Gmina Bartniczka, within Brodnica County, Kuyavian-Pomeranian Voivodeship, in north-central Poland.
