= Fiałki =

- Village
- Location within Poland
- Coordinates: 53°12′N 19°40′E
- Country: Poland
- Voivodeship: Kuyavian-Pomeranian
- County: Brodnica
- Gmina: Górzno
- Population: 190

Fiałki [ˈfjau̯ki] is a village in the administrative district of Gmina Górzno, within Brodnica County, Kuyavian-Pomeranian Voivodeship, in north-central Poland.
