= Grążawy =

- Village
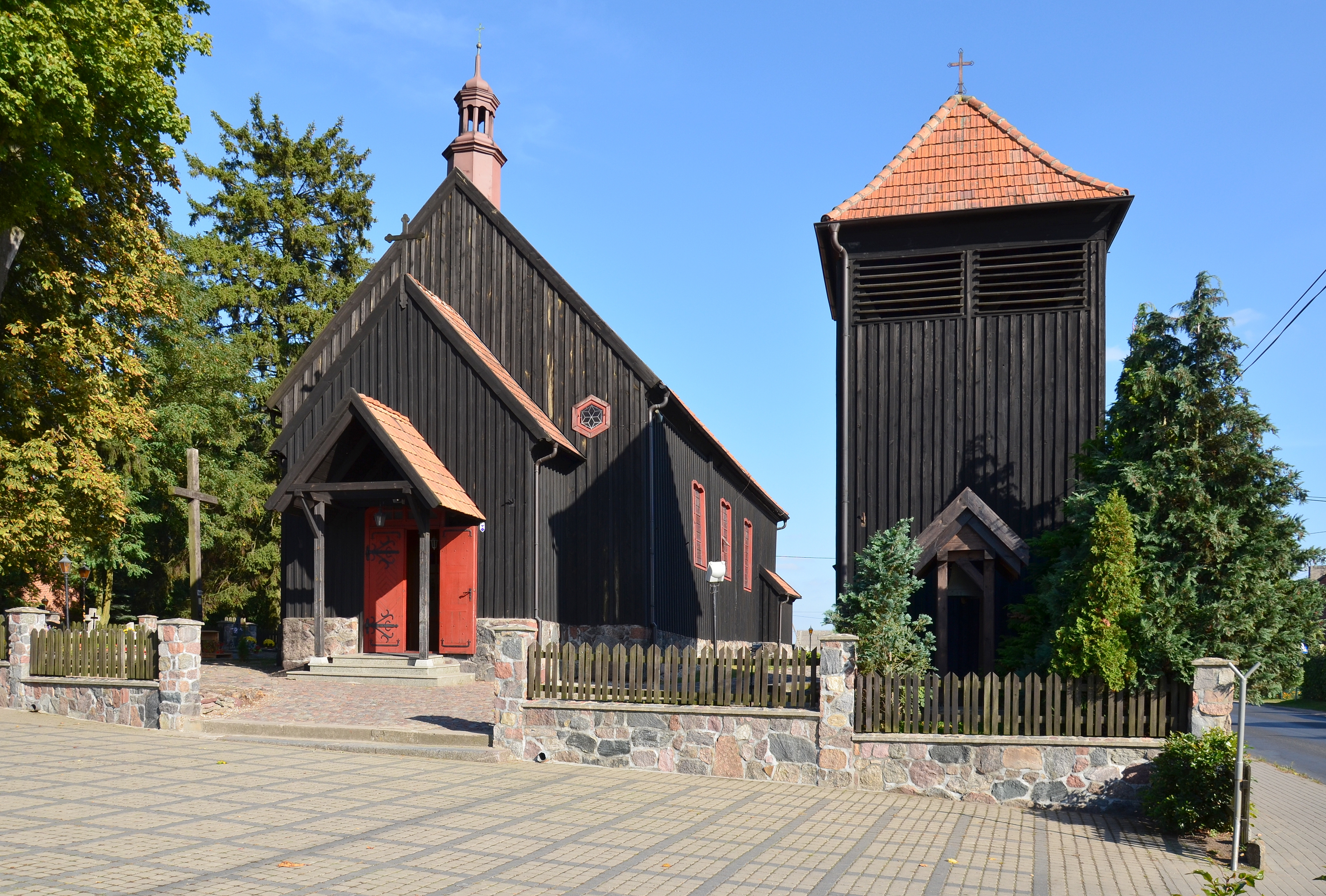
- St. Martin's Church in Grążawy

- Location within Poland
- Coordinates: 53°15′N 19°35′E
- Country: Poland
- Voivodeship: Kuyavian-Pomeranian
- County: Brodnica
- Gmina: Bartniczka

Population
  - Total: 522
- Time zone: UTC+1 (CET)
  - Summer (DST): UTC+2 (CEST)
- Vehicle registration: CBR

Grążawy [ɡrɔ̃ˈʐavɨ] is a village in the administrative district of Gmina Bartniczka, within Brodnica County, Kuyavian-Pomeranian Voivodeship, in north-central Poland.

In the 12th century, a Polish stronghold and castellany was established in Grążawy.
