= Najmowo =

- Village
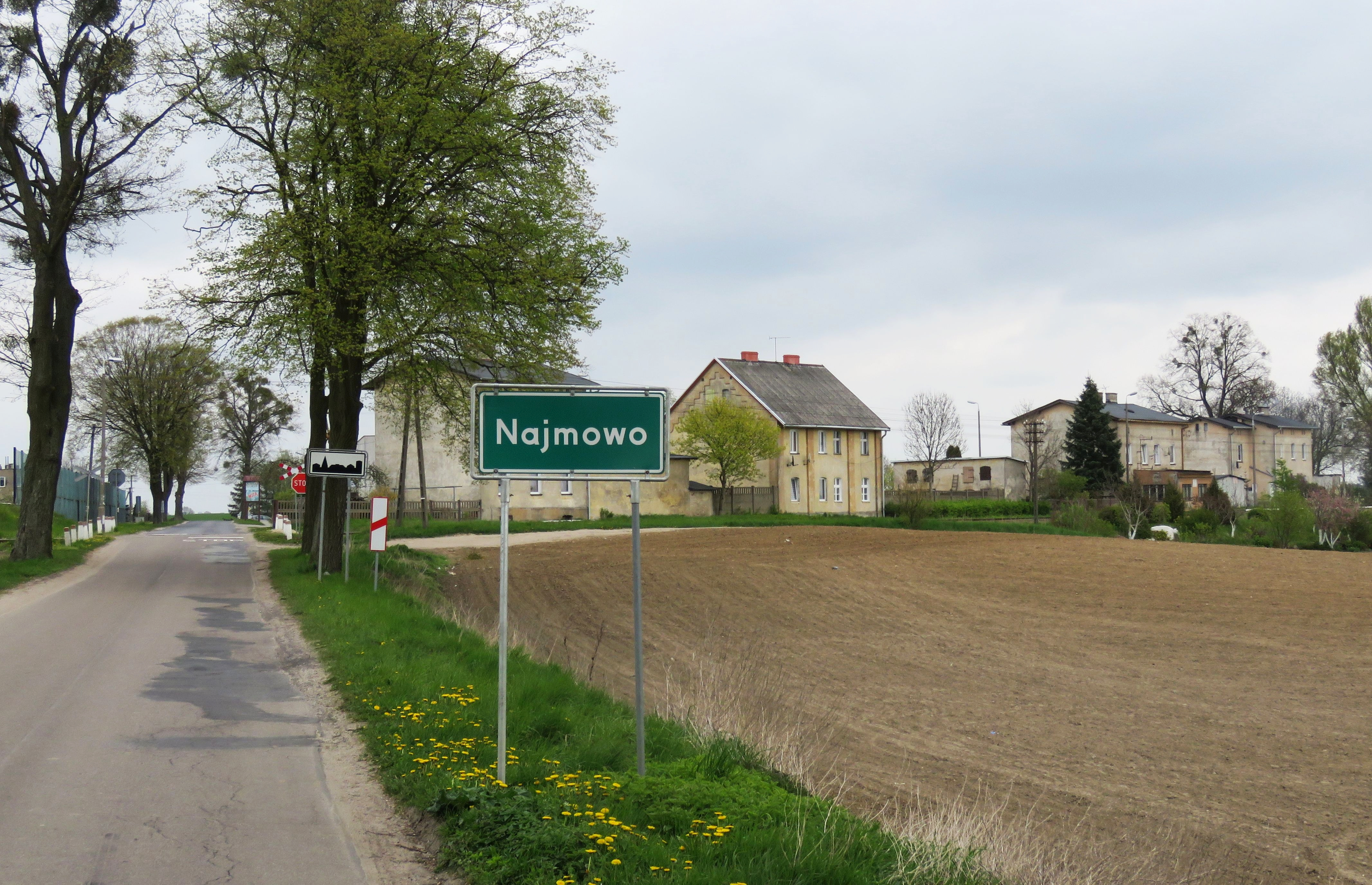

- Location within Poland
- Coordinates: 53°19′N 19°20′E
- Country: Poland
- Voivodeship: Kuyavian-Pomeranian
- County: Brodnica
- Gmina: Zbiczno
- Population: 450
- Time zone: UTC+1 (CET)
  - Summer (DST): UTC+2 (CEST)
- Vehicle registration: CBR

Najmowo [najˈmɔvɔ] is a village in the administrative district of Gmina Zbiczno, within Brodnica County, Kuyavian-Pomeranian Voivodeship, in north-central Poland.

== History ==
During the German occupation of Poland (World War II), Najmowo was one of the sites of executions of Poles, carried out by the Germans in 1939 as part of the Intelligenzaktion.
