= Gołkowo, Kuyavian-Pomeranian Voivodeship =

Gołkowo
- Village
- Location within Poland
- Coordinates: 53°11′26″N 19°33′55″E
- Country: Poland
- Voivodeship: Kuyavian-Pomeranian
- County: Brodnica
- Gmina: Górzno
- Population: 380

Gołkowo [ɡɔu̯ˈkɔvɔ] is a village in the administrative district of Gmina Górzno, within Brodnica County, Kuyavian-Pomeranian Voivodeship, in north-central Poland.
