= Długi Most =

- Village
- Location within Poland
- Coordinates: 53°15′58″N 19°35′27″E
- Country: Poland
- Voivodeship: Kuyavian-Pomeranian
- County: Brodnica
- Gmina: Bartniczka

Długi Most [ˈdwuɡi ˈmɔst] is a village in the administrative district of Gmina Bartniczka, within Brodnica County, Kuyavian-Pomeranian Voivodeship, in north-central Poland.
