= Koń, Kuyavian-Pomeranian Voivodeship =

Koń
- Village
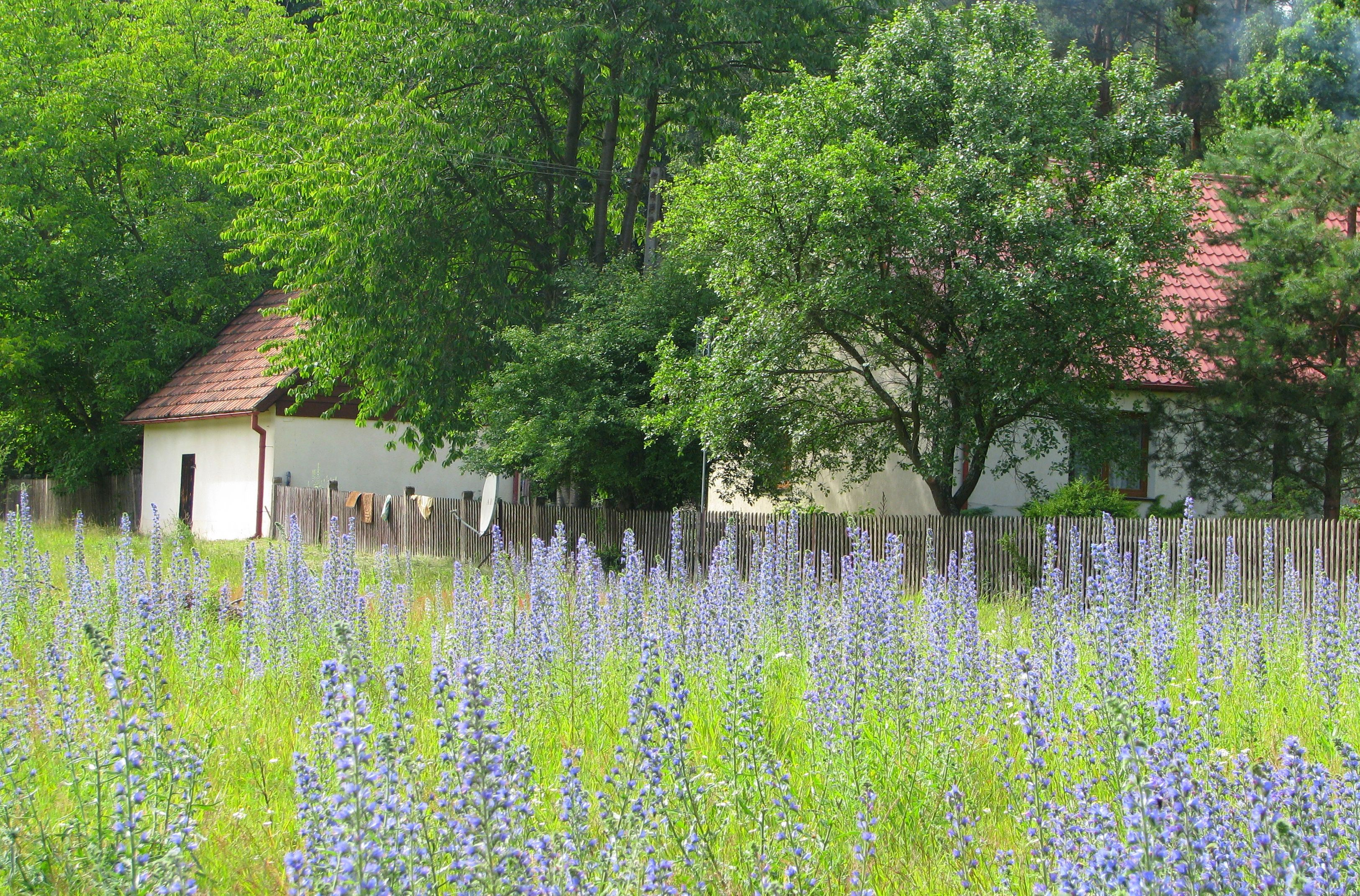

- Location within Poland
- Coordinates: 53°22′10″N 19°20′50″E
- Country: Poland
- Voivodeship: Kuyavian-Pomeranian
- County: Brodnica
- Gmina: Zbiczno
- Population: 30

Koń [kɔɲ] is a village in the administrative district of Gmina Zbiczno, within Brodnica County, Kuyavian-Pomeranian Voivodeship, in north-central Poland.
