= Ładnówko =

- Village
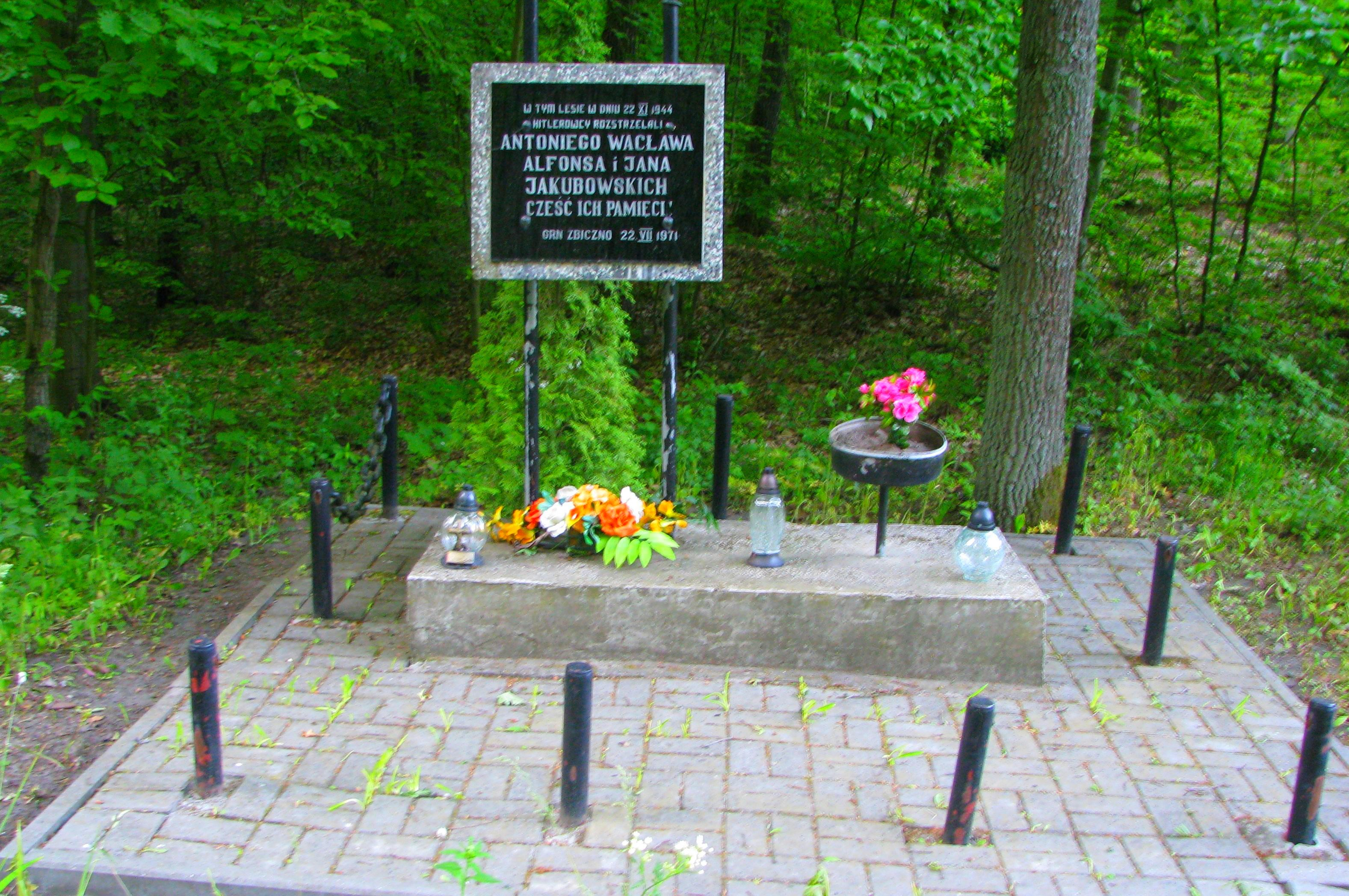

- Location within Poland
- Coordinates: 53°23′54″N 19°21′25″E
- Country: Poland
- Voivodeship: Kuyavian-Pomeranian
- County: Brodnica
- Gmina: Zbiczno
- Population: 100

Ładnówko [wadˈnufkɔ] is a village in the administrative district of Gmina Zbiczno, within Brodnica County, Kuyavian-Pomeranian Voivodeship, in north-central Poland.
