= Samin, Kuyavian-Pomeranian Voivodeship =

Samin
- Village
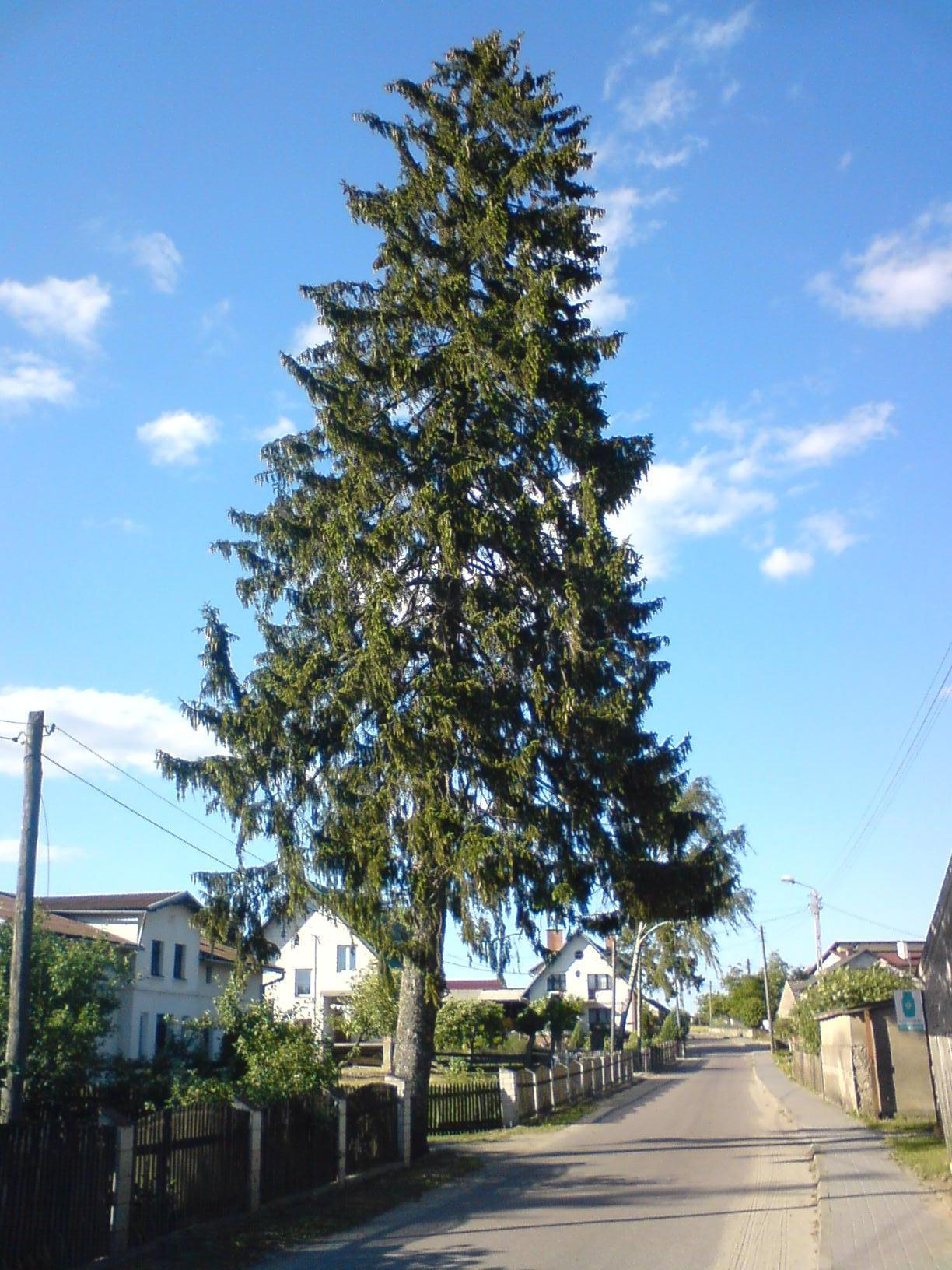
- Spruce in the center of Samin, Kuyavian-Pomeranian Voivodeship

- Location within Poland
- Coordinates: 53°16′16″N 19°38′44″E
- Country: Poland
- Voivodeship: Kuyavian-Pomeranian
- County: Brodnica
- Gmina: Bartniczka
- Population: 111

Samin [ˈsamin] is a village in the administrative district of Gmina Bartniczka, within Brodnica County, Kuyavian-Pomeranian Voivodeship, in north-central Poland.
