= Sumowo =

Sumowo may refer to the following places:

- Sumowo, Kuyavian-Pomeranian Voivodeship (north-central Poland)
- Sumowo, Sejny County in Podlaskie Voivodeship (north-east Poland)
- Sumowo, Suwałki County in Podlaskie Voivodeship (north-east Poland)
- Sumowo, Warmian-Masurian Voivodeship (north Poland)
