= Zastawie, Kuyavian-Pomeranian Voivodeship =

Zastawie
- Village
- Location within Poland
- Coordinates: 53°21′N 19°30′E
- Country: Poland
- Voivodeship: Kuyavian-Pomeranian
- County: Brodnica
- Gmina: Zbiczno
- Population: 170

Zastawie [zasˈtavjɛ] is a village in the administrative district of Gmina Zbiczno, within Brodnica County, Kuyavian-Pomeranian Voivodeship, in north-central Poland.
