= Nowe Świerczyny =

- Village
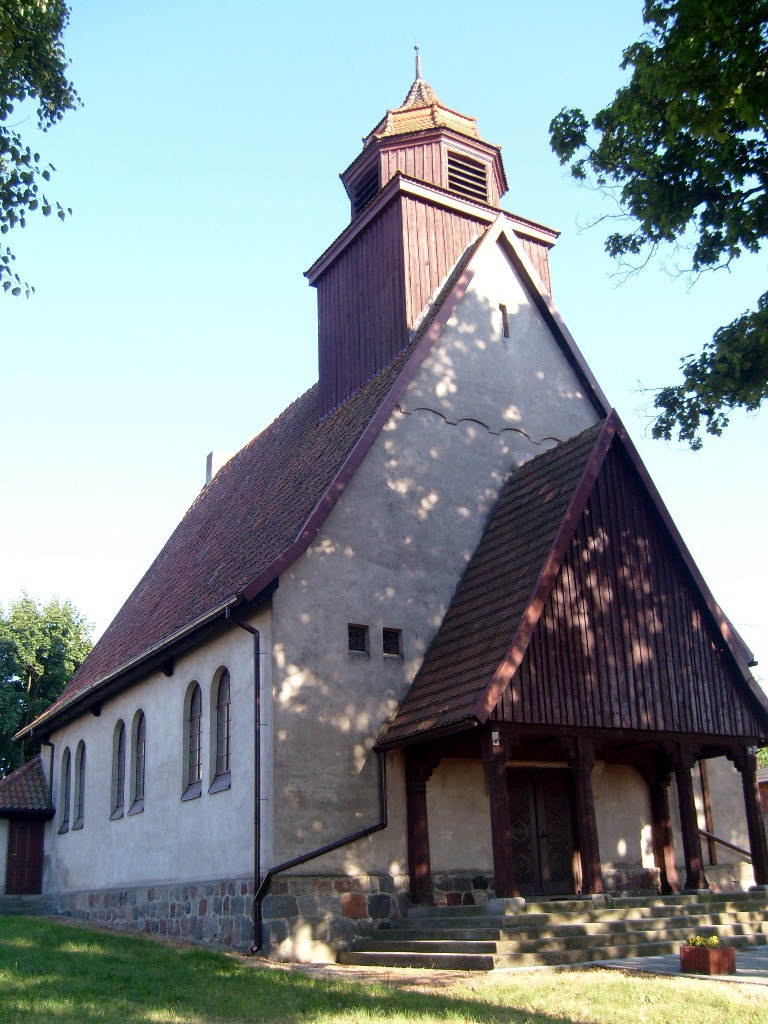
- Church in Nowe Swierczyny

- Location within Poland
- Coordinates: 53°13′51″N 19°29′09″E
- Country: Poland
- Voivodeship: Kuyavian-Pomeranian
- County: Brodnica
- Gmina: Bartniczka
- Population: 291

Nowe Świerczyny (Polish: [ˈnɔvɛ ɕfjɛrˈt͡ʂɨnɨ]) is a village in the administrative district of Gmina Bartniczka, within Brodnica County, Kuyavian-Pomeranian Voivodeship, in north-central Poland.
