= Gortatowo, Kuyavian-Pomeranian Voivodeship =

Gortatowo
- Village
- Location within Poland
- Coordinates: 53°11′N 19°29′E
- Country: Poland
- Voivodeship: Kuyavian-Pomeranian
- County: Brodnica
- Gmina: Gmina Brodnica
- Population: 210

Gortatowo [ɡɔrtaˈtɔvɔ] is a village in the administrative district of Gmina Brodnica, within Brodnica County, Kuyavian-Pomeranian Voivodeship, in north-central Poland.
