= Nowa Igliczyzna =

- Village
- Location within Poland
- Coordinates: 53°12′2″N 19°28′34″E
- Country: Poland
- Voivodeship: Kuyavian-Pomeranian
- County: Brodnica
- Gmina: Bartniczka
- Population: 29

Nowa Igliczyzna [ˈnɔva iɡliˈt͡ʂɨzna] is a village in the administrative district of Gmina Bartniczka, within Brodnica County, Kuyavian-Pomeranian Voivodeship, in north-central Poland.
