= Tęgowiec =

- Village
- Location within Poland
- Coordinates: 53°21′24″N 19°27′21″E
- Country: Poland
- Voivodeship: Kuyavian-Pomeranian
- County: Brodnica
- Gmina: Zbiczno

Tęgowiec [tɛŋˈɡɔvjɛt͡s] is a village in the administrative district of Gmina Zbiczno, within Brodnica County, Kuyavian-Pomeranian Voivodeship, in north-central Poland.
