= Gołkówko =

- Village
- Location within Poland
- Coordinates: 54°12′53″N 19°32′34″E
- Country: Poland
- Voivodeship: Kuyavian-Pomeranian
- County: Brodnica
- Gmina: Bartniczka

Population
  - Total: 56
- Registration plates: CBR

Gołkówko [ɡɔu̯ˈkufkɔ] is a village in the administrative district of Gmina Bartniczka, within Brodnica County, Kuyavian-Pomeranian Voivodeship, in north-central Poland.

From 1975 – 1998 it belonged to the administrative area of Toruń Voivodeship.

The first known mention of Gołkówko is from 1293, when it was then a property of the bishops of Płock.

Historical population
Year	Pop.	±%
1885	105	—
1910	70	−33.3%
1921	73	+4.3%
