= Skrobacja =

- Village
- Location within Poland
- Coordinates: 53°10′51″N 19°32′31″E
- Country: Poland
- Voivodeship: Kuyavian-Pomeranian
- County: Brodnica
- Gmina: Bartniczka

Skrobacja [skrɔˈbat͡sja] is a village in the administrative district of Gmina Bartniczka, within Brodnica County, Kuyavian-Pomeranian Voivodeship, in north-central Poland.
