= Stare Świerczyny =

- Village
- Location within Poland
- Coordinates: 53°14′29″N 19°29′06″E
- Country: Poland
- Voivodeship: Kuyavian-Pomeranian
- County: Brodnica
- Gmina: Bartniczka
- Population: 248

Stare Świerczyny (Polish: [ˈstarɛ ɕfjɛrˈt͡ʂɨnɨ]) is a village in the administrative district of Gmina Bartniczka, within Brodnica County, Kuyavian-Pomeranian Voivodeship, in north-central Poland.
