= Zaborowo, Brodnica County =

Zaborowo
- Village
- Location within Poland
- Coordinates: 53°13′N 19°37′E
- Country: Poland
- Voivodeship: Kuyavian-Pomeranian
- County: Brodnica
- Gmina: Górzno

Zaborowo ([zabɔˈrɔvɔ]; German: Zaborowo, 1942–45 Waldzabern) is a village in the administrative district of Gmina Górzno, within Brodnica County, Kuyavian-Pomeranian Voivodeship, in north-central Poland.
