= Jastrzębie, Brodnica County =

Jastrzębie
- Village
- Location within Poland
- Coordinates: 53°13′N 19°31′E
- Country: Poland
- Voivodeship: Kuyavian-Pomeranian
- County: Brodnica
- Gmina: Bartniczka
- Population: 640

Jastrzębie [jasˈtʂɛmbjɛ] is a village in the administrative district of Gmina Bartniczka, within Brodnica County, Kuyavian-Pomeranian Voivodeship, in north-central Poland.
