= Kruszynki =

- Village
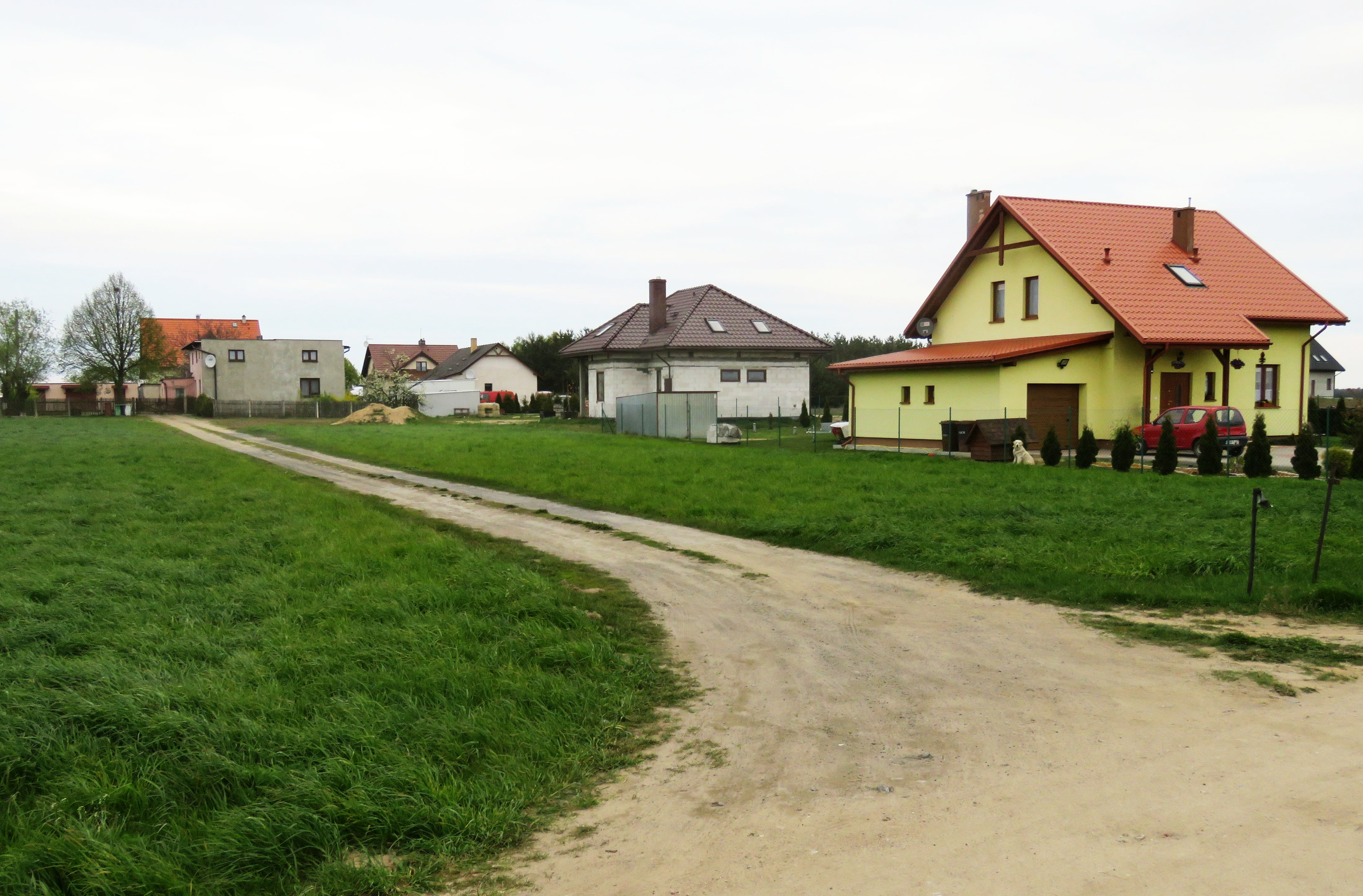
- Houses by the roadside in Kruszynki

- Location within Poland
- Coordinates: 53°16′35″N 19°21′42″E
- Country: Poland
- Voivodeship: Kuyavian-Pomeranian
- County: Brodnica
- Gmina: Gmina Brodnica

Kruszynki [kruˈʂɨnki] is a village in the administrative district of Gmina Brodnica, within Brodnica County, Kuyavian-Pomeranian Voivodeship, in north-central Poland.
