= Pokrzydowo =

- Village
- Location within Poland
- Coordinates: 53°20′N 19°29′E
- Country: Poland
- Voivodeship: Kuyavian-Pomeranian
- County: Brodnica
- Gmina: Zbiczno
- Population: 950

Pokrzydowo [pɔkʂɨˈdɔvɔ] is a village in the administrative district of Gmina Zbiczno, within Brodnica County, Kuyavian-Pomeranian Voivodeship, in north-central Poland.
