= Grabiny =

Grabiny may refer to the following places:

- Grabiny, Brodnica County in Kuyavian-Pomeranian Voivodeship (north-central Poland)
- Grabiny, Lipno County in Kuyavian-Pomeranian Voivodeship (north-central Poland)
- Grabiny, Subcarpathian Voivodeship (south-east Poland)
- Grabiny, Masovian Voivodeship (east-central Poland)
