= Gmina Górzno =

Gmina Górzno may refer to either of the following administrative districts in Poland:

- Gmina Górzno, Kuyavian-Pomeranian Voivodeship
- Gmina Górzno, Masovian Voivodeship
