= Nowy Dwór, Brodnica County =

Nowy Dwór
- Village
- Location within Poland
- Coordinates: 53°17′N 19°30′E
- Country: Poland
- Voivodeship: Kuyavian-Pomeranian
- County: Brodnica
- Gmina: Gmina Brodnica

Nowy Dwór [ˈnɔvɨ ˈdvur] is a village in the administrative district of Gmina Brodnica, within Brodnica County, Kuyavian-Pomeranian Voivodeship, in north-central Poland.
