= Wybudowanie Michałowo =

- Part of Brodnica
- Location within Poland
- Coordinates: 53°14′51″N 19°25′56″E
- Country: Poland
- Voivodeship: Kuyavian-Pomeranian
- County: Brodnica
- Gmina: Gmina Brodnica

Wybudowanie Michałowo [vɨbudɔˈvaɲɛ mixaˈwɔvɔ] is a part of Brodnica in Gmina Brodnica, within Brodnica County, Kuyavian-Pomeranian Voivodeship, in north-central Poland.
