= Tomki =

Tomki may refer to:

- Tomki, California
- Tomki, New South Wales
- Tomki, Poland
