= Wilamowo, Kuyavian-Pomeranian Voivodeship =

Wilamowo
- Village
- Location within Poland
- Coordinates: 53°16′09″N 19°32′39″E
- Country: Poland
- Voivodeship: Kuyavian-Pomeranian
- County: Brodnica
- Gmina: Bartniczka

Wilamowo [vilaˈmɔvɔ] is a village in the administrative district of Gmina Bartniczka, within Brodnica County, Kuyavian-Pomeranian Voivodeship, in north-central Poland.
