= Podgórz =

Podgórz may refer to:

- Podgórz, Brodnica County, village in Kuyavian-Pomeranian Voivodeship (north-central Poland)
- Podgórz, Nakło County, village in Kuyavian-Pomeranian Voivodeship (north-central Poland)
- Podgórz, Lublin Voivodeship, village (east Poland)
- Podgórz, Toruń, district of the city of Toruń in Kujavian-Pomeranian Voivodeship (north-central Poland).
