= Zdroje, Brodnica County =

Zdroje
- Village
- Location within Poland
- Coordinates: 53°15′N 19°37′E
- Country: Poland
- Voivodeship: Kuyavian-Pomeranian
- County: Brodnica
- Gmina: Bartniczka
- Population: 240

Zdroje [ˈzdrɔjɛ] is a village in the administrative district of Gmina Bartniczka, within Brodnica County, Kuyavian-Pomeranian Voivodeship, in north-central Poland.
