= Sobiesierzno =

- Village
- Location within Poland
- Coordinates: 53°10′39″N 19°30′50″E
- Country: Poland
- Voivodeship: Kuyavian-Pomeranian
- County: Brodnica
- Gmina: Gmina Brodnica
- Population: 140

Sobiesierzno [sɔbjɛˈɕɛʐnɔ] is a village in the administrative district of Gmina Brodnica, within Brodnica County, Kuyavian-Pomeranian Voivodeship, in north-central Poland.
