= Robotno-Fitowo =

- Village
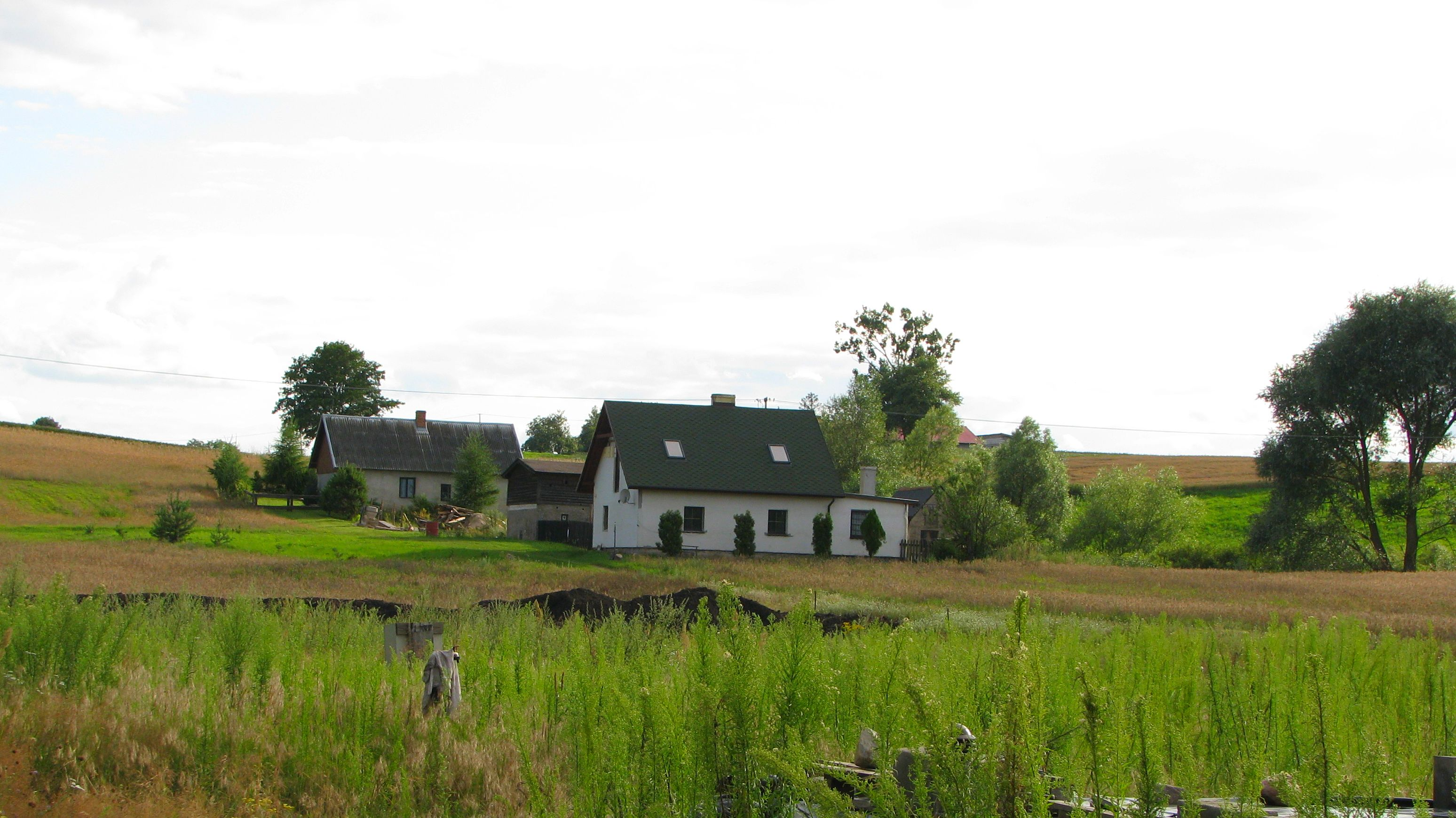

- Location within Poland
- Coordinates: 53°22′44″N 19°22′57″E
- Country: Poland
- Voivodeship: Kuyavian-Pomeranian
- County: Brodnica
- Gmina: Zbiczno

Robotno-Fitowo [rɔˈbɔtnɔ fiˈtɔvɔ] is a village in the administrative district of Gmina Zbiczno, within Brodnica County, Kuyavian-Pomeranian Voivodeship, in north-central Poland.
