= Komorowo, Brodnica County =

Komorowo
- Village
- Location within Poland
- Coordinates: 53°11′48″N 19°31′05″E
- Country: Poland
- Voivodeship: Kuyavian-Pomeranian
- County: Brodnica
- Gmina: Bartniczka
- Population: 416

Komorowo [kɔmɔˈrɔvɔ] is a village in the administrative district of Gmina Bartniczka, within Brodnica County, Kuyavian-Pomeranian Voivodeship, in north-central Poland.
