= Szczutowo =

Szczutowo may refer to:

- Szczutowo, Brodnica County in Kuyavian-Pomeranian Voivodeship (north-central Poland)
- Szczutowo, Golub-Dobrzyń County in Kuyavian-Pomeranian Voivodeship (north-central Poland)
- Szczutowo, Masovian Voivodeship (east-central Poland)
