= Koprowski =

Koprowski (feminine: Koprowska, plural: Koprowscy) is a Polish surname. Notable people with the surname include:

- Franciszek Koprowski (1895–1967), Polish modern pentathlete
- Hilary Koprowski (1916–2013), Polish immunologist
- John L. Koprowski (born 1961), American biologist
- Peter Paul Koprowski (born 1947), Polish-Canadian composer
