= Górzno-Wybudowanie =

- Village
- Location within Poland
- Coordinates: 53°11′00″N 19°36′00″E
- Country: Poland
- Voivodeship: Kuyavian-Pomeranian
- County: Brodnica
- Gmina: Górzno

Górzno-Wybudowanie [ˈɡuʐnɔ vɨbudɔˈvaɲɛ] is a village in the administrative district of Gmina Górzno, within Brodnica County, Kuyavian-Pomeranian Voivodeship, in north-central Poland.
