= Ciche =

Ciche may refer to the following places in Poland:

- Ciche, Kuyavian-Pomeranian Voivodeship, village in the administrative district of Gmina Zbiczno, within Brodnica County, Kuyavian-Pomeranian Voivodeship
- Ciche, Lesser Poland Voivodeship, village in the administrative district of Gmina Czarny Dunajec, within Nowy Targ County, Lesser Poland Voivodeship
