= Gorczenica =

- Village
- Location within Poland
- Coordinates: 53°12′N 19°22′E
- Country: Poland
- Voivodeship: Kuyavian-Pomeranian
- County: Brodnica
- Gmina: Gmina Brodnica

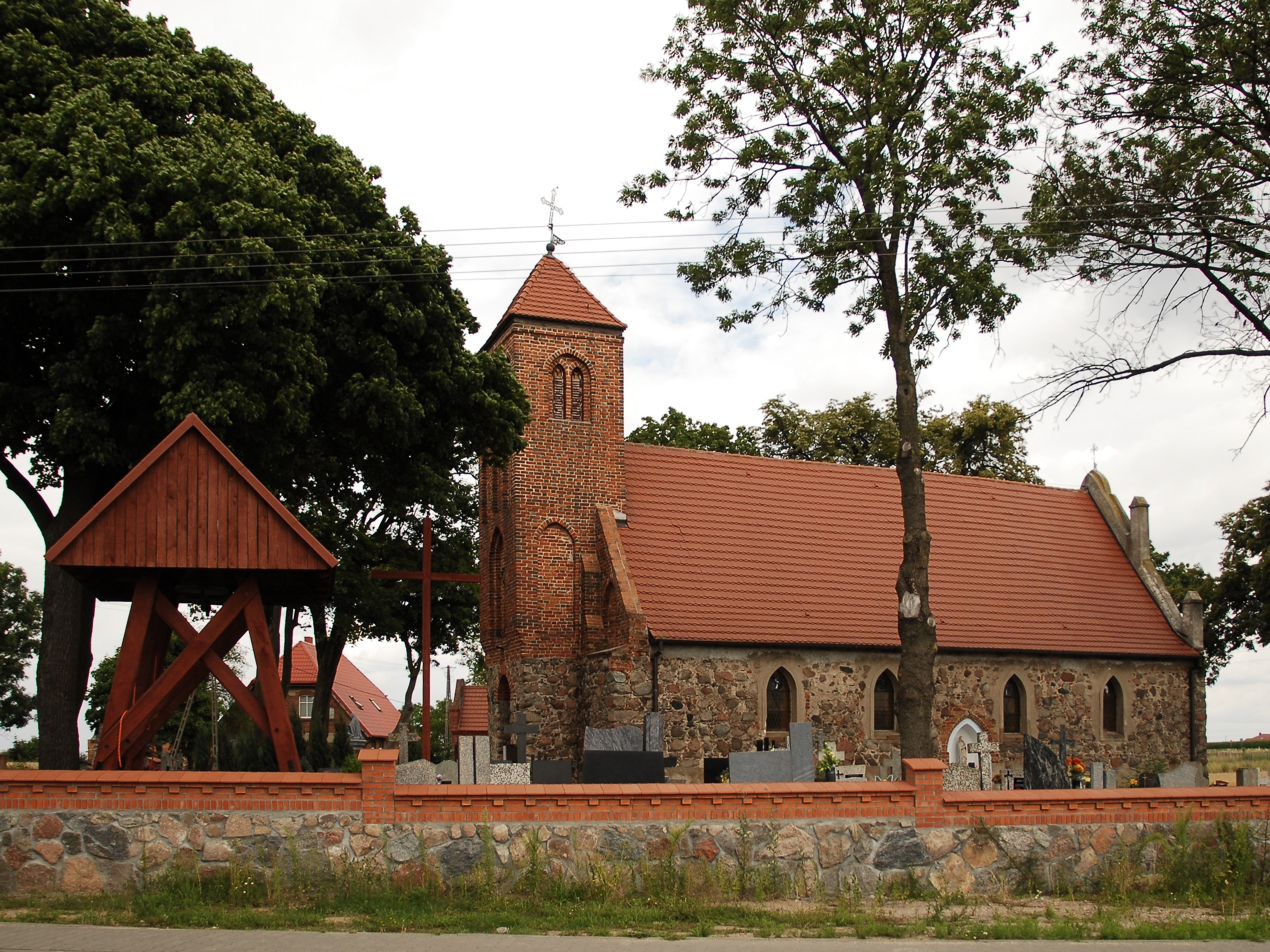
Church of the Holy Cross in Gorczenica, 14th century, later alterations

Gorczenica [ɡɔrt͡ʂɛˈnit͡sa] is a village in the administrative district of Gmina Brodnica, within Brodnica County, Kuyavian-Pomeranian Voivodeship, in north-central Poland.

Historically, it belonged to Michałów Land.
