= Niewierz, Kuyavian-Pomeranian Voivodeship =

Niewierz
- Village
- Location within Poland
- Coordinates: 53°15′N 19°18′E
- Country: Poland
- Voivodeship: Kuyavian-Pomeranian
- County: Brodnica
- Gmina: Gmina Brodnica
- Prefix Code: (+48) 56
- Vehicle registration: CBR

Niewierz [ˈɲɛvjɛʂ] is a village in the administrative district of Gmina Brodnica, within Brodnica County, Kuyavian-Pomeranian Voivodeship, in north-central Poland.
