= Czarny Bryńsk =

- Village
- Location within Poland
- Coordinates: 53°13′N 19°45′E
- Country: Poland
- Voivodeship: Kuyavian-Pomeranian
- County: Brodnica
- Gmina: Górzno

Czarny Bryńsk (Polish pronunciation: [ˈtʂarnɨ ˈbrɨj̃sk]) is a village in the administrative district of Gmina Górzno, within Brodnica County, Kuyavian-Pomeranian Voivodeship, in north-central Poland.
