= Świerczynki =

Świerczynki may refer to various places in Poland:

- Świerczynki, Brodnica County
- Świerczynki, Toruń County
