= Żmijewko =

- Village
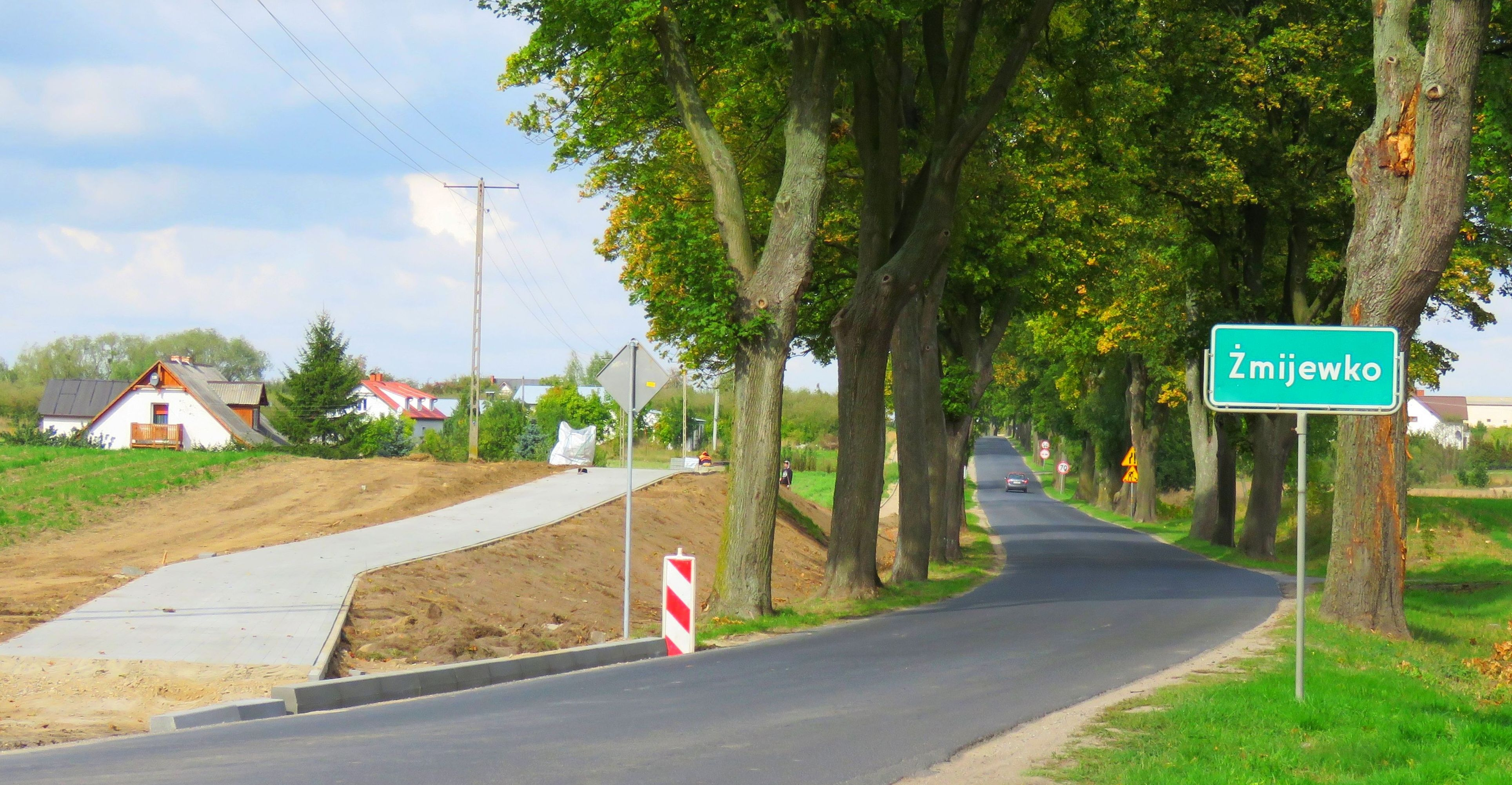

- Location within Poland
- Coordinates: 53°18′55″N 19°22′58″E
- Country: Poland
- Voivodeship: Kuyavian-Pomeranian
- County: Brodnica
- Gmina: Zbiczno
- Population: 120

Żmijewko [ʐmiˈjɛfkɔ] is a village in the administrative district of Gmina Zbiczno, within Brodnica County, Kuyavian-Pomeranian Voivodeship, in north-central Poland.
