= Ławy Drwęczne =

- Village
- Location within Poland
- Coordinates: 53°20′58″N 19°30′54″E
- Country: Poland
- Voivodeship: Kuyavian-Pomeranian
- County: Brodnica
- Gmina: Zbiczno

Ławy Drwęczne [ˈwavɨ ˈdrvɛnt͡ʂnɛ] is a village in the administrative district of Gmina Zbiczno, in Brodnica County, Kuyavian-Pomeranian Voivodeship, in north-central Poland.
