= Zbiczno =

- Village
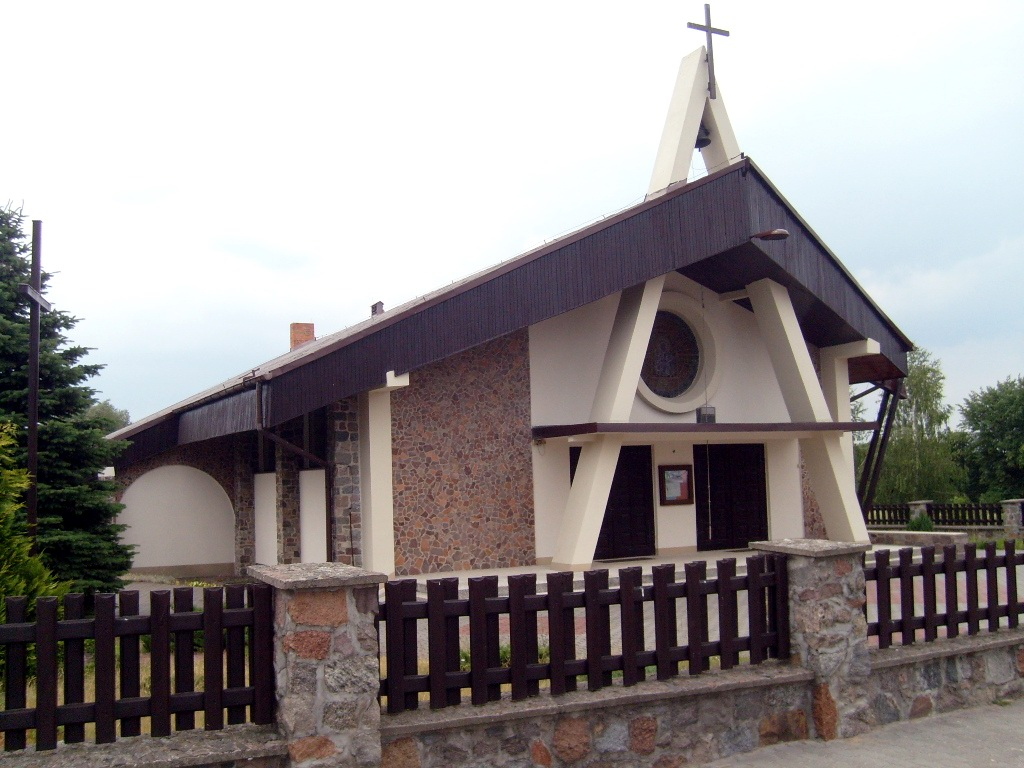
- Church of Our Lady the Queen of Poland

- Location within Poland
- Coordinates: 53°20′4″N 19°22′32″E
- Country: Poland
- Voivodeship: Kuyavian-Pomeranian
- County: Brodnica
- Gmina: Zbiczno

Population
  - Total: 983
- Time zone: UTC+1 (CET)
  - Summer (DST): UTC+2 (CEST)
- Vehicle registration: CBR

Zbiczno [ˈzbit͡ʂnɔ] is a village in Brodnica County, Kuyavian-Pomeranian Voivodeship, in north-central Poland. It is the seat of the gmina (administrative district) called Gmina Zbiczno.

== History ==
During the German occupation of Poland (World War II), the occupiers forced local Poles to sign the Deutsche Volksliste. Those who refused were beaten to death by the Germans, and their bodies were laid in front of the German police station for several days to terrorize the population. Several local Poles, including school teachers, were among the victims of the massacre of Poles from the county committed by the occupiers in 1939 in nearby Brzezinki.

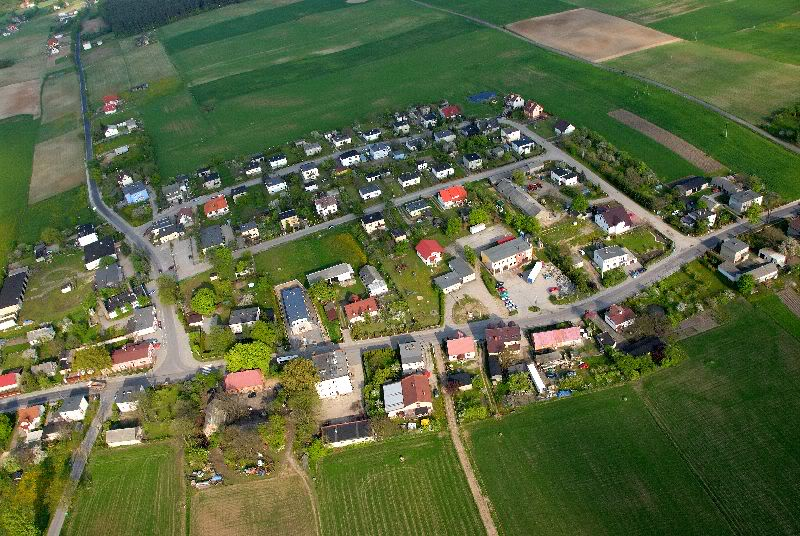

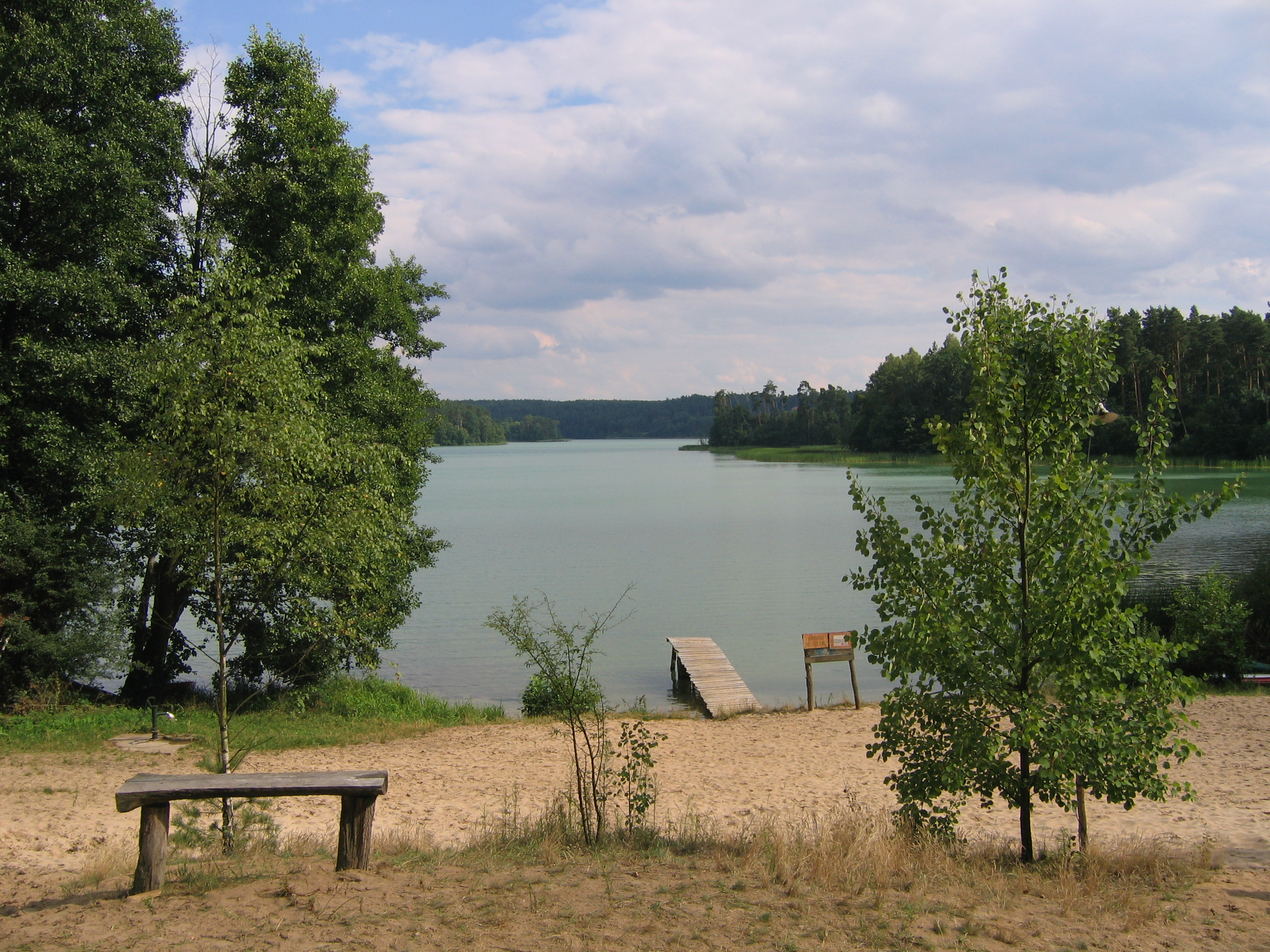
Zbiczno lake
