= Cielęta =

- Village
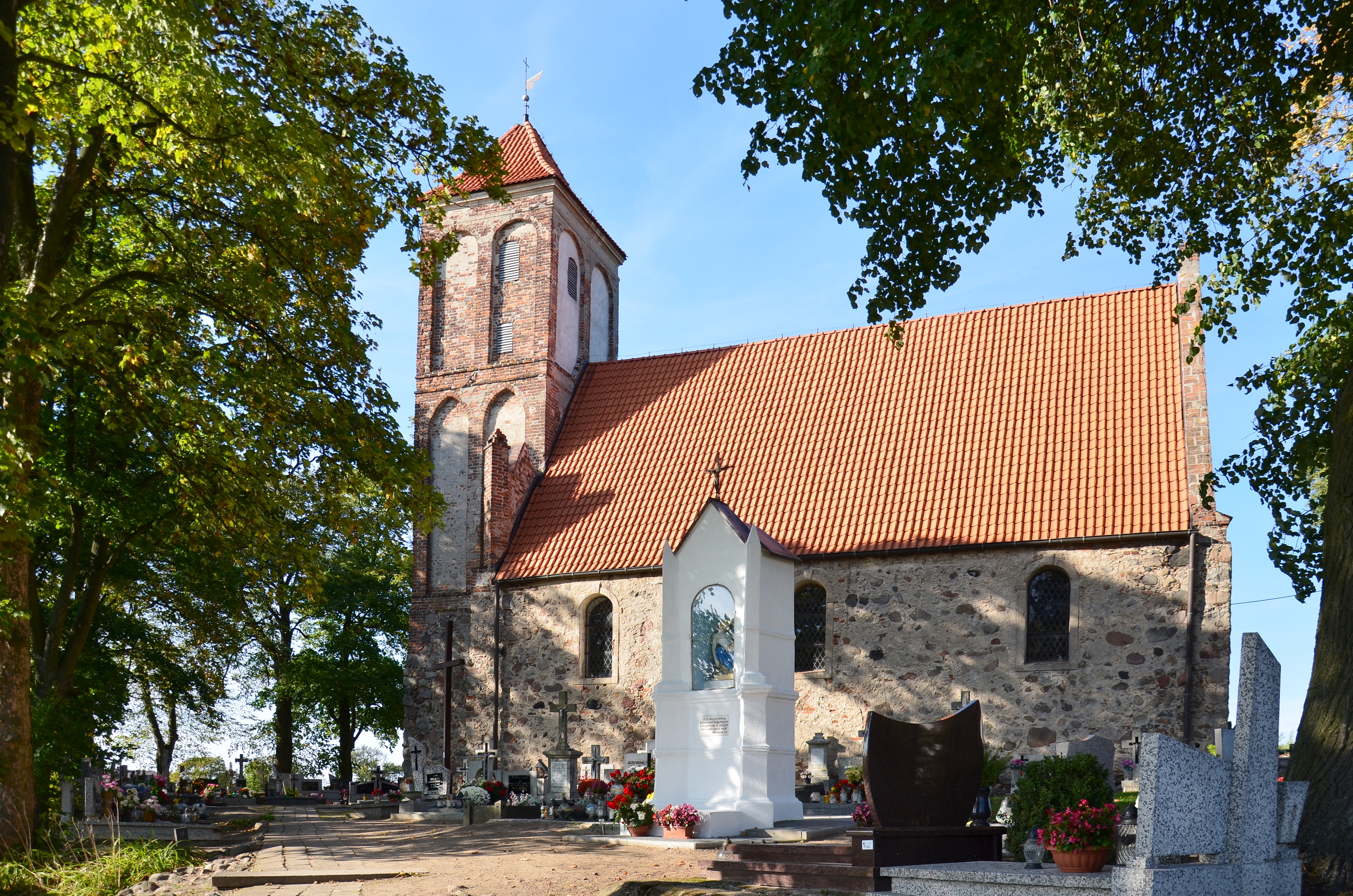
- St. Michel church in Cielęta, 1st half of the 14th century, altered in 1783

- Location within Poland
- Coordinates: 53°15′N 19°28′E
- Country: Poland
- Voivodeship: Kuyavian-Pomeranian
- County: Brodnica
- Gmina: Gmina Brodnica

Cielęta [t͡ɕɛˈlɛnta] is a village in the administrative district of Gmina Brodnica, within Brodnica County, Kuyavian-Pomeranian Voivodeship, in north-central Poland. Historically, it belonged to Michałów Land.
