= Szramowo, Kuyavian-Pomeranian Voivodeship =

Szramowo
- Village
- Location within Poland
- Coordinates: 53°20′N 19°30′E
- Country: Poland
- Voivodeship: Kuyavian-Pomeranian
- County: Brodnica
- Gmina: Zbiczno
- Population: 150

Szramowo [ʂraˈmɔvɔ] is a village in the administrative district of Gmina Zbiczno, within Brodnica County, Kuyavian-Pomeranian Voivodeship, in north-central Poland.
