= Rosochy, Kuyavian-Pomeranian Voivodeship =

Rosochy
- Village
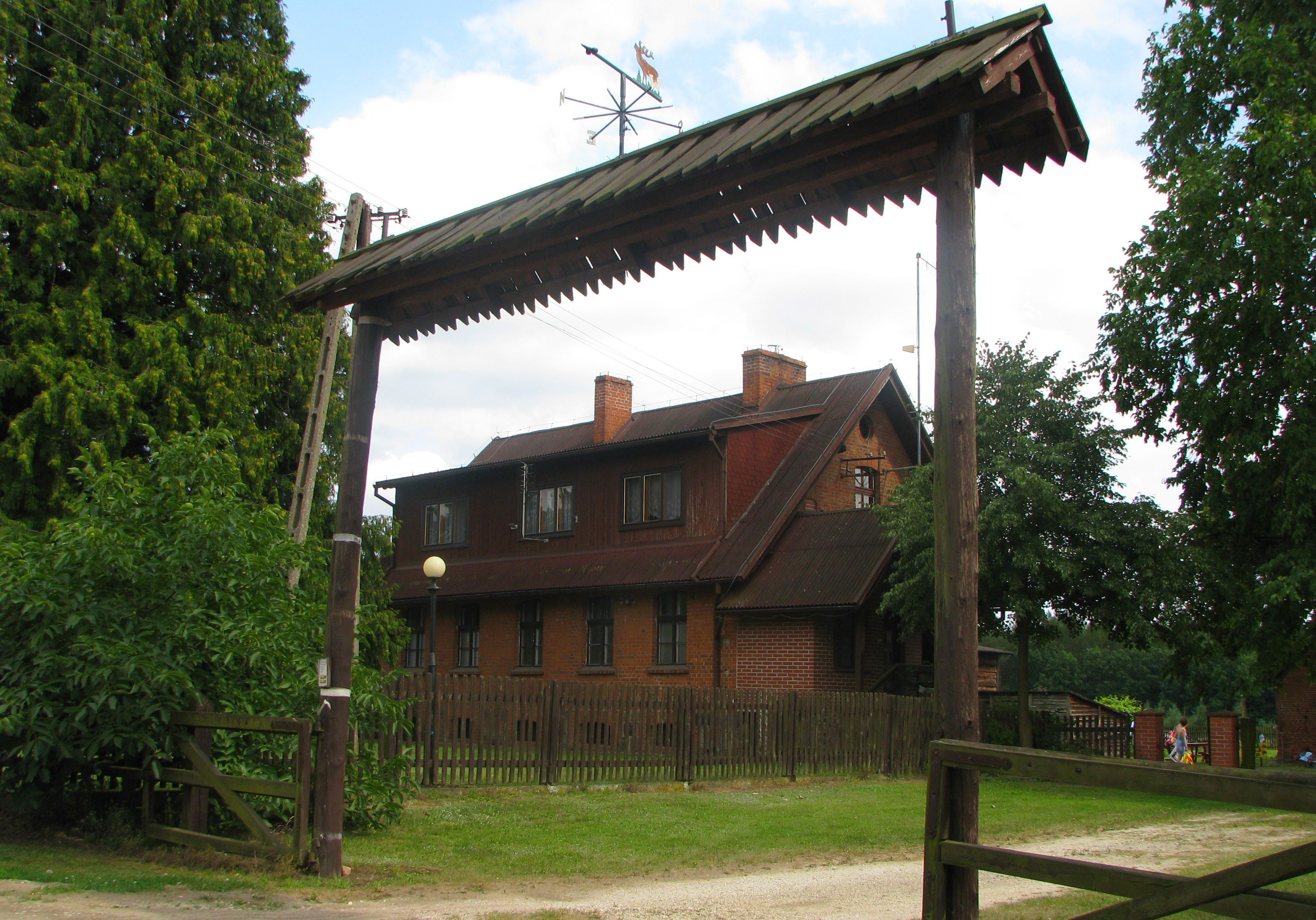

- Location within Poland
- Coordinates: 53°23′47″N 19°18′35″E
- Country: Poland
- Voivodeship: Kuyavian-Pomeranian
- County: Brodnica
- Gmina: Zbiczno

Rosochy [rɔˈsɔxɨ] is a village in the administrative district of Gmina Zbiczno, within Brodnica County, Kuyavian-Pomeranian Voivodeship, in north-central Poland.
