= Radoszki, Kuyavian-Pomeranian Voivodeship =

Radoszki
- Village
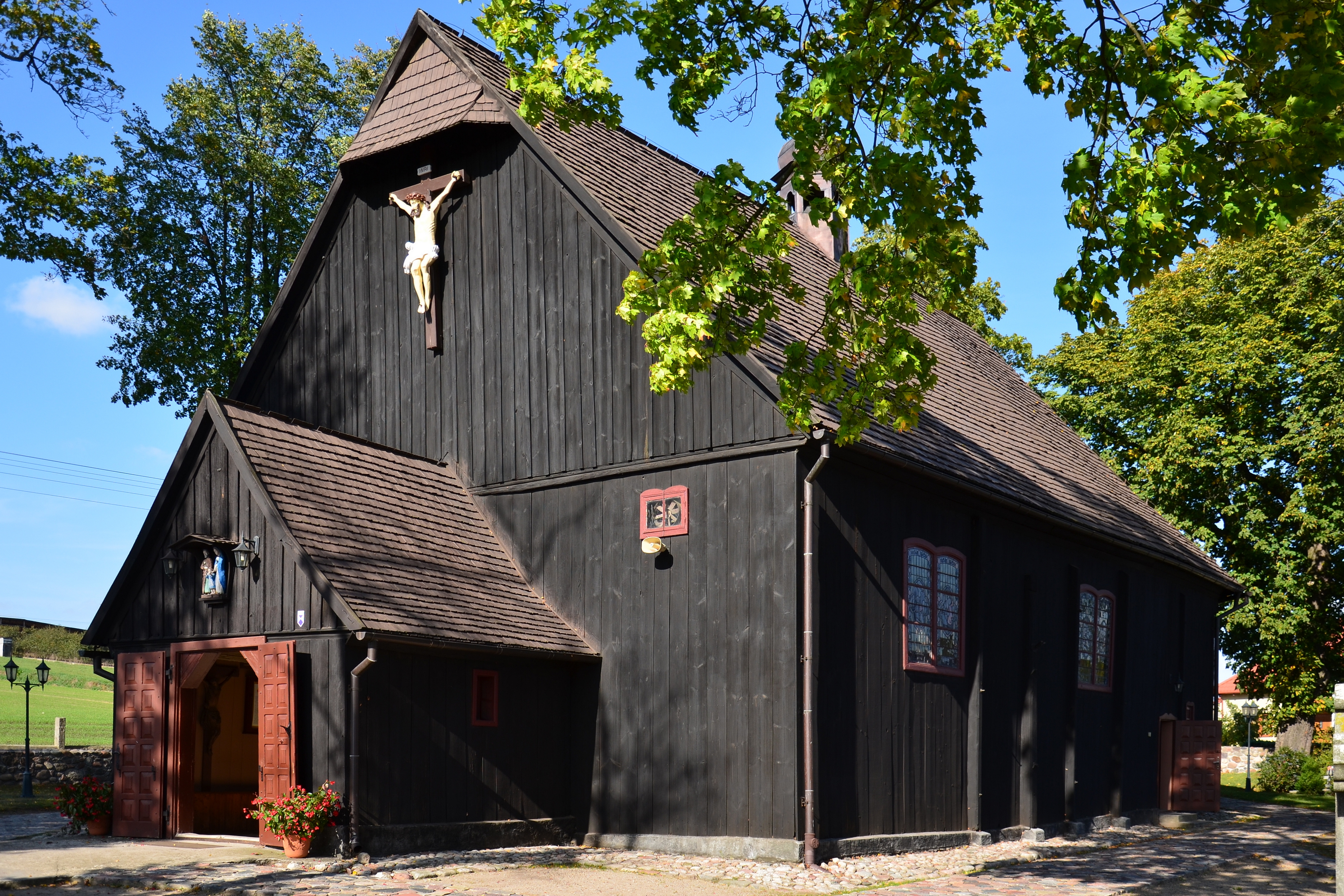
- Saints Lawrence and Nicholas church in Radoszki

- Location within Poland
- Coordinates: 53°15′26″N 19°38′13″E
- Country: Poland
- Voivodeship: Kuyavian-Pomeranian
- County: Brodnica
- Gmina: Bartniczka
- Population: 800
- Time zone: UTC+1 (CET)
  - Summer (DST): UTC+2 (CEST)
- Vehicle registration: CBR

Radoszki [raˈdɔʂki] is a village in the administrative district of Gmina Bartniczka, within Brodnica County, Kuyavian-Pomeranian Voivodeship, in north-central Poland.

== History ==
In 1868, the village had a population of 432, which grew to 542 by 1885.

During the German occupation of Poland (World War II), the occupiers forced local Poles to sign the Deutsche Volksliste. Those who refused were beaten to death by the Germans, and their bodies were laid in front of the German police station for several days to terrorize the population.
