= Gaj-Grzmięca =

- Village
- Location within Poland
- Coordinates: 53°20′33″N 19°26′51″E
- Country: Poland
- Voivodeship: Kuyavian-Pomeranian
- County: Brodnica
- Gmina: Zbiczno
- Population: 110

Gaj-Grzmięca (Polish pronunciation: [ɡaj ˈɡʐmjɛntsa]) is a village in the administrative district of Gmina Zbiczno, within Brodnica County, Kuyavian-Pomeranian Voivodeship, in north-central Poland.
