= Moczadła =

Moczadła may refer to:

- Moczadła, Brodnica County, Poland
- Moczadła, Lipno County, Poland
