= Górzno-Lidzbark Landscape Park =

Protected area (Landscape Park) in north-central Poland

- Górznieńsko-Lidzbarski Park Krajobrazowy
- IUCN category V (protected landscape/seascape)

- Location within Poland
- Location: north-central Poland
- Coordinates: 53.152°N 19.763°E
- Area: 189.66 km^{2} (73.23 sq mi)
- Established: 1990

Górzno-Lidzbark Landscape Park (Górznieńsko-Lidzbarski Park Krajobrazowy) is a protected area (Landscape Park) in north-central Poland, established in 1990, covering an area of 189.66 square kilometres (73.23 sq mi).

The Park is shared between three voivodeships: Kuyavian-Pomeranian, Masovian and Warmian-Masurian. Within Kuyavian-Pomeranian Voivodeship it lies in Brodnica County (Gmina Brzozie, Gmina Górzno, Gmina Bartniczka, Gmina Świedziebnia). Within Masovian Voivodeship it lies in Żuromin County (Gmina Lubowidz). Within Warmian-Masurian Voivodeship it lies in Działdowo County (Gmina Lidzbark).

Within the Landscape Park are six nature reserves.
