= Sokołowo, Brodnica County =

Sokołowo
- Village
- Location within Poland
- Coordinates: 53°13′28″N 19°30′28″E
- Country: Poland
- Voivodeship: Kuyavian-Pomeranian
- County: Brodnica
- Gmina: Bartniczka
- Population: 70

Sokołowo [sɔkɔˈwɔvɔ] is a village in the administrative district of Gmina Bartniczka, within Brodnica County, Kuyavian-Pomeranian Voivodeship, in north-central Poland.
