= Gmina Bartniczka =

Gmina Bartniczka Bartniczka Commune
- Gmina
- Flag Coat of arms
- Interactive map of Gmina Bartniczka
- Coordinates (Bartniczka): 53°15′N 19°36′E
- Country: Poland
- Voivodeship: Kuyavian-Pomeranian
- County: Brodnica
- Seat: Bartniczka

Area
  - Total: 83.35 km^{2} (32.18 sq mi)

Population (2011)
  - Total: 4,714
  - Density: 56.56/km^{2} (146.5/sq mi)
- Website: http://ugbartniczka.pl/

Gmina Bartniczka is a rural gmina (administrative district) in Brodnica County, Kuyavian-Pomeranian Voivodeship, in north-central Poland. Its seat is the village of Bartniczka, which lies approximately 14 kilometres (9 mi) east of Brodnica and 70 km (43 mi) east of Toruń.

The gmina covers an area of 83.35 square kilometres (32.2 sq mi), and as of 2006 its total population is 4,570 (4,714 in 2011).

The gmina contains part of the protected area called Górzno-Lidzbark Landscape Park.

== Villages ==
Gmina Bartniczka contains the villages and settlements of Bartniczka, Belfort, Długi Most, Gołkówko, Grążawy, Gutowo, Igliczyzna, Iły, Jastrzębie, Komorowo, Koziary, Łaszewo, Nowa Igliczyzna, Nowe Świerczyny, Radoszki, Samin, Skrobacja, Sokołowo, Stare Świerczyny, Świerczynki, Wilamowo and Zdroje.

== Neighbouring gminas ==
Gmina Bartniczka is bordered by the gminas of Brodnica, Brzozie, Górzno, Lidzbark and Świedziebnia.
