= Brzezinki, Kuyavian-Pomeranian Voivodeship =

Brzezinki
- Village
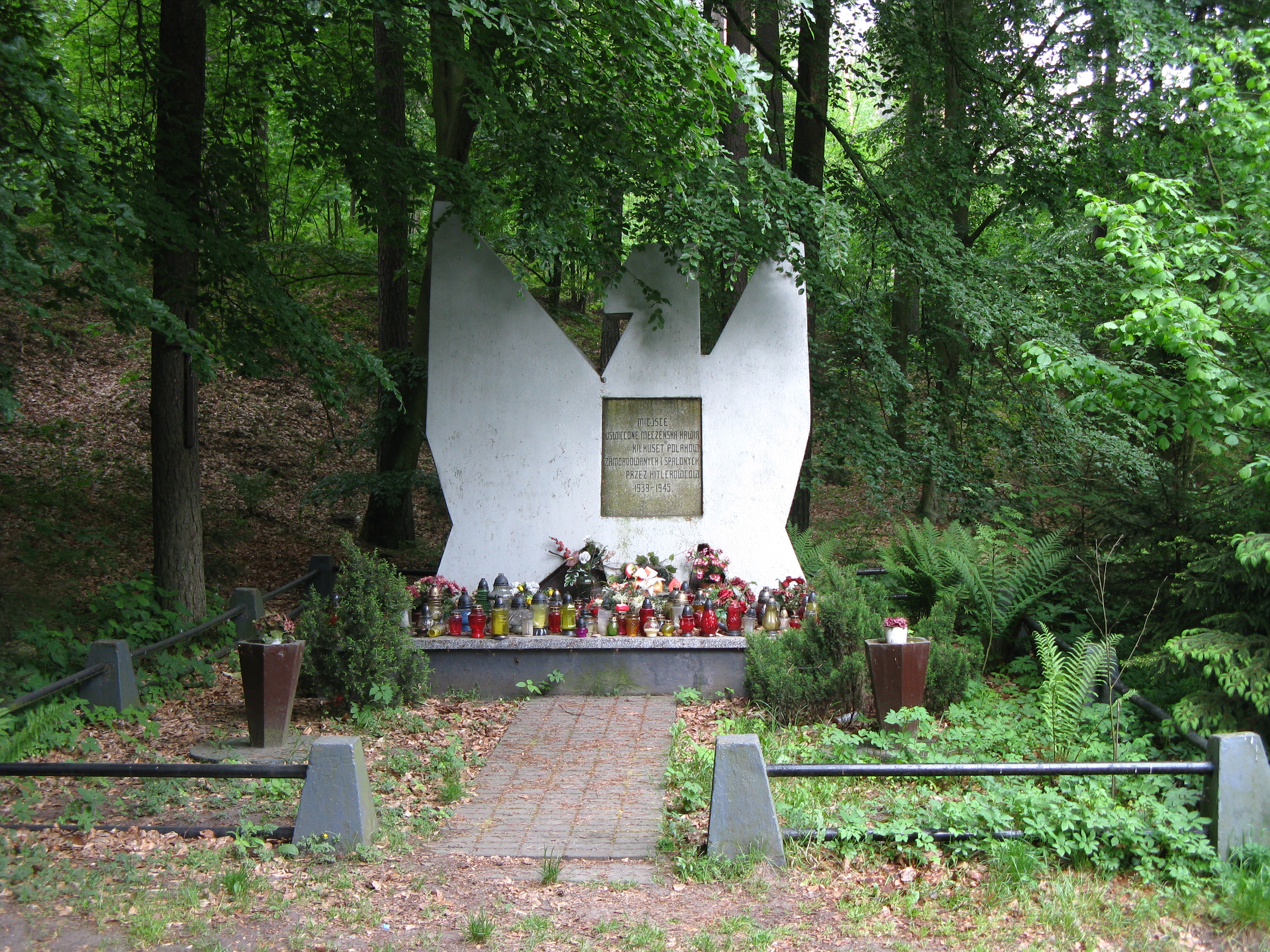
- Monument to the victims of Nazi German massacre in 1939

- Location within Poland
- Coordinates: 53°18′37″N 19°24′31″E
- Country: Poland
- Voivodeship: Kuyavian-Pomeranian
- County: Brodnica
- Gmina: Zbiczno

Population
  - Total: 240
- Time zone: UTC+1 (CET)
  - Summer (DST): UTC+2 (CEST)
- Vehicle registration: CBR

Brzezinki [bʐɛˈʑinki] is a village in the administrative district of Gmina Zbiczno, within Brodnica County, Kuyavian-Pomeranian Voivodeship, in north-central Poland.

== History ==
On 15 August 1920, during the Polish–Soviet War, the village was occupied by the Russian 4th Army, before it was eventually recaptured by the Poles on 18 August.

During the German occupation of Poland (World War II), in autumn of 1939, the Nazi German police and Selbstschutz executed around 400 Polish civilians from Brodnica, Brzezinki and other nearby villages, in the forest in Brzezinki. The massacre was part of the genocidal Intelligenzaktion campaign aimed at exterminating Polish intelligentsia. In 1944, the occupiers burnt the bodies of the victims to cover up the crime.

== Notable people ==
- Franciszek Koprowski (1895–1967), Polish military officer, Olympic modern pentathlete, member of the Cichociemni and Home Army during World War II
