= Szczutowo, Brodnica County =

Szczutowo
- Village
- Location within Poland
- Coordinates: 53°11′52″N 19°34′3″E
- Country: Poland
- Voivodeship: Kuyavian-Pomeranian
- County: Brodnica
- Gmina: Górzno

Szczutowo [ʂt͡ʂuˈtɔvɔ] is a village in the administrative district of Gmina Górzno, within Brodnica County, Kuyavian-Pomeranian Voivodeship, in north-central Poland.
