= Ciche, Kuyavian-Pomeranian Voivodeship =

Ciche
- Village
- Location within Poland
- Coordinates: 53°22′52″N 19°22′36″E
- Country: Poland
- Voivodeship: Kuyavian-Pomeranian
- County: Brodnica
- Gmina: Zbiczno
- Population: 680
- Website: https://ciche.pl

Ciche [ˈt͡ɕixɛ] is a village in the administrative district of Gmina Zbiczno, within Brodnica County, Kuyavian-Pomeranian Voivodeship, in north-central Poland.
