= Świerczynki, Brodnica County =

Świerczynki
- Village
- Location within Poland
- Coordinates: 53°6′N 18°32′E
- Country: Poland
- Voivodeship: Kuyavian-Pomeranian
- County: Brodnica
- Gmina: Bartniczka
- Population: 120

Świerczynki (Polish: [ɕfjɛrˈt͡ʂɨnkʲi]) is a village in the administrative district of Gmina Bartniczka, within Brodnica County, Kuyavian-Pomeranian Voivodeship, in north-central Poland.
