= Moczadła, Brodnica County =

Moczadła
- Village
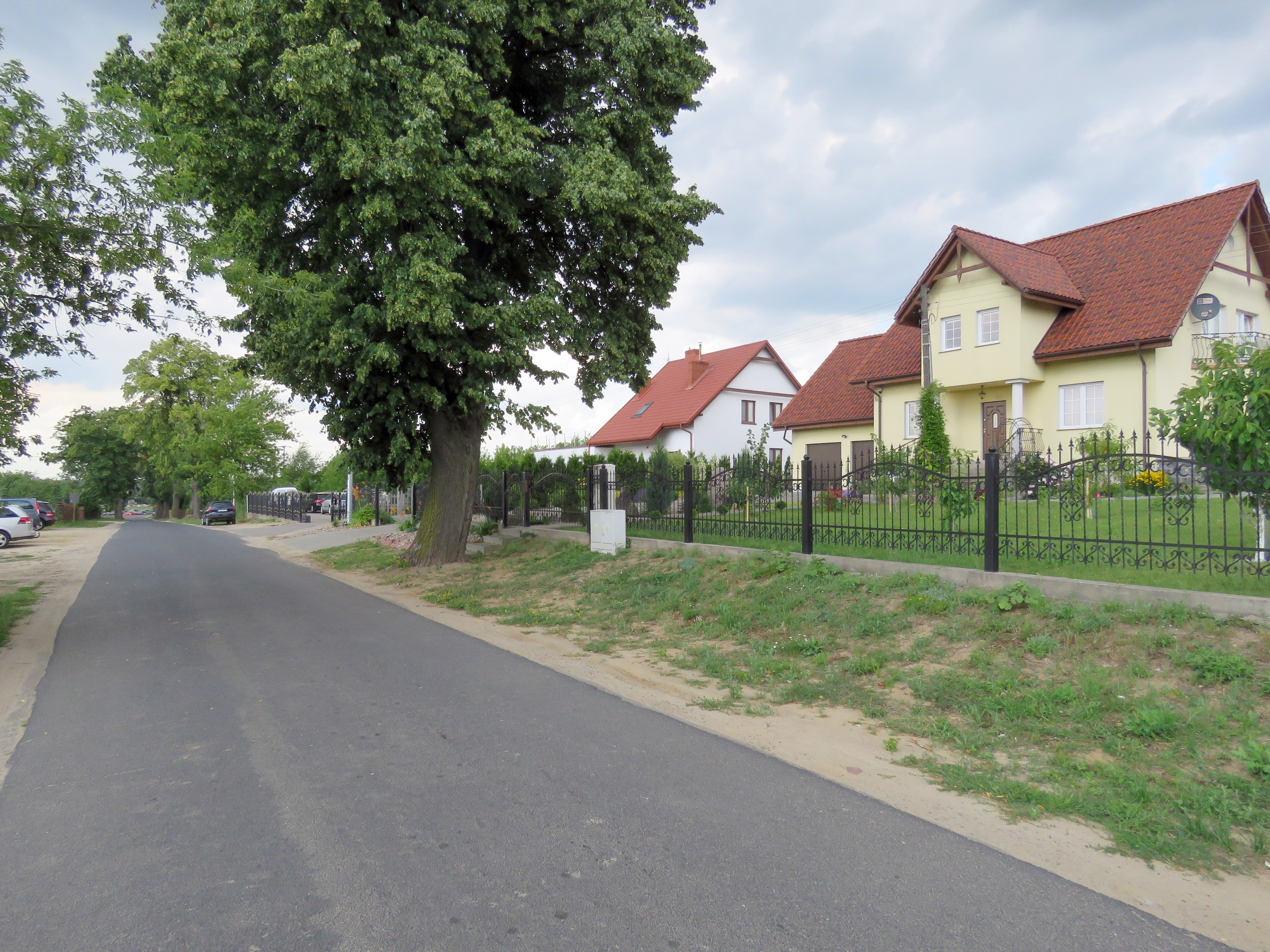

- Location within Poland
- Coordinates: 53°12′50″N 19°24′11″E
- Country: Poland
- Voivodeship: Kuyavian-Pomeranian
- County: Brodnica
- Gmina: Gmina Brodnica

Moczadła [mɔˈt͡ʂadwa] is a village in the administrative district of Gmina Brodnica, within Brodnica County, Kuyavian-Pomeranian Voivodeship, in north-central Poland.
