= Brodnica Landscape Park =

Protected area (Landscape Park) in north-central Poland

- Brodnicki Park Krajobrazowy
- IUCN category V (protected landscape/seascape)
- Logo of park
- Interactive map of Brodnica Landscape Park
- Location: north-central Poland
- Coordinates: 53.387°N 19.38°E
- Area: 136.74 km^{2} (52.80 mi^{2})
- Established: 1985

Brodnica Landscape Park (Brodnicki Park Krajobrazowy) is a protected area (Landscape Park) in north-central Poland, established in 1985, covering an area of 136.74 square kilometres (52.80 sq mi).

The Park is shared between two voivodeships: Kuyavian-Pomeranian Voivodeship and Warmian-Masurian Voivodeship. Within Kuyavian-Pomeranian Voivodeship it lies in Brodnica County (Gmina Jabłonowo Pomorskie, Gmina Zbiczno). Within Warmian-Masurian Voivodeship it lies in Nowe Miasto County (Gmina Biskupiec, Gmina Kurzętnik).

Within the Landscape Park are seven nature reserves.
