= Gmina Zbiczno =

Gmina Zbiczno Zbiczno Commune
- Gmina
- Coat of arms
- Interactive map of Gmina Zbiczno
- Coordinates (Zbiczno): 53°20′4″N 19°22′32″E
- Country: Poland
- Voivodeship: Kuyavian-Pomeranian
- County: Brodnica
- Seat: Zbiczno

Area
  - Total: 132.9 km^{2} (51.3 sq mi)

Population (2011)
  - Total: 4,719
  - Density: 35.51/km^{2} (91.97/sq mi)
- Website: Archive

Gmina Zbiczno is a rural gmina (administrative district) in Brodnica County, Kuyavian-Pomeranian Voivodeship, in north-central Poland. Its seat is the village of Zbiczno, which lies approximately 10 kilometres (6 mi) north of Brodnica and 61 km (38 mi) north-east of Toruń.

The gmina covers an area of 132.9 square kilometres (51.3 sq mi); as of 2006, its total population is 4,467 (4,719 in 2011).

The gmina contains part of the protected area called Brodnica Landscape Park.

== Villages ==
Gmina Zbiczno contains the following villages and settlements: Bachotek, Brzezinki, Ciche, Czyste Błota, Gaj-Grzmięca, Głowin, Godziszka, Grabiny, Grzmięca, Kaługa, Karaś, Koń, Ładnówko, Ławy Drwęczne, Lipowiec, Mieliwo, Najmowo, Pokrzydowo, Robotno, Robotno-Fitowo, Rosochy, Równica, Rytebłota, Sosno Szlacheckie, Staw, Strzemiuszczek, Sumówko, Sumowo, Szramowo, Tęgowiec, Tomki, Wysokie Brodno, Zarośle, Zastawie, Zbiczno, Żmijewko and Żmijewo.

== Neighbouring gminas ==
Gmina Zbiczno is bordered by the town of Brodnica and by the gminas of Biskupiec, Bobrowo, Brodnica, Brzozie, Jabłonowo Pomorskie and Kurzętnik.
