= Podgórz, Brodnica County =

Podgórz
- Village
- Location within Poland
- Coordinates: 53°14′N 19°26′E
- Country: Poland
- Voivodeship: Kuyavian-Pomeranian
- County: Brodnica
- Gmina: Gmina Brodnica

Podgórz [ˈpɔdɡuʂ] is a village in the administrative district of Gmina Brodnica, within Brodnica County, Kuyavian-Pomeranian Voivodeship, in north-central Poland.
