= Gmina Brodnica, Kuyavian-Pomeranian Voivodeship =

Gmina Brodnica Brodnica Commune
- Gmina
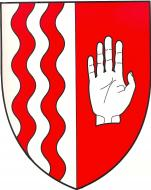
- Flag Coat of arms
- Interactive map of Gmina Brodnica
- Coordinates (Brodnica): 53°15′N 19°24′E
- Country: Poland
- Voivodeship: Kuyavian-Pomeranian
- County: Brodnica
- Seat: Brodnica

Area
  - Total: 126.96 km^{2} (49.02 sq mi)

Population (2011)
  - Total: 7,441
  - Density: 58.61/km^{2} (151.8/sq mi)
- Website: http://www.brodnica.ug.gov.pl

Gmina Brodnica is a rural gmina (administrative district) in Brodnica County, Kuyavian-Pomeranian Voivodeship, in north-central Poland. Its seat is the town of Brodnica, although the town is not part of the territory of the gmina.

The gmina covers an area of 126.96 square kilometres (49.0 sq mi), and as of 2006 its total population is 6,524.

== Villages ==
Gmina Brodnica contains the villages and settlements of Cielęta, Dzierżno, Gorczenica, Gorczeniczka, Gortatowo, Karbowo, Kominy, Kozi Róg, Kruszynki, Moczadła, Niewierz, Nowy Dwór, Opalenica, Podgórz, Sobiesierzno, Szabda, Szczuka, Szymkowo and Wybudowanie Michałowo.

== Neighbouring gminas ==
Gmina Brodnica is bordered by the town of Brodnica and by the gminas of Bartniczka, Bobrowo, Brzozie, Osiek, Świedziebnia, Wąpielsk and Zbiczno.
