= Tomki, Poland =

Tomki
- Village
- Location within Poland
- Coordinates: 53°20′16″N 19°16′8″E
- Country: Poland
- Voivodeship: Kuyavian-Pomeranian
- County: Brodnica
- Gmina: Zbiczno
- Population: 120

Tomki [ˈtɔmki] is a village in the administrative district of Gmina Zbiczno, within Brodnica County, Kuyavian-Pomeranian Voivodeship, in north-central Poland.
