= Franciszek Koprowski =

Polish modern pentathlete

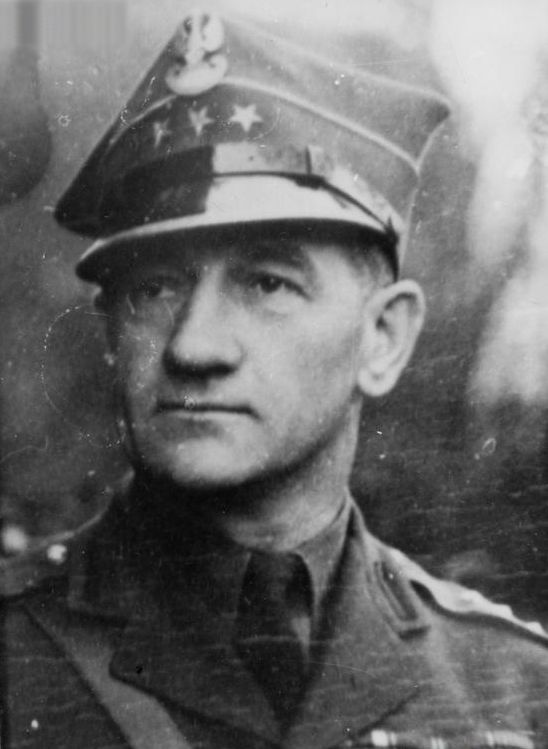
- Franciszek Koprowski (1925-1939)

Personal information
- Born: 11 October 1895 Brzezinki, West Prussia, German Empire
- Died: 2 June 1967 (aged 71) Warsaw, Poland

Sport
- Sport: Modern pentathlon

Franciszek Koprowski (11 October 1895 – 2 June 1967) was a Polish military officer and modern pentathlete. He competed at the 1928 Summer Olympics.

Koprowski enlisted to the Polish Army in 1919, and fought in the infantry regiment in the Polish-Soviet War on the Lithuanian front. After the war, he remained in the military as a professional soldier, eventually becoming a physical training instructor at the Cavalry Training Center in Grudziądz. Since May 1939 he worked at the General Staff of the Polish Armed Forces. After the outbreak of World War II, he initially fought in the Polish Armed Forces in the West. Subsequently, Koprowski was transferred to the Cichociemni resistance group, and parachuted to occupied Poland in March 1943. Koprowski was also an officer of the Armia Krajowa resistance group. In November 1943, he was arrested by Gestapo in Wilno but managed to escape, and rejoined with the Polish Underground, and fought i.a. in the Operation Ostra Brama. After the war Koprowski was arrested by Soviet NKVD and imprisoned in Soviet camps until 1948, when he returned to Poland.

For his service in the fight for Poland's independence, he was awarded the Order of Virtuti Militari and four times the Cross of Valour.
