= Gmina Górzno, Kuyavian-Pomeranian Voivodeship =

Gmina Górzno Górzno Commune
- Gmina
- Coat of arms
- Interactive map of Gmina Górzno
- Coordinates (Górzno): 53°12′N 19°39′E
- Country: Poland
- Voivodeship: Kuyavian-Pomeranian
- County: Brodnica
- Seat: Górzno

Area
  - Total: 119.38 km^{2} (46.09 sq mi)

Population (2011)
  - Total: 3,955
  - Density: 33.13/km^{2} (85.81/sq mi)
  - Urban: 1,398
  - Rural: 2,557
- Website: http://www.gorzno.pl/

Gmina Górzno is an urban-rural gmina (administrative district) in Brodnica County, Kuyavian-Pomeranian Voivodeship, in north-central Poland. Its seat is the town of Górzno, which lies approximately 18 kilometres (11 mi) east of Brodnica and 72 km (45 mi) east of Toruń.

The gmina covers an area of 119.38 square kilometres (46.1 sq mi), and as of 2006 its total population is 3,857 (out of which the population of Górzno amounts to 1,362, and the population of the rural part of the gmina is 2,495).

The gmina contains part of the protected area called Górzno-Lidzbark Landscape Park.

== Villages ==
Apart from the town of Górzno, Gmina Górzno contains the villages and settlements of Czarny Bryńsk, Fiałki, Gołkowo, Górzno-Wybudowanie, Miesiączkowo, Szczutowo, Szynkówko and Zaborowo.

== Neighbouring gminas ==
Gmina Górzno is bordered by the gminas of Bartniczka, Lidzbark, Lubowidz and Świedziebnia.
