= Brodnica County =

County in Kuyavian-Pomeranian Voivodeship, Poland

Brodnica County Powiat brodnicki
- County
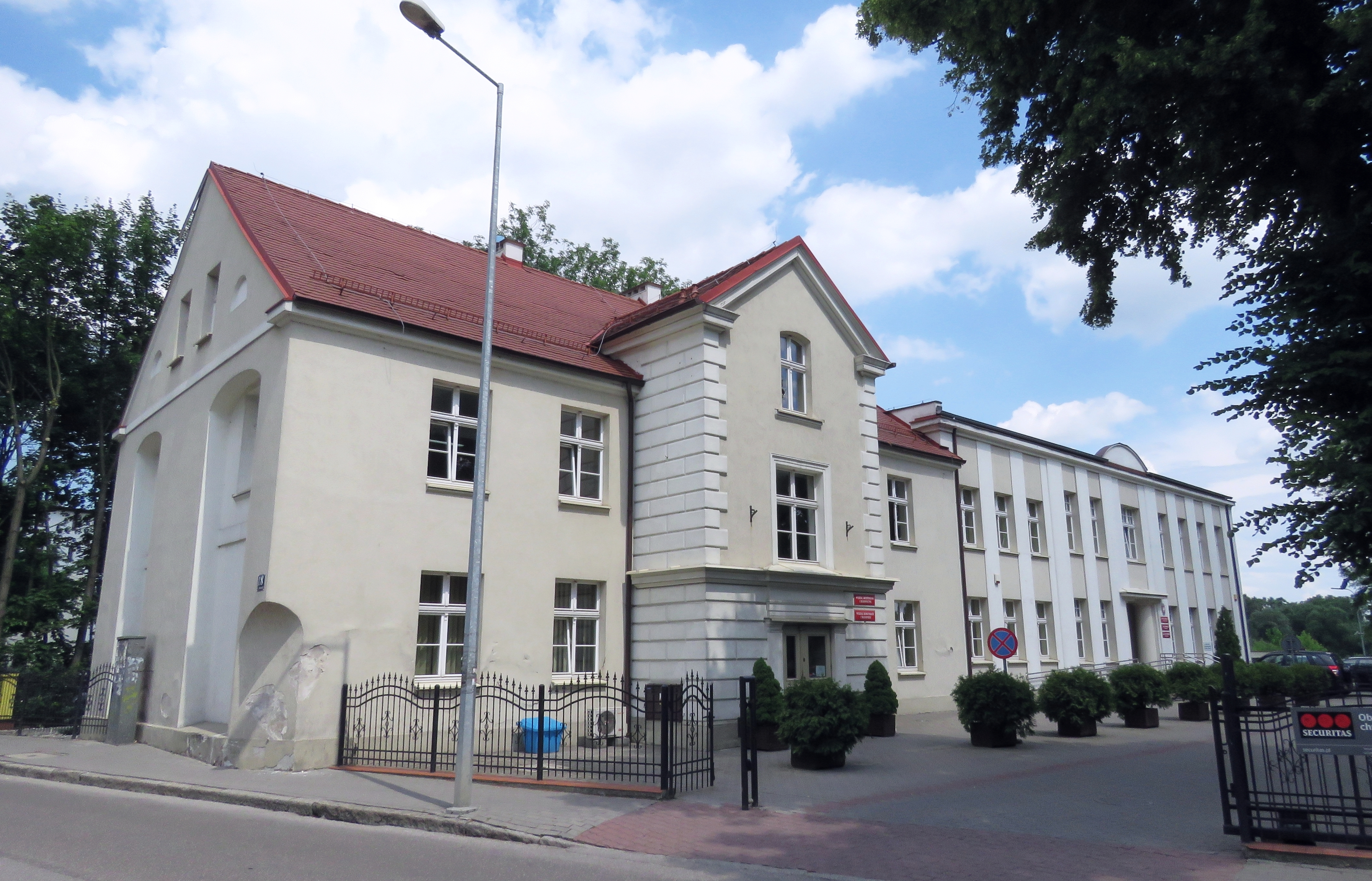

- Flag Coat of arms

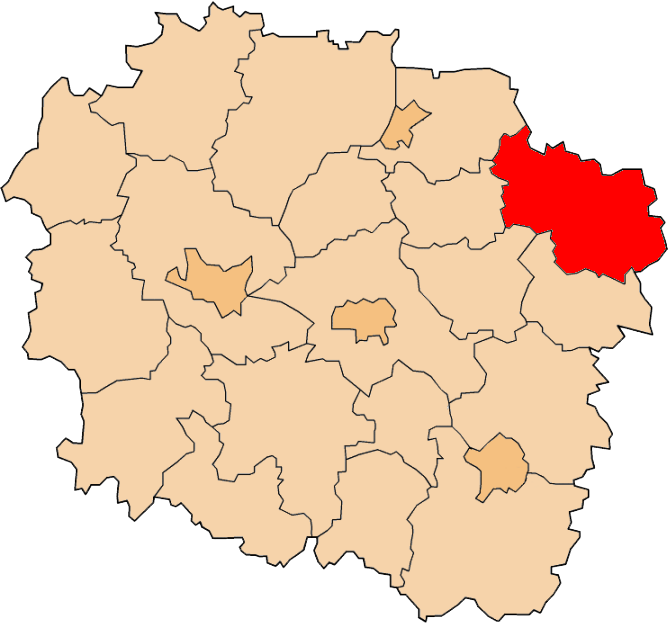
- Location within the voivodeship

- Division into gminas
- Coordinates (Brodnica): 53°15′N 19°24′E
- Country: Poland
- Voivodeship: Kuyavian-Pomeranian
- Seat: Brodnica
- Gminas: Total 10 (incl. 1 urban): Brodnica; Gmina Bartniczka; Gmina Bobrowo; Gmina Brodnica; Gmina Brzozie; Gmina Górzno; Gmina Jabłonowo Pomorskie; Gmina Osiek; Gmina Świedziebnia; Gmina Zbiczno

Area
  - Total: 1,038.79 km^{2} (401.08 sq mi)

Population (2019)
  - Total: 78,935
  - Density: 75.987/km^{2} (196.81/sq mi)
  - Urban: 33,908
  - Rural: 45,027
- Car plates: CBR
- Website: www.brodnica.com.pl

Brodnica County (Polish: powiat brodnicki) is a unit of territorial administration and local government (powiat) in Kuyavian-Pomeranian Voivodeship, north-central Poland. It came into being on January 1, 1999 as a result of the Polish local government reforms passed in 1998. Its administrative seat and largest town is Brodnica, which lies 58 km (36 mi) north-east of Toruń and 95 km (59 mi) east of Bydgoszcz. The county also contains the towns of Jabłonowo Pomorskie, lying 23 km (14 mi) north-west of Brodnica, and Górzno, 18 km (11 mi) east of Brodnica.

The county covers an area of 1,038.79 square kilometres (401.1 sq mi). As of 2019, its total population is 78,935, out of which the population of Brodnica is 28,788, that of Jabłonowo Pomorskie is 3,754, that of Górzno is 1,366, and the rural population is 45,027.

The county includes part of the protected area known as Brodnica Landscape Park.

== Neighbouring counties ==
Brodnica County is bordered by Nowe Miasto County to the north, Działdowo County and Żuromin County to the east, Rypin County to the south, Golub-Dobrzyń County to the south-west, and Wąbrzeźno County and Grudziądz County to the west.

== Administrative divisions ==
The county is subdivided into 10 gminas (one urban, two urban-rural, and seven rural). These are listed in the following table, in descending order of population.

| Gmina | Type | Area (km^{2}) | Population (2019) | Seat |
|---|---|---|---|---|
| Brodnica | urban | 23.2 | 28,788 | |
| Gmina Jabłonowo Pomorskie | urban-rural | 134.4 | 8,914 | Jabłonowo Pomorskie |
| Gmina Brodnica | rural | 127.0 | 8,445 | Brodnica * |
| Gmina Bobrowo | rural | 146.3 | 6,299 | Bobrowo |
| Gmina Świedziebnia | rural | 103.8 | 5,185 | Świedziebnia |
| Gmina Bartniczka | rural | 83.4 | 4,712 | Bartniczka |
| Gmina Zbiczno | rural | 132.9 | 4,876 | Zbiczno |
| Gmina Osiek | rural | 75.1 | 4,014 | Osiek |
| Gmina Górzno | urban-rural | 119.4 | 3,902 | Górzno |
| Gmina Brzozie | rural | 93.7 | 3,800 | Brzozie |
* seat not part of the gmina
