= Boleszyn, Warmian-Masurian Voivodeship =

Boleszyn
- Village
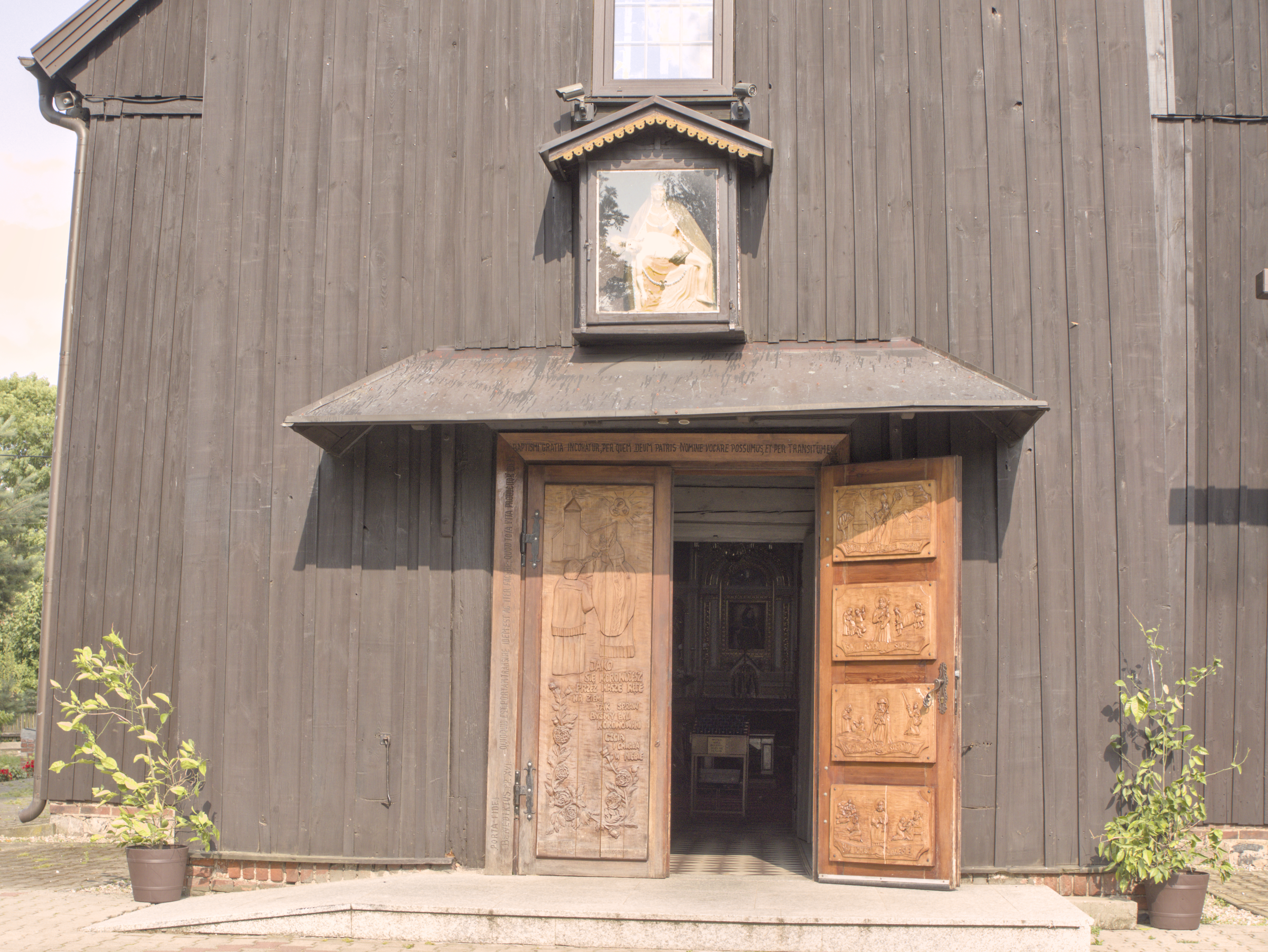
- Church of Saint Martin

- Location within Poland
- Coordinates: 53°19′25″N 19°43′04″E
- Country: Poland
- Voivodeship: Warmian-Masurian
- County: Nowe Miasto
- Gmina: Grodziczno
- Population: 419
- Time zone: UTC+1 (CET)
  - Summer (DST): UTC+2 (CEST)
- Vehicle registration: NNM

Boleszyn [bɔˈlɛʂɨn] is a village in the administrative district of Gmina Grodziczno, within Nowe Miasto County, Warmian-Masurian Voivodeship, in northern Poland.

== Geographical location ==
Boleszyn is located 9.5 km (6 mi) northwest of Lidzbark. The place has the same distance if you come from Grodziczno to Boleszyn from the south-west. Larger towns are Olsztyn in the east and Toruń in the west. The Roman Catholic Parish of St. Martin in Boleszyn belongs to the Diocese of Toruń. However, the responsible administrative district is not the Kuyavian-Pomeranian Voivodeship, but the Warmian–Masurian Voivodeship with the capital Olsztyn.

== History ==
The origins of the place go back to the Middle Ages. The name of the village first appears as Boleschino (1402-1416). Later the names Bollozin (1490), Boleszyn (1570), Bolesino (1647) Bolleszyn (1888) and Bolleschin (1908) can be found. The oldest written mention of the name of the parish can be found in the documents of the Chełmno bishop, where it is mentioned that the church in Radoszki was annexed to the parish in Boleszyn (1414-1416) as a branch church. The church in Boleszyn was under the patronage of the Chełmno chapter. In the second half of the 16th century the commune included the villages: Boleszyn, Wielekie, Leźno, Sugajno, Słup and Zalesie. In the 17th century, during the Polish–Swedish War (1626–1629), the Boleszyn commune lost its independence for a while and was annexed to the Mroczno commune. At the beginning of Modern era there was a one-teacher parish school in Boleszyn, which is mentioned twice in the sources (1647 and 1740). After the First Partition of Poland, the area around Boleszyn was incorporated into the Kingdom of Prussia. According to a decree of September 1, 1848, a mixed patronage was established for Boleszyn, which was exercised by the Bishop of Chełmno in even months and by the Prussian government in odd months. During the First World War, in August 1914, the Imperial Russian Army invaded the Lubawa area and briefly occupied Boleszyn. In January 1920, the area where the Boleszyn commune is located fell to the Second Polish Republic. The community, which at that time consisted of 98% Catholics, belonged to the ecclesiastical deanery of Lidzbark.

During the Second World War (1939-1945), after the invasion of Poland, Boleszyn was incorporated into the Strasburg County (West Prussia) and renamed Bolleschin. This administrative district belonged to the government region Marienwerder. The village already belonged to this Prussian region from 1815 to 1920. From 1874 to 1920 Boleszyn (Bolleschin) was a separate administrative district, which included the rural communities of Bolleszyn, Groß Leszno, Klein Leszno, Kowallik, Slupp, Zalesie, Zembrze and Slupp (forest). After the Treaty of Versailles came into force on January 10, 1920, the County of Strasburg became part of the Republic of Poland and was assigned to the Powiat Brodnicki, whereby Boleszyn lost its right as an administrative district. With the end of the Second World War, the area of the government region Marienwerder then came to the Polish People's Republic. The County of Strasburg was renamed back to Powiat Brodnicki and Bolleschin back to Boleszyn. Since 1989 Boleszyn has belonged to the Third Polish Republic.

== The Roman Catholic Parish Church of St. Martin ==
=== Sanctuary of Our Lady of Sorrows ===
The Parish of St. Martin in Boleszyn was founded in the mid-19th century and originally belonged to the Chełmno chapter. The first church, built in 1653, was a wooden building. The current temple, also made of wood, was built in 1721–1722. The church is known as the Sanctuary of Our Lady of Sorrows, whose cult has been developing since the 17th century. A cholera epidemic broke out in Boleszyn at the turn of the 17th and 18th centuries. Believers turned to the image of the Mother of God to ward off the dangerous disease. Since then, the temple has become a place of pilgrimage.

=== Memorial plaque for the martyr priest Franz Boehm ===
On September 15, 2015, a memorial plaque for the martyr Franz Boehm was inaugurated by Bishop Andrzej Suski of Toruń. An urn filled with soil from the Dachau concentration camp is intended to commemorate the life and suffering of the German parish priest against National Socialism. TBoehm, who had a German father and a Polish mother, was born in Boleszyn on October 3, 1880, and baptised in the church of St. Martin on October 31, 1880. After the family had to leave Boleszyn by order of the Prussian government in 1893, they came to the Rhineland. Franz Boehm was ordained a priest in the Archdiocese of Cologne in 1906. On June 5, 1944, he was arrested by the Gestapo and taken to the Dachau concentration camp. He died there on February 13, 1945.
