= Brzozie =

Brzozie may refer to various places in Poland:

- Brzozie, Brodnica County
- Brzozie, Tuchola County
- Brzozie Lubawskie
- Gmina Brzozie
