= Świecie (disambiguation) =

Świecie is a town in Kuyavian-Pomeranian Voivodeship, north-central Poland.

Świecie may also refer to:

- Świecie, Lower Silesian Voivodeship, village in south-western Poland
- Świecie, Brodnica County, village in Kuyavian-Pomeranian Voivodeship (north-central Poland)
- Świecie Kołobrzeskie, village in West Pomeranian Voivodeship (north-western Poland)
- Świecie nad Osą, village in Kuyavian-Pomeranian Voivodeship (north-central Poland)
- Świecie Odrzańskie, Polish name for Schwedt, town in north-eastern Germany
