= Krzemieniewo =

Krzemieniewo may refer to the following places in Poland:

- Krzemieniewo, Greater Poland Voivodeship (west-central Poland)
- Krzemieniewo, Pomeranian Voivodeship (north Poland)
- Krzemieniewo, Warmian-Masurian Voivodeship (north Poland)
