= Moschen =

Moschen may refer to:

- Mroczno
- Moszna, Opole Voivodeship
- Michael Moschen
