= Franz Boehm =

German parish priest (1880–1945)

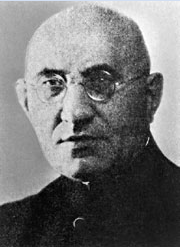
- Born: 3 October 1880; Boleszyn, West Prussia, German Empire (now Grodziczno, Poland)
- Died: 13 February 1945 (aged 64); Dachau concentration camp, Nazi Germany
- Known for: Martyrdom in Dachau

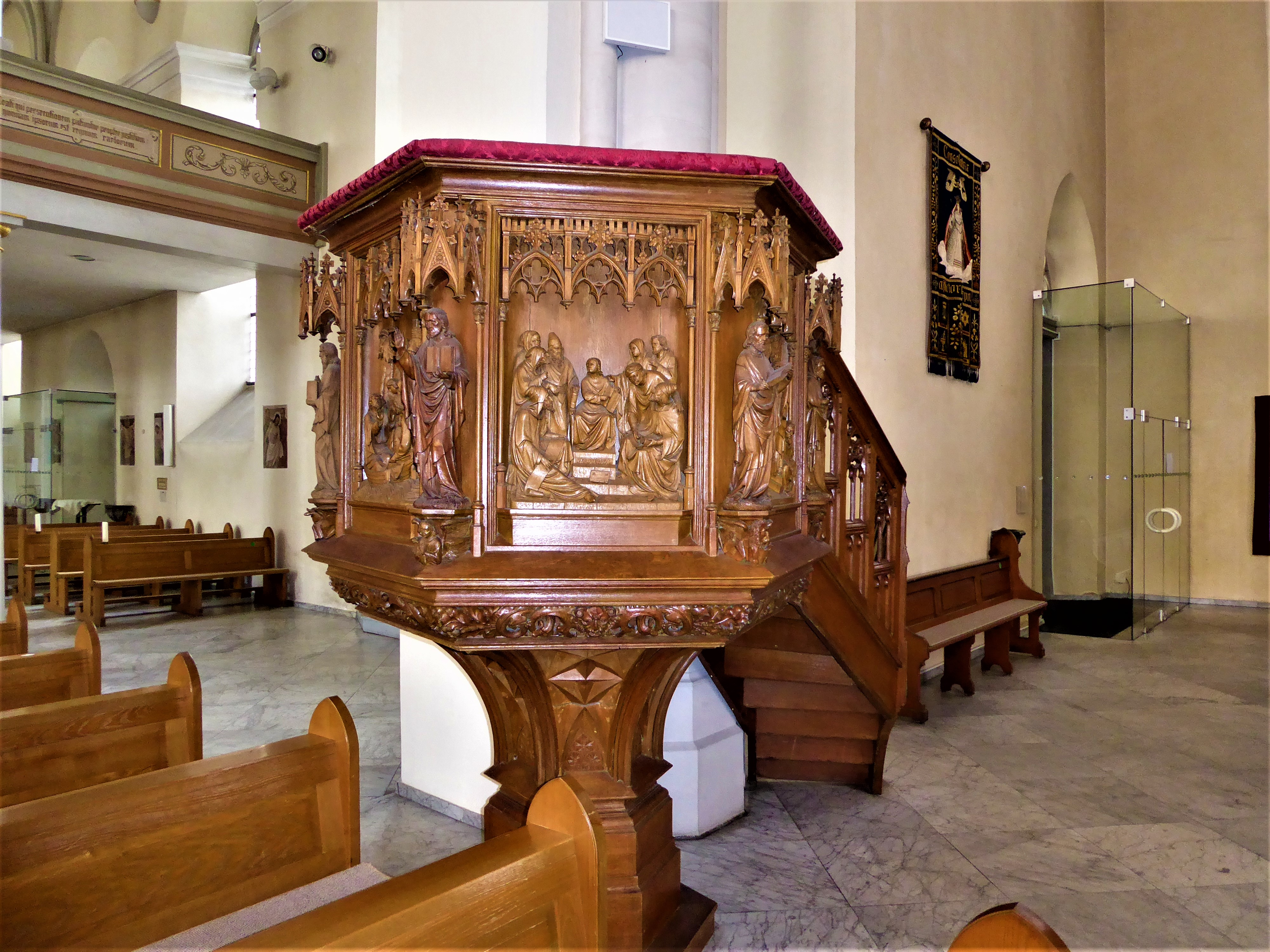
Pulpit of the Church of St. John Before the Latin Gate in Sieglar

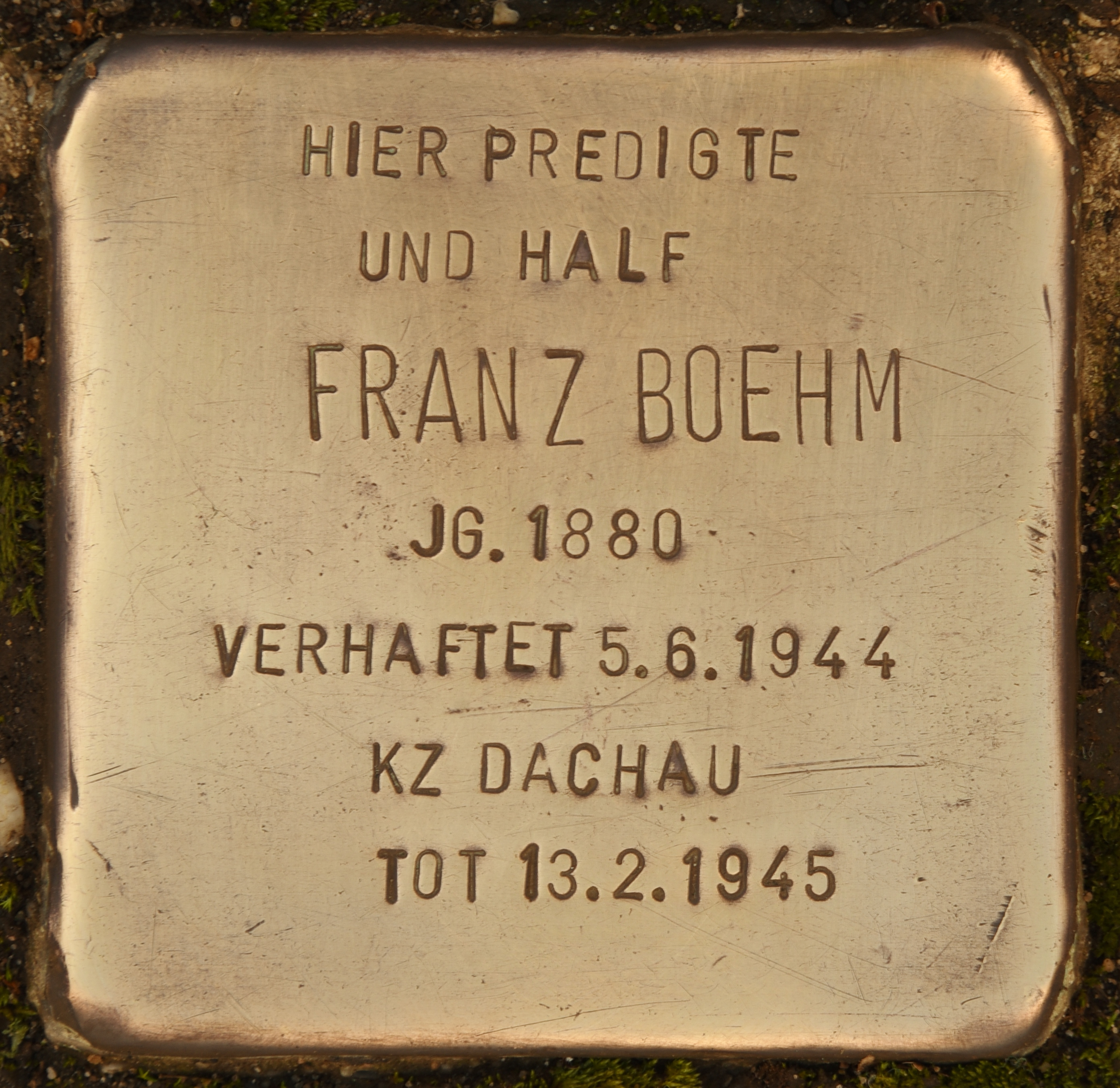
Stolperstein for Franz Boehm (Monheim), giving the dates of his arrest and death

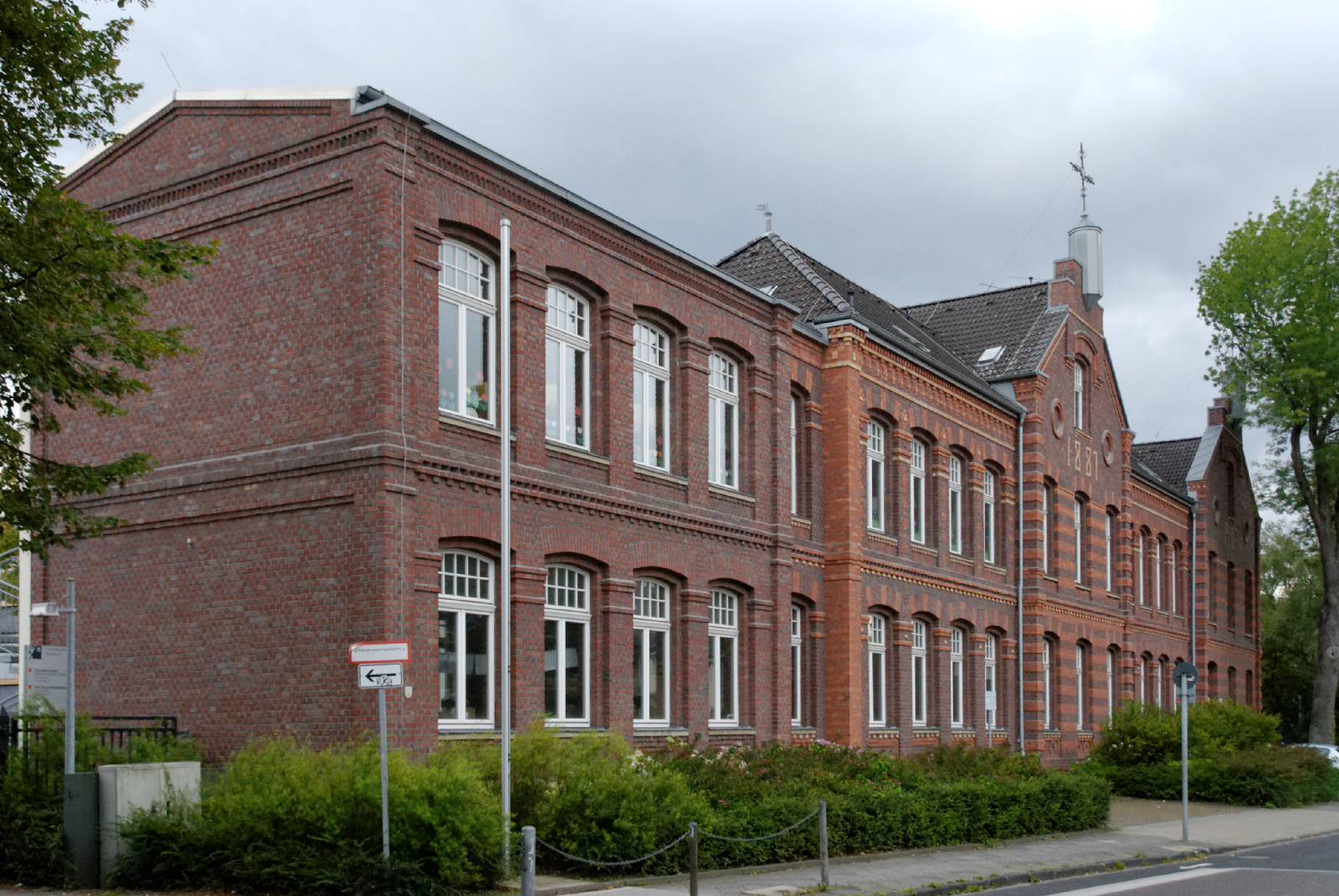
Franz-Boehm-School, Düsseldorf

Franz Boehm (October 3, 1880 in Boleszyn – February 13, 1945 in Dachau concentration camp) was a Roman Catholic priest of the Archdiocese of Cologne and martyr.

== Biography ==
=== Youth and ordination to the priesthood ===
Franz Boehm was born in West Prussia, which is now in the Polish region of the Warmian–Masurian Voivodeship. He came from a family of German-Polish origin. His parents were teachers during the cultural struggle by Otto von Bismarck, which is why the family had to move to the Rhineland in 1893 by order of the authorities. In class, the father had rehearsed with his students a Christian hymn in Polish, such a thing was prohibited in West Prussia during the imperial period due to the Germanisation of the Polish people. Franz Boehm was graduated from a secondary school in Mönchengladbach. After his philosophical and theological studies in Bonn, he was ordained a priest in the Archdiocese of Cologne in 1906. At his three chaplain positions in the Ruhr area, he was also active in the Polish pastoral care, as he spoke the Polish language.

=== First pastoral position in Düsseldorf ===
He took up his first assignment as a parish priest in 1917 at St. Katharina in Düsseldorf. In his parish, he campaigned for the preservation of a Catholic elementary school that now bears his name. In this confrontation, Boehm displayed not only a very good knowledge of the Weimar Constitution, which guaranteed freedom of religion, but also an exceptional talent for motivating people to invigorate the Catholic faith.

=== Resistance to National Socialism ===
On January 4, 1923, Boehm was sent to the newly founded parish of St. John Before the Latin Gate in Sieglar, near Bonn, where he quickly realized that he had to deal with the extreme political currents of the time, communism and national socialism. In his church bulletin and in his sermons from the pulpit, he left no doubt that he considered these two political currents to be incompatible with Christianity. Boehm's resistance to National Socialism became problematic after the Nazis came to power in 1933. Supported by the Nazi mayor of Sieglar, the Gestapo repeatedly investigated Boehm and imposed numerous sanctions. In 1934 there were criminal proceedings, which were discontinued. Boehm's list of alleged misconduct is as long as it is absurd. "Ringing the bells at the return of the pilgrims from Rome and disturbance of the National Socialist May Day celebrations", as well as "irregular flagging of the rectory" and "starting Sunday prayers for captured priests and laypeople" were among the accusations against Boehm.

In 1935, Boehm was banned from teaching religious education. At the same time he received his first expulsion from the governmental district of Cologne, which was lifted again in 1936 by an amnesty. The second and final expulsion followed in 1937. Boehm had to leave Sieglar and wait for the General Vicariate to assign him a new job. However, the archbishop's policy of protecting its own clergy did not make it possible for Boehm to receive a new pastorate directly. In letters, Boehm took the view that he had acted in Sieglar according to the motto "stand fast in one spirit, with one soul striving for the faith of the gospel; and in nothing affrighted by the adversaries" (Phil. 1:27 f.). Therefore, in a letter dated October 12, 1937, he asked the vicar general to "take pity on the physical and mental pressure" and to "assign him to a new place of work as soon as possible".

=== The new parish and the martyrdom in Dachau ===
In 1938, Boehm was sent as a parish priest to Monheim am Rhein. In his priestly work he continued to resist the Nazi regime. Boehm worked primarily with young people. The 450-page Gestapo files show that he received a fine in 1938 and a warning in 1941 for worshipping in Polish. In 1942 he was sentenced to a security payment of 3,000 Reichsmark for a sermon on Christ the King. In his sermon, Boehm affirmed that there were no thousand-year kingdoms on earth, as there was only one kingdom that would last that long, namely the kingdom of Jesus Christ which would last eternal. The Nazis saw this as a violation of the Law for the Stabilization of the Armed Forces. Normally, such an accusation carried the death sentence. But the judges reduced the accusation to "hostile remarks against the state" (similar to a conviction under Pulpit Law). At Easter 1944 Boehm preached against the Nazi film industry, which led to his arrest. On June 5, 1944, he was arrested in the church immediately after a holy mass. In connection with the arrests around the 20 July plot, Boehm was brought to Dachau Concentration Camp. On August 11, 1944, he was taken to Dachau in a single transport because he had obviously been confused with the lawyer and economist Franz Böhm from Mannheim, who belonged to the Freiburg Circles of the German resistance to Nazism. Even a letter from the bishop could not change anything about the imprisonment. He died in the concentration camp on February 13, 1945, as a result of an illness caused by his imprisonment. The parish priest's body was cremated after his death. The ashes were either dumped in a nearby river or scattered on a field.

=== Death in the Dachau concentration camp ===
It is known that numerous medical experiments were carried out on Catholic priests in the Dachau concentration camp. Pastor Boehm's fellow prisoners reported that their brother had several stays in the infirmary of the concentration camp starting in December 1944. His fellow prisoners observed that he had numerous reddened areas, which were thought to be age-related shingles. Such redness can, of course, also indicate other illnesses or poisoning. Boehm was even temporarily allowed to leave the infirmary because his infection had improved. After a few days, however, his condition worsened again, which is why he was transferred back to the infirmary, where he then died. There are numerous reports that many human experiments with typhus and other diseases took place in concentration camps in order to test vaccines. The symptoms of typhus are quite similar to those of shingles. However, unlike shingles, typhus infection is considered fatal. Dachau is one of the concentration camps where medical experiments were carried out in which prisoners were deliberately infected with typhus, other lethal organisms, and poisons.

== Effect to the present ==
Franz Boehm is considered one of the bravest pastors of the Archdiocese of Cologne during the National Socialist era. In Monheim am Rhein, on the street named after him, a Stolperstein in front of the staircase to St. Gereon commemorates Boehm – another one is in front of the rectory of St. Katharina in Düsseldorf. In Düsseldorf, a Catholic elementary school was renamed Franz-Boehm-Schule in 2002. In Monheim and Sieglar, streets and parish centers are named after Franz Boehm. In 2020 a memorial place was inaugurated in Monheim in honor of the unforgotten parish priest.

In 1999, the Catholic Church included parish priest Franz Boehm as a witness of faith in the German Martyrology of the 20th Century. There is a memorial plaque for Franz Boehm at St. Martin's Church in Boleszyn and an exhibition on his life and act in the St. Geron's Church in Monheim. In the touring exhibition "Martyrs of the Archdiocese of Cologne from the National Socialist Era", which has been showing the educational work of the Archdiocese of Cologne at various locations since 2006, Franz Boehm has a prominent position. In 2010, Catholics from the parish in Monheim submitted a petition to the Archdiocese of Cologne to initiate a beatification process for Boehm. As a contemporary witness, the historian of philosophy Karl Bormann reported about Boehm that he was "helpful, deeply religious, conscientious, strict and uncompromising". According to the Book of Isaiah, Boehm didn't want to belong to the "mute dogs" (Is 56:10).

== Bibliography ==
- Baumslag, Naomi (2005). Murderous Medicine: Nazi Doctors, Human Experimentation, and Typhus. Westport, Connecticut: Praeger. ISBN 978-0-275-98312-3. OCLC 1123873153.
- Buter, Peter (2020). Franz Boehm 1880–1945: sein Leben, sein pastorales und kreativ-sozialpolitisches Wirken, sein Widerstand und seine Verfolgung im Dritten Reich (2nd ed.). Monheim: St. Gereon und Dionysius. ISBN 978-3-00-066621-6. OCLC 1248720309.
- Hoffmann, Bedšrich (1994). And Who Will Kill You: The Chronicle of the Life and Sufferings of Priests in the Concentration Camps (4th ed.). Poznan: Pallottinum. ISBN 978-83-7014-223-0. OCLC 34266017.
- Mata, Santiago (2022). Mártires cristianos bajo el nazismo: La persecución de Hitler y la resistencia de los cristianos. Córdoba: Sekotia. ISBN 978-84-11310-83-3. OCLC 1350842391.
- Moll, Helmut (1998). "Wenn wir heute nicht unser Leben einsetzen ...". Martyrer des Erbistums Köln aus der Zeit des Nationalsozialismus. Cologne: Bildungswerk. ISBN 978-3931739-09-6. OCLC 1070875799.
- Moll, Helmut (2019). Zeugen für Christus. Das deutsche Martyrologium des 20. Jahrhunderts. Vol. 1 (7th ed.). Paderborn: Ferdinand Schöningh. ISBN 978-3-506-78012-6. OCLC 1158014898.
- Tribunals, Nuernberg Military (1949). Trials of war criminals before the Nuernberg military tribunals under Control Council law no. 10. Vol. 1. Washington, D.C.: U.S. Government Printing Office. OCLC 61644081.
- von Hehl, Ulrich (1984). Priester unter Hitlers Terror. Mainz: Matthias-Grünewald. ISBN 978-3506798398. OCLC 242613370.
