= Rygiel =

Rygiel may refer to:

- Rygiel, Warmian-Masurian Voivodeship, Gmina Kurzętnik, Nowe Miasto County, Warmian-Masurian Voivodeship, Poland

== People with the surname ==
- Jim Rygiel (born 1955), Polish-American visual effects supervisor
- Marcin Rygiel (born 1983), Polish musician

== See also ==
- Rigel
