= Szafarnia, Warmian-Masurian Voivodeship =

Szafarnia
- Village
- Location within Poland
- Coordinates: 53°22′N 19°28′E
- Country: Poland
- Voivodeship: Warmian-Masurian
- County: Nowe Miasto
- Gmina: Kurzętnik

Szafarnia [ʂaˈfarɲa] is a village in the administrative district of Gmina Kurzętnik, within Nowe Miasto County, Warmian-Masurian Voivodeship, in northern Poland.
