= Wawrowice, Warmian-Masurian Voivodeship =

Wawrowice
- Village
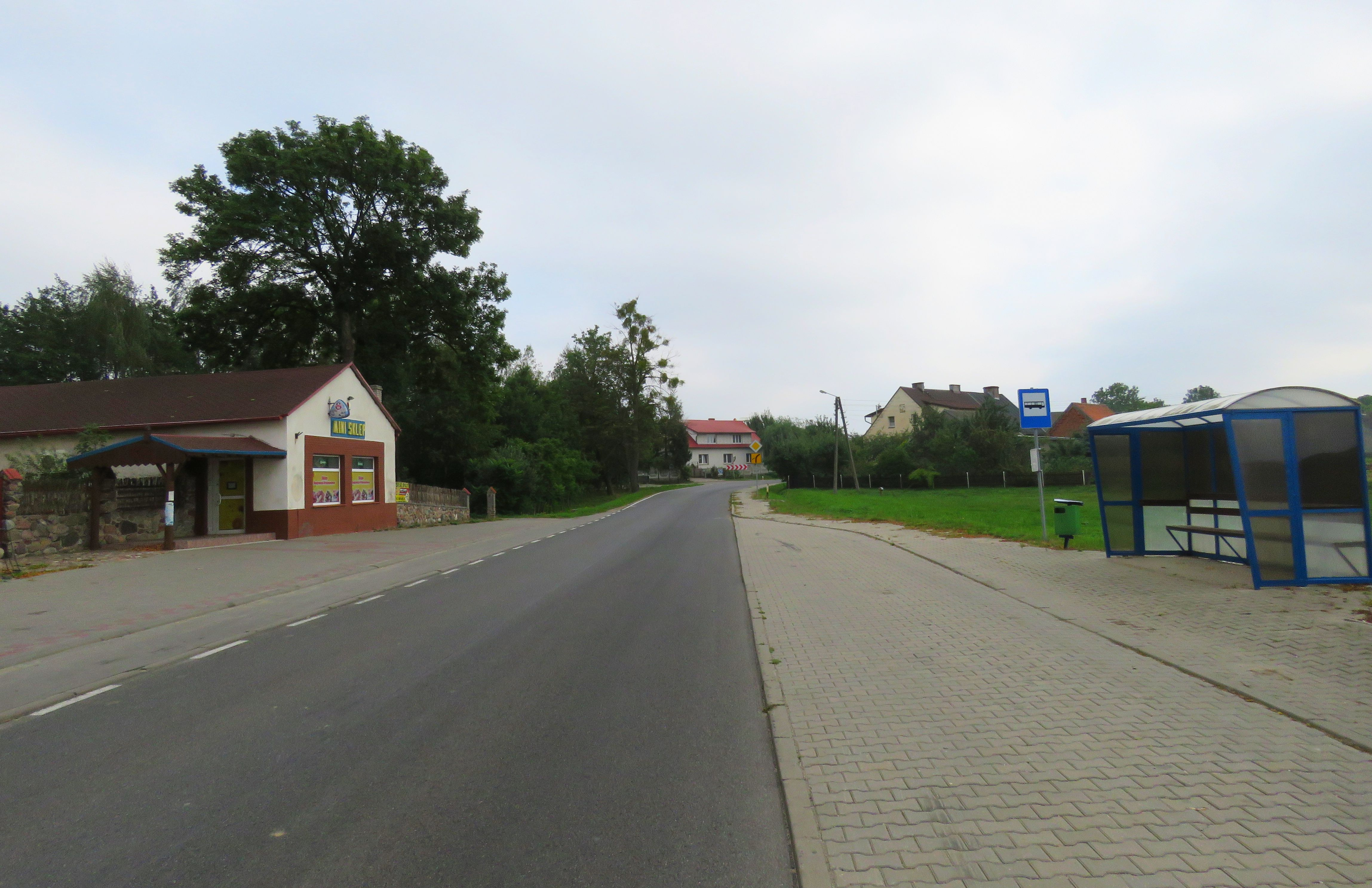

- Location within Poland
- Coordinates: 53°27′N 19°28′E
- Country: Poland
- Voivodeship: Warmian-Masurian
- County: Nowe Miasto
- Gmina: Kurzętnik
- Elevation: 198 m (650 ft)

Wawrowice [vavrɔˈvit͡sɛ] is a village in the administrative district of Gmina Kurzętnik, within Nowe Miasto County, Warmian-Masurian Voivodeship, in northern Poland.
