= Kamionka, Nowe Miasto County =

Kamionka
- Village
- Location within Poland
- Coordinates: 53°25′N 19°31′E
- Country: Poland
- Voivodeship: Warmian-Masurian
- County: Nowe Miasto
- Gmina: Kurzętnik

Kamionka [kaˈmjɔnka] is a village in the administrative district of Gmina Kurzętnik, within Nowe Miasto County, Warmian-Masurian Voivodeship, in northern Poland.
