= Tereszewo =

- Village
- Location within Poland
- Coordinates: 53°23′N 19°28′E
- Country: Poland
- Voivodeship: Warmian-Masurian
- County: Nowe Miasto
- Gmina: Kurzętnik
- Highest elevation: 140 m (460 ft)
- Lowest elevation: 100 m (330 ft)
- Population: 783

Tereszewo [tɛrɛˈʂɛvɔ] is a village in the administrative district of Gmina Kurzętnik, within Nowe Miasto County, Warmian-Masurian Voivodeship, in northern Poland.
