= Ostaszewo, Warmian-Masurian Voivodeship =

Ostaszewo
- Village
- Location within Poland
- Coordinates: 53°23′N 19°49′E
- Country: Poland
- Voivodeship: Warmian-Masurian
- County: Nowe Miasto
- Gmina: Grodziczno

Ostaszewo [ɔstaˈʂɛvɔ] is a village in the administrative district of Gmina Grodziczno, within Nowe Miasto County, Warmian-Masurian Voivodeship, in northern Poland.
