= Mikołajki, Nowe Miasto County =

Mikołajki
- Village
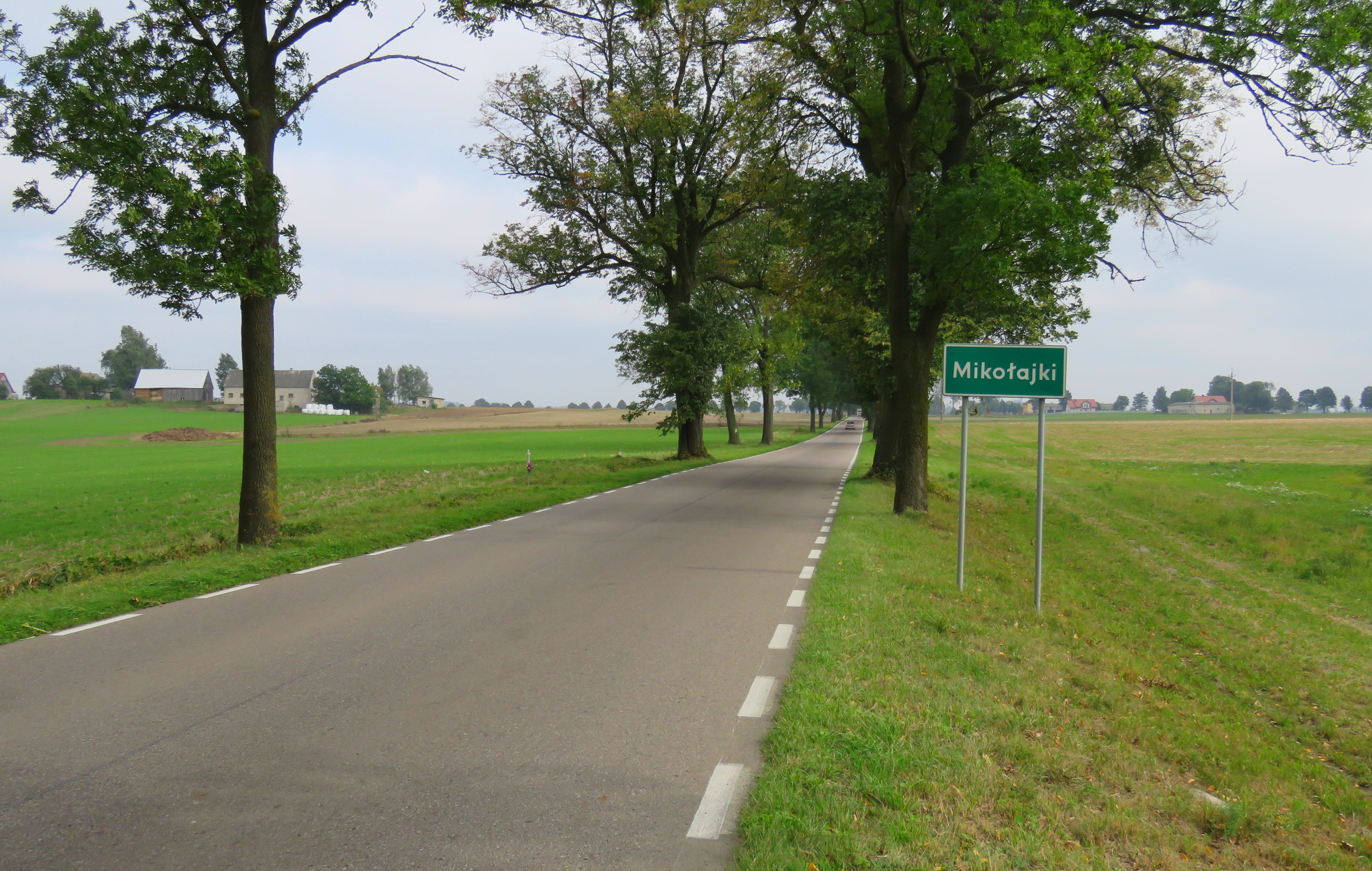

- Location within Poland
- Coordinates: 53°27′N 19°31′E
- Country: Poland
- Voivodeship: Warmian-Masurian
- County: Nowe Miasto
- Gmina: Kurzętnik

Mikołajki [mikɔˈwai̯ki] is a village in the administrative district of Gmina Kurzętnik, within Nowe Miasto County, Warmian-Masurian Voivodeship, in northern Poland.
