= Wielki Głęboczek =

- Village
- Location within Poland
- Coordinates: 53°20′N 19°33′E
- Country: Poland
- Voivodeship: Kuyavian-Pomeranian
- County: Brodnica
- Gmina: Brzozie

Wielki Głęboczek (Polish pronunciation: [ˈvjɛlkʲi ɡwɛmˈbɔtʂɛk]) is a village in the administrative district of Gmina Brzozie, within Brodnica County, Kuyavian-Pomeranian Voivodeship, in north-central Poland.
