= Lipowiec, Nowe Miasto County =

Lipowiec
- Village
- Location within Poland
- Coordinates: 53°23′55″N 19°32′13″E
- Country: Poland
- Voivodeship: Warmian-Masurian
- County: Nowe Miasto
- Gmina: Kurzętnik

Lipowiec [liˈpɔvjɛt͡s] is a village in the administrative district of Gmina Kurzętnik, within Nowe Miasto County, Warmian-Masurian Voivodeship, in northern Poland.
