= Kurzętnik =

- Village
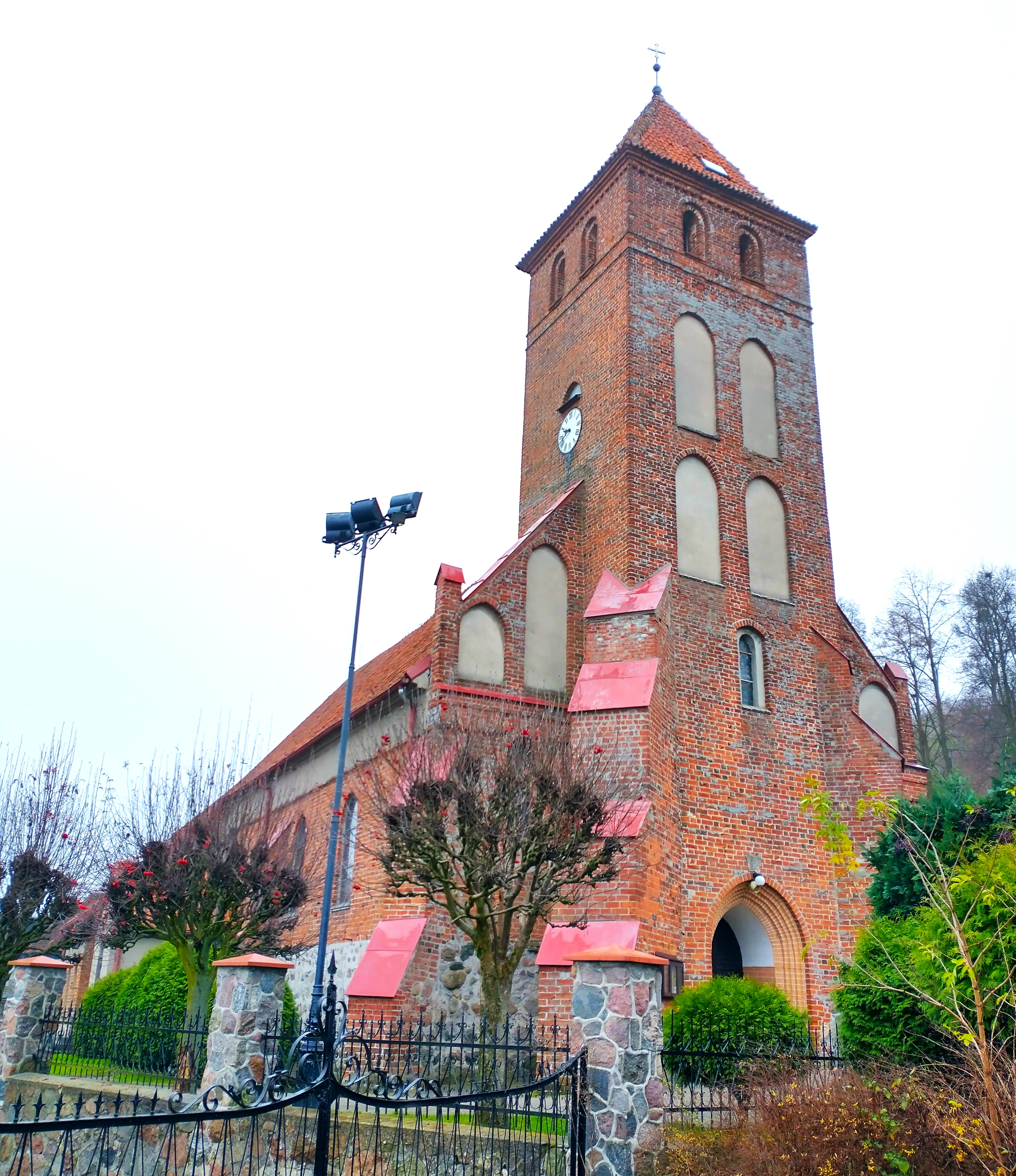
- Saint Mary Magdalene church in Kurzętnik

- Location within Poland
- Coordinates: 53°23′57″N 19°34′37″E
- Country: Poland
- Voivodeship: Warmian-Masurian
- County: Nowe Miasto
- Gmina: Kurzętnik
- Town rights: 1330
- Town rights revoked: 1905

Population
  - Total: 3,065
- Time zone: UTC+1 (CET)
  - Summer (DST): UTC+2 (CEST)
- Vehicle registration: NNM
- Website: http://bip.warmia.mazury.pl/kurzetnik_gmina_wiejska/

Kurzętnik [kuˈʐɛntnik] is a village in Nowe Miasto County, Warmian-Masurian Voivodeship, in northern Poland. It is the seat of the gmina (administrative district) called Gmina Kurzętnik.

During the Hunger War of 1414, the town was captured by Poles led by Jakusz Świętański and Jan Dóbrski.

Kurzętnik was a private church town, administratively located in the Chełmno Voivodeship in the Kingdom of Poland.

In 1896 Erich Dieckmann, furniture designer of the Bauhaus was born here.
