= Mroczenko =

- Village
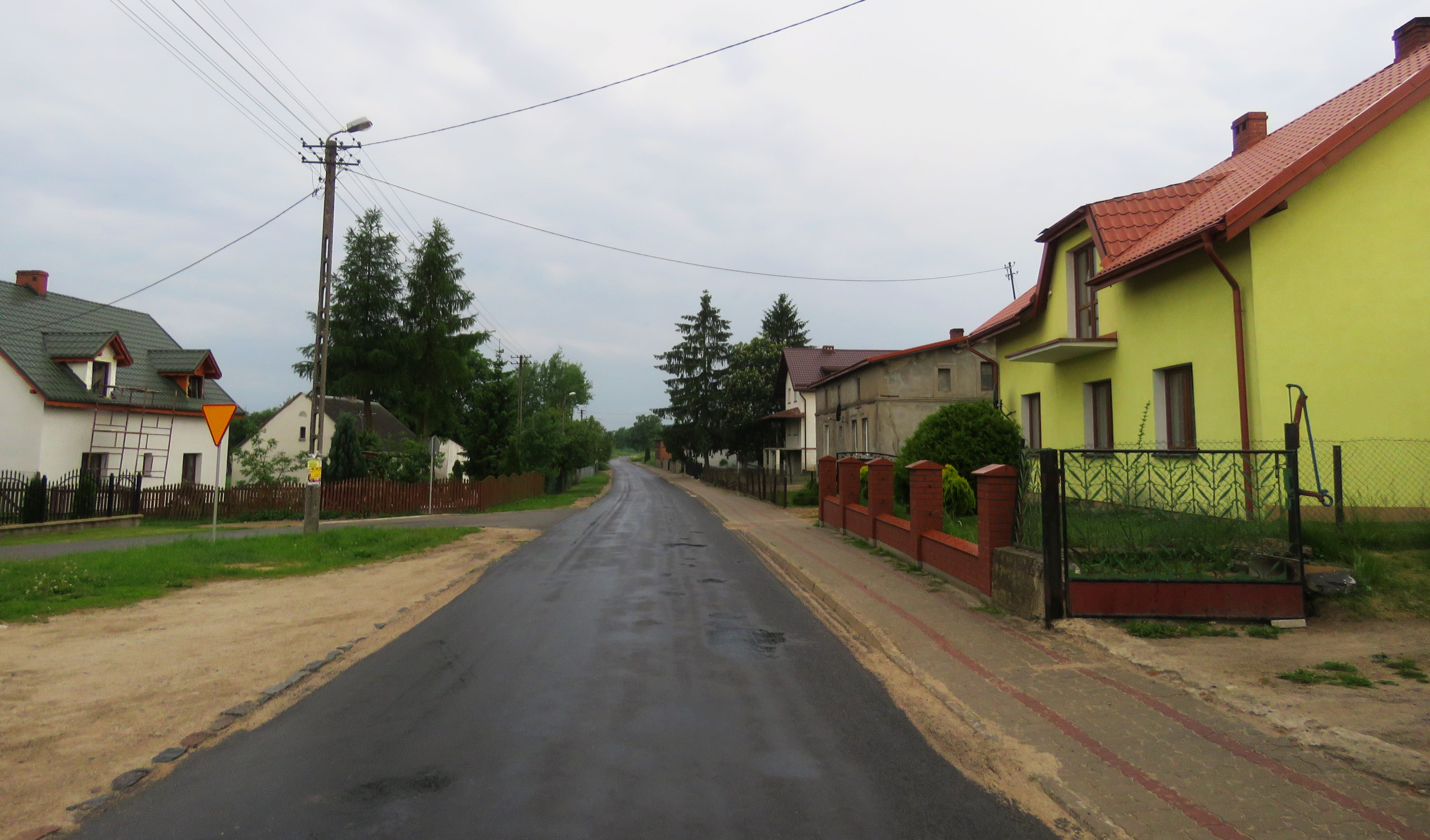

- Location within Poland
- Coordinates: 53°23′09″N 19°42′16″E
- Country: Poland
- Voivodeship: Warmian-Masurian
- County: Nowe Miasto
- Gmina: Grodziczno
- Time zone: UTC+1 (CET)
  - Summer (DST): UTC+2 (CEST)
- Vehicle registration: NNM

Mroczenko [mrɔˈt͡ʂɛnkɔ] is a village in the administrative district of Gmina Grodziczno, within Nowe Miasto County, Warmian-Masurian Voivodeship, in northern Poland.

Two Polish citizens were murdered by Nazi Germany in the village during World War II.
