= Karl Bormann =

German philosopher (1928–2015)

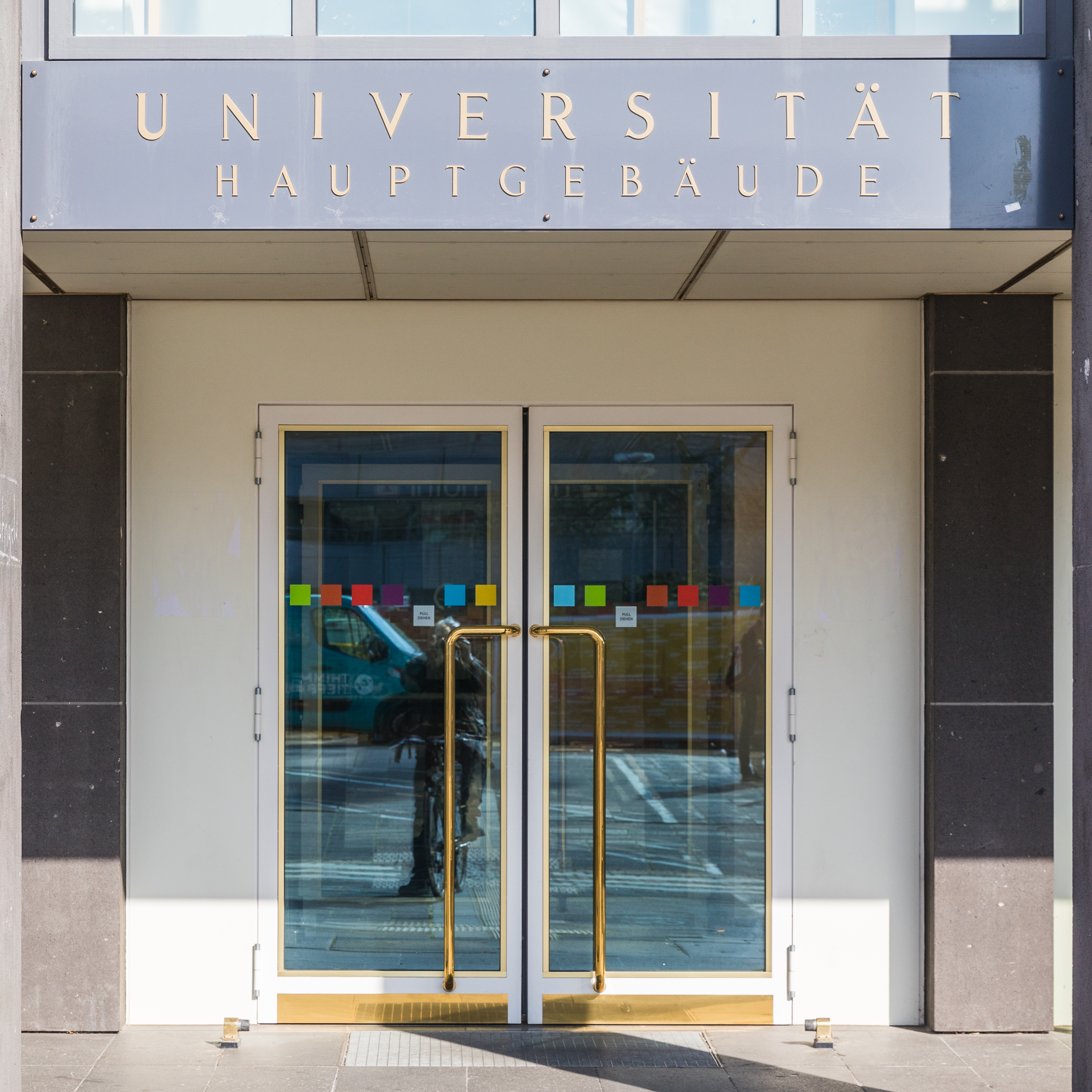
- Door to the Faculty of Philosophy
- Born: 23 November 1928; Monheim am Rhein, Weimar Republic
- Died: 17 August 2015 (aged 86); Langenfeld, Federal Republic of Germany

Education
- Education: Municipal Hölderlin-Gymnasium Cologne; Studies and doctorate of classical philology and philosophy at University of Cologne (1949-1954) (PhD 1955; Dr. phil. hab. 1967)

Philosophical work
- Era: 20th-century philosophy
- Region: Western philosophy
- School: Continental philosophy Hermeneutics; Neoplatonism; Platonism; Stoicism; Christian humanism (Nicholas of Cusa)
- Institutions: University of Cologne; Thomas-Institut
- Main interests: Greek philosophy, Nicholas of Cusa, Pre-Socratic philosophy, Platon, Aristoteles, Stoa, Thomas Aquinas

Karl Bormann (November 23, 1928 in Monheim, – August 17, 2015 in Langenfeld) was a German historian of philosophy. His area of research was ancient and medieval philosophy, in particular the work of Cardinal Nicholas of Cusa.

== Biography ==
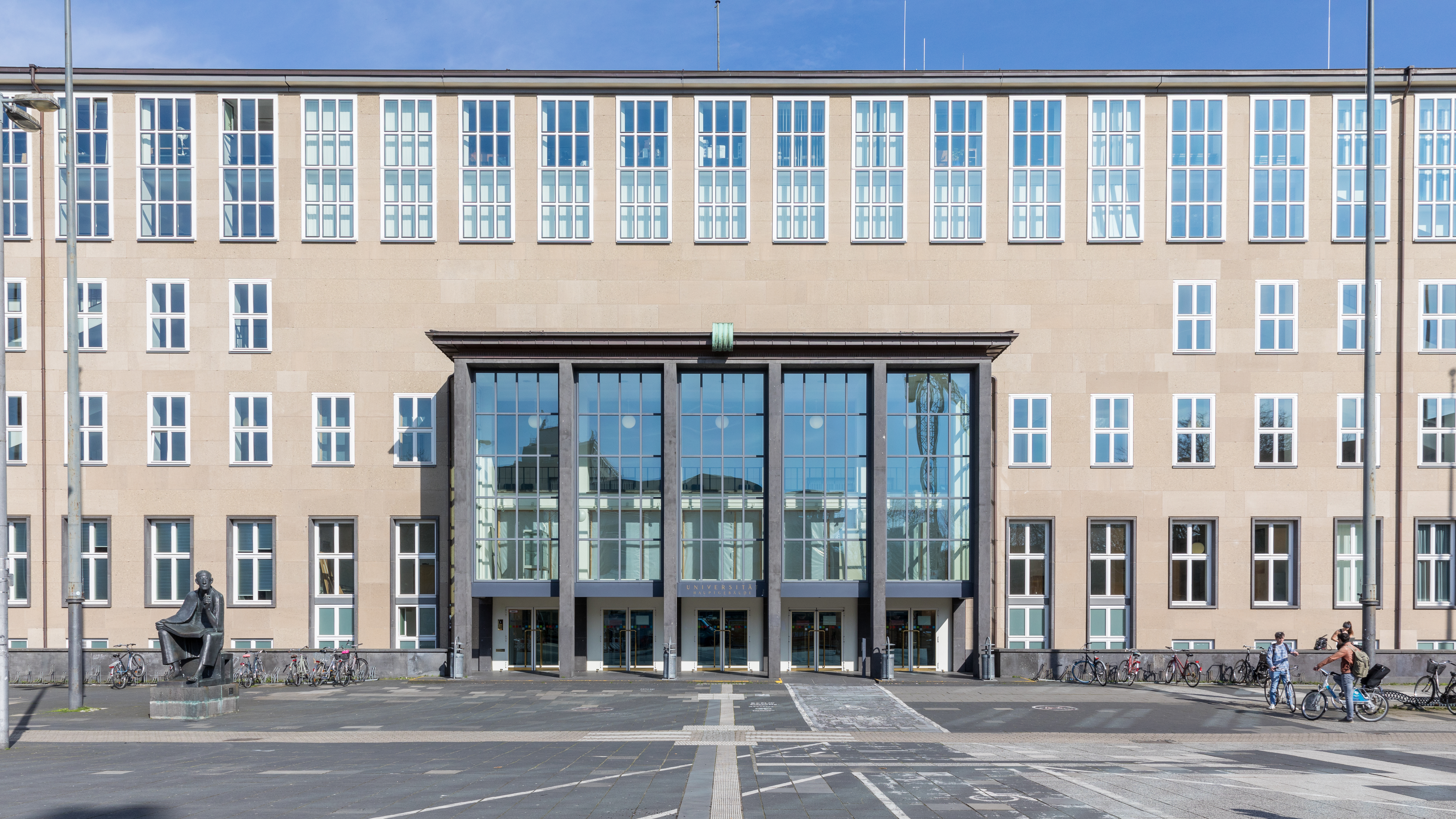
Main building of the University of Cologne (Albertus-Magnus-Platz)

Bormann spent his entire scientific career at the University of Cologne. After graduating from the state humanistic high school in Cologne-Mülheim in 1949, he studied classical philology and philosophy with the professors Josef Koch, Günther Jachmann and Josef Kroll and received his doctorate in 1955 with a dissertation on Philon's theory of ideas and logos, in which Bormann explained Philon's concept of the logos in critical examination of Harry Austryn Wolfson's interpretation.

From 1954 to 1959, Bormann was a research associate for Josef Koch at the Thomas-Institut of the University of Cologne, then until 1965 an assistant at Paul Wilpert's Philosophical Seminar. Funded by a habilitation grant from the German Research Foundation, he habilitated in 1967 with the work about the fragments of Parmenides. In 1970 he was first appointed adjunct professor and shortly thereafter appointed scientific advisor and professor. In 1980 he was appointed university professor of philosophy. Since 1985 he was a Member of International Center for Platonic and Aristotelian Studies. In 1994 he retired.

In 1967 Bormann became head of the Cologne office of the Cusanus Commission of the Heidelberg Academy of Sciences and Humanities, which oversees the edition and translation of the works of Nicholas of Kues. In 1970 he became a member of the Commission, in the same year a member of the Scientific Advisory Board of the Cusanus Society and in 1973 co-editor of the Cusanus Society's communications and research contributions. Since then, the Cusanus research and edition has been the focus of his scientific work. An introduction to Plato's life and work, which was published several times, was also widely distributed. Characteristic of Bormann's work is the sober and fact-oriented manner of presentation based on a thorough and precise, philologically sound text analysis, while avoiding extensive philosophical speculations.

Bormann supported efforts to open a beatification process on diocesan level for the Monheim martyr priest Franz Boehm, who was deported to the Dachau concentration camp because of his resistance to the Nazi regime, where he died in February 1945. As a former altar server for Boehm, Bormann was able to describe his personality from his own experience. He valued most about Boehm was that he was "helpful, deeply religious, conscientious, strict and uncompromising".

== Writings (selection) as author ==
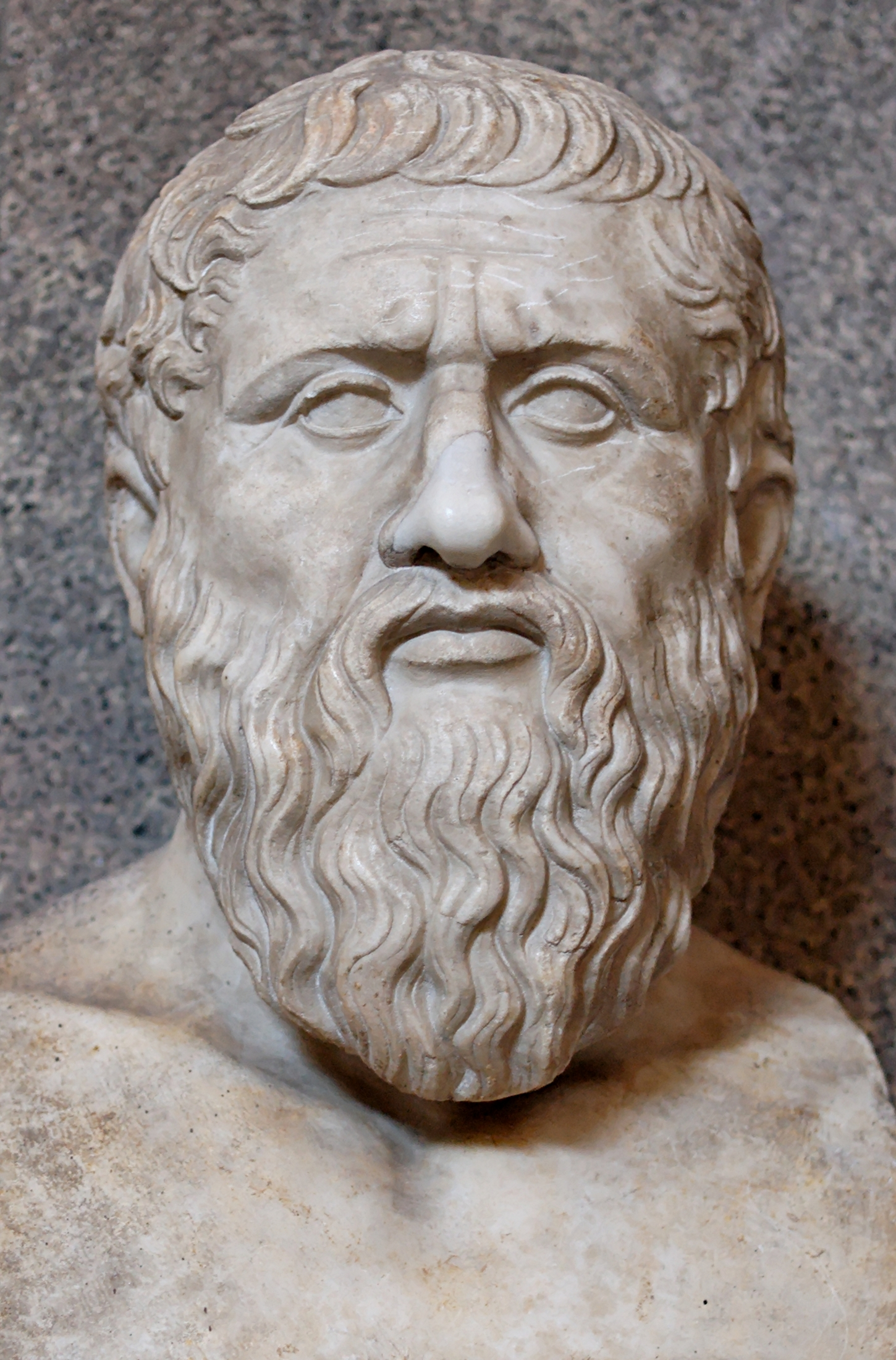
Platon bust (Museo Pio-Clementino)

- Die Ideen- und Logoslehre Philons von Alexandrien. Eine Auseinandersetzung mit H. A. Wolfson. Köln 1955 (Dissertation).
- Parmenides. Untersuchungen zu den Fragmenten. Meiner, Hamburg 1971 (Habilitation).
- Platon. Alber, Freiburg im Breisgau 1973; new 4th Edition 2003, ISBN 3-495-48094-3.
- The Interpretation of Parmenides by the Neoplatonist Simplicius. In: The Monist. 62. 1979, pp. 30-42.
- “Omne ens est bonum”: ethical character and social responsibility. In: Du Vrai, du Beau, du Bien. Études philosophiques presentées à Évanghelos Moutsopoulos. Paris 1990, pp. 228-249.
- Is there a unity of contemporary society? In: Energeia. Études aristotéliciennes offertes à Mgr. Antonio Jannone. Paris 1986, pp. 387-400. (Centre international d’études platoniciennes et aristotéliciennes, Publications – series “Recherches”, No. 1)

== Writings (selection) as editor and translator ==
- Nikolaus von Kues: Philosophisch-theologische Werke. Lateinisch-deutsch. Volume III, De beryllo, Meiner, Hamburg 2002, ISBN 978-3-7873-1624-3
- Platon: Der Staat. Über das Gerechte. Translated and explained by Otto Apelt. Revised and annotated by Karl Bormann. Introduction by Paul Wilpert. 8th Edition, Meiner, Hamburg 1961 (Philosophische Bibliothek 80), ISBN 978-3-7873-0930-6
- Philon von Alexandria: Über die Freiheit des Tüchtigen. Über das betrachtende Leben. Über die Unvergänglichkeit der Welt. (Translations). In: Philo von Alexandria: Die Werke in deutscher Übersetzung. Band VII, de Gruyter, Berlin 1964.
- Nikolaus von Kues: Nicolai de Cusa opera omnia. Iussu et auctoritate Academiae Litterarum Heidelbergensis ad codicum fidem edita. (Historical-critical complete edition of the Heidelberg Academy), Meiner, Hamburg
  - Vol. 3: De coniecturis, 1972, ISBN 978-3-7873-0218-5
  - Vol. 10: Opuscula II; Fasc. 2a, 1994, ISBN 978-3-7873-1075-3
  - Vol. 10: Opuscula II; Fasc. 2b, 1988, ISBN 978-3-7873-0750-0
  - Vol. 11/1: De beryllo, 1988, ISBN 978-3-7873-0749-4
  - Vol. 11/3: Compendium, 1964, ISBN 978-3-7873-0192-8
- Nikolaus von Kues: Schriften des Nikolaus von Kues in deutscher Übersetzung. Meiner, Hamburg.
  - Issue 2: Über den Beryll: Lateinisch–deutsch. 1976, 4th Edition 2002 (Philosophische Bibliothek 295), ISBN 978-3-7873-1608-3
  - Issue 16: Kompendium. Kurze Darstellung der philosophisch-theologischen Lehren. 4th Edition 1996 (Philosophische Bibliothek 267), ISBN 978-3-7873-1190-3
  - Issue 23: Tu quis es (De principio). Über den Ursprung. new Edition 2001 (Philosophische Bibliothek 487), ISBN 978-3-7873-1271-9
  - Issue 24: De venatione sapientiae. Die Jagd nach Weisheit. new Edition 2003 (Philosophische Bibliothek 549), ISBN 3-7873-1626-4
- Expositio in Parmenidem Platonis. Winter, Heidelberg 1986 (Abhandlungen der Heidelberger Akademie der Wissenschaften, Philosophisch-Historische Klasse), ISBN 978-3-5330-3746-0

== Bibliography ==
- Ludwig Hagemann und Reinhold Glei (eds.): Hen kai Plethos – Einheit und Vielheit. Festschrift für Karl Bormann zum 65. Geburtstag (= Religionswissenschaftliche Studien. Vol. 30). Echter, Würzburg 1993, ISBN 3-429-01554-5.
- Kürschners Deutscher Gelehrten-Kalender. 21st Edition. K. G. Saur, München 2007.
- Walter Habel (ed.): Wer ist wer? (German version of Who's Who (UK)), Edition LII (2015-2016), Schmidt-Römhild, Lübeck 2015, ISBN 978-3-7950-2055-2, p. 104.
