= Kuligi, Warmian-Masurian Voivodeship =

Kuligi
- Village
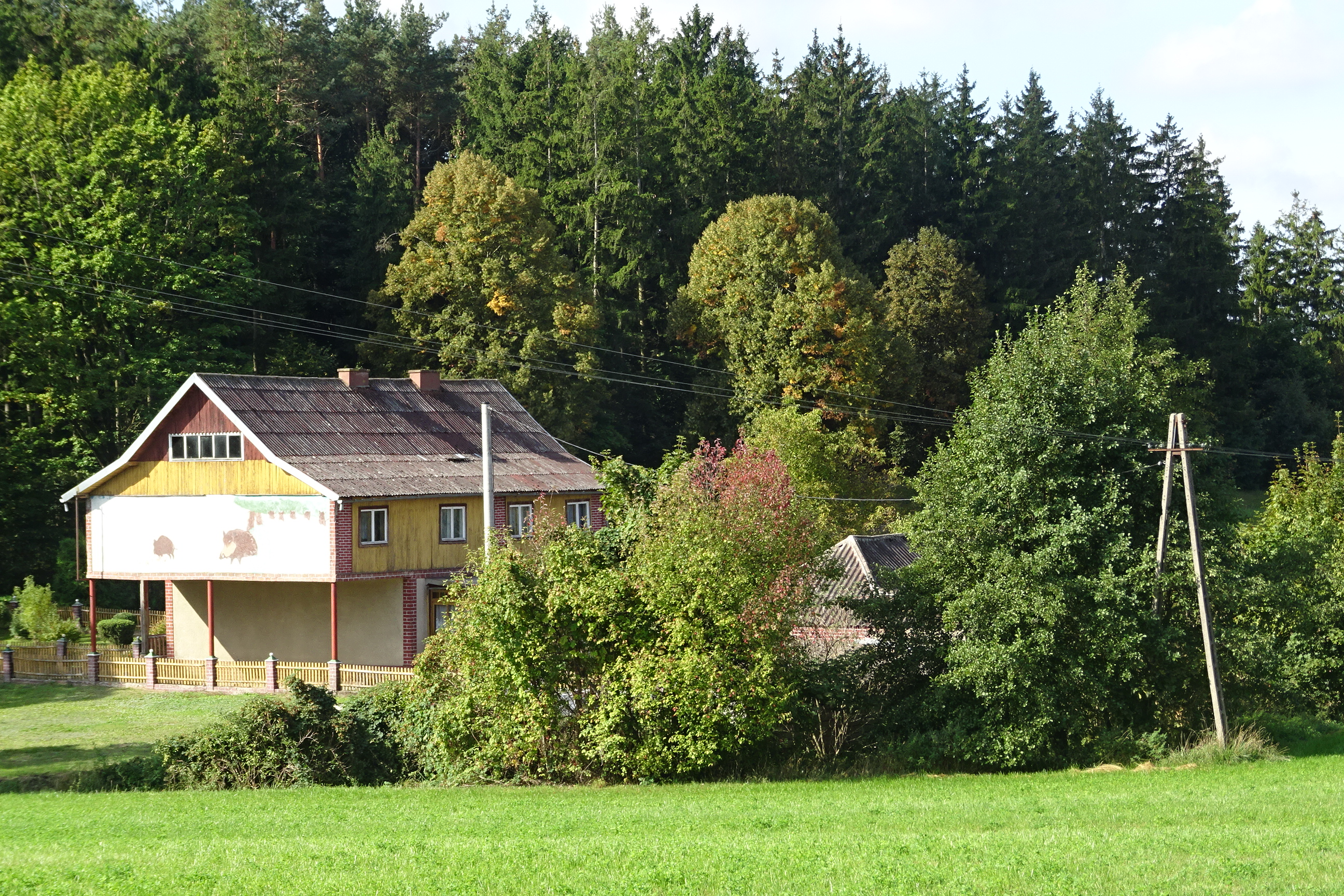

- Location within Poland
- Coordinates: 53°26′N 19°43′E
- Country: Poland
- Voivodeship: Warmian-Masurian
- County: Nowe Miasto
- Gmina: Grodziczno
- Time zone: UTC+1 (CET)
  - Summer (DST): UTC+2 (CEST)
- Postal code: 13-124
- Vehicle registration: NNM

Kuligi [kuˈliɡi] is a village in the administrative district of Gmina Grodziczno, within Nowe Miasto County, Warmian-Masurian Voivodeship, in northern Poland.

== History ==
Kuligi was administratively located in the Chełmno Voivodeship of the Kingdom of Poland. The village was previously recorded as Kullygy, Kullig, Kullingen (from 14.07.1908) and Kulingen (from 03.10.1908). It was annexed by Prussia in the First Partition of Poland in 1772. From 1773, it was part of the new province of West Prussia. Its population was mixed German and Polish. In 1905 it had a population of 165. From 1905 onwards, the village expanded with the arrival of a number of ethnic German farming families who were resettling from the Black Sea area of the Russian Empire. They built new houses, a Baptist chapel, Lutheran chapel and a post office close to the railway station at Seinskau. The Baptist chapel (now a shop) and the post office remain. By 1910 there were 324 inhabitants in the village.

On 20 January 1920 Kulingen was transferred back to Poland, after the country regained independence following World War I. German inhabitants were given the option of taking Polish nationality, or selling up and leaving for Germany. A large proportion chose the latter option.

Following the German-Soviet invasion of Poland, which started World War II in September 1939, it was occupied by Germany under its Germanized name Kulingen, as part of the Landkreis Löbau (from 1940 Landkreis Neumark).

On 18 January 1945 the order was given for all German inhabitants to evacuate to escape the approaching Soviet Red Army. Some Poles also joined the Germans on the "trek", which left on the morning of 19 January. The planned destination for the inhabitants was the still German-occupied Kościerzyna County, but the rapid approach of the Soviets meant that refugees headed further west or north instead. On 21 January 1945 the Soviets occupied the village, which was then restored to Poland.
