= Ostrówki, Warmian-Masurian Voivodeship =

Ostrówki
- Village
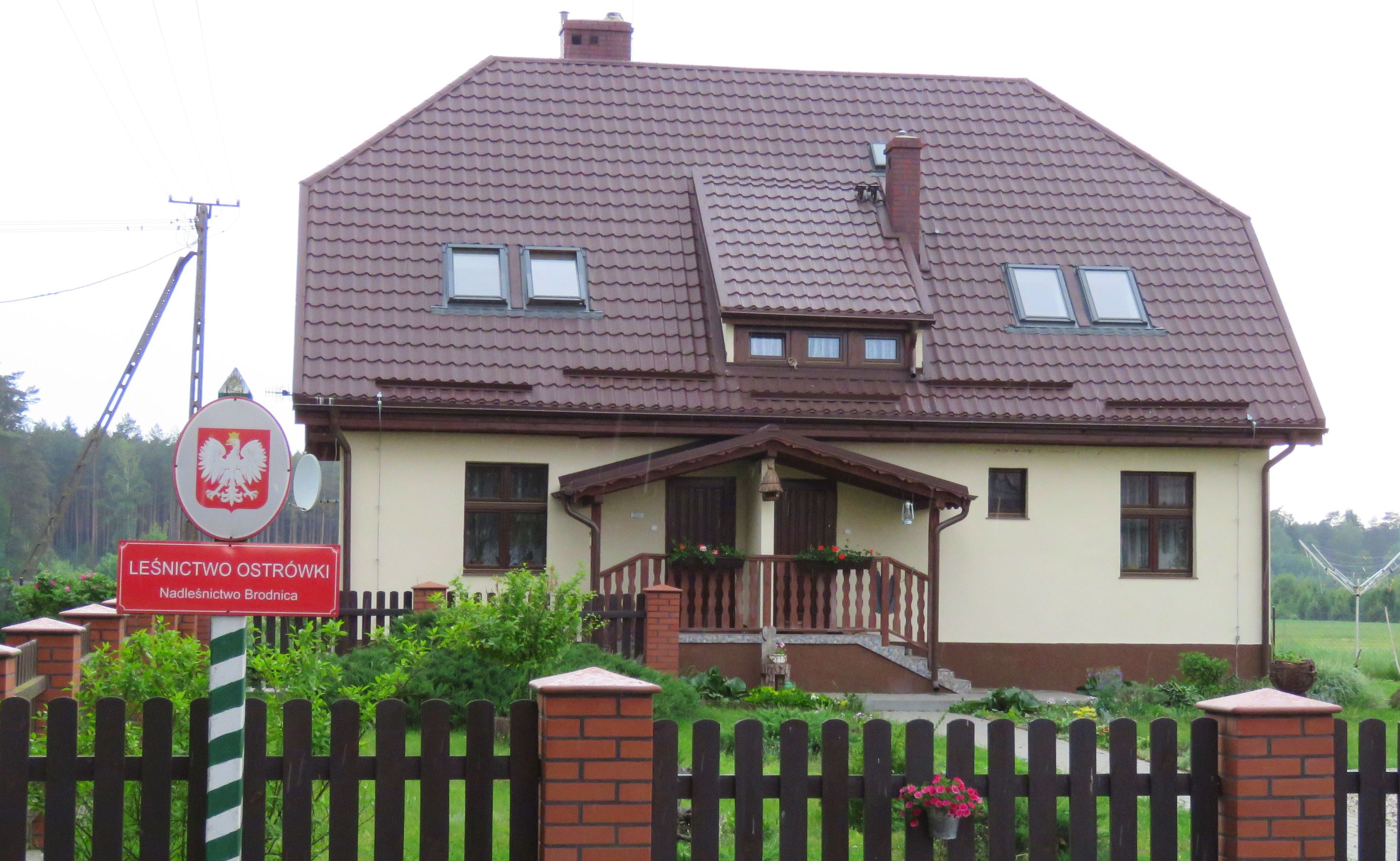

- Location within Poland
- Coordinates: 53°23′06″N 19°28′04″E
- Country: Poland
- Voivodeship: Warmian-Masurian
- County: Nowe Miasto
- Gmina: Kurzętnik

Ostrówki [ɔsˈtrufki] is a village in the administrative district of Gmina Kurzętnik, within Nowe Miasto County, Warmian-Masurian Voivodeship, in northern Poland.
