= Gmina Kurzętnik =

Gmina Kurzętnik Kurzętnik Commune
- Gmina
- Coat of arms
- Interactive map of Gmina Kurzętnik
- Coordinates (Kurzętnik): 53°23′57″N 19°34′37″E
- Country: Poland
- Voivodeship: Warmian-Masurian
- County: Nowe Miasto
- Seat: Kurzętnik

Area
  - Total: 149.86 km^{2} (57.86 sq mi)

Population (2006)
  - Total: 8,646
  - Density: 57.69/km^{2} (149.4/sq mi)

Gmina Kurzętnik is a rural gmina (administrative district) in Nowe Miasto County, Warmian-Masurian Voivodeship, in northern Poland. Its seat is the village of Kurzętnik, which lies approximately 2 kilometres (1 mi) south of Nowe Miasto Lubawskie and 75 km (47 mi) south-west of the regional capital Olsztyn.

The gmina covers an area of 149.86 square kilometres (57.9 sq mi), and as of 2006 its total population is 8,646.

The gmina contains part of the protected area called Brodnica Landscape Park.

== Villages ==
Gmina Kurzętnik contains the villages and settlements of Bratuszewo, Brzozie Lubawskie, Kąciki, Kacze Bagno, Kamionka, Krzemieniewo, Kurzętnik, Lipowiec, Małe Bałówki, Marzęcice, Mikołajki, Nielbark, Ostrówki, Otręba, Rygiel, Sugajenko, Szafarnia, Tereszewo, Tomaszewo, Wawrowice and Wielkie Bałówki.

== Neighbouring gminas ==
Gmina Kurzętnik is bordered by the gminas of Bratian, Biskupiec, Brzozie, Grodziczno, and Zbiczno.
