= Linowiec, Warmian-Masurian Voivodeship =

Linowiec
- Village
- Location within Poland
- Coordinates: 53°26′N 19°45′E
- Country: Poland
- Voivodeship: Warmian-Masurian
- County: Nowe Miasto
- Gmina: Grodziczno

Linowiec [liˈnɔvjɛt͡s] is a village in the administrative district of Gmina Grodziczno, within Nowe Miasto County, Warmian-Masurian Voivodeship, in northern Poland.
