= Trzcin =

- Village
- Location within Poland
- Coordinates: 53°21′N 19°45′E
- Country: Poland
- Voivodeship: Warmian-Masurian
- County: Nowe Miasto
- Gmina: Grodziczno
- Population: 269

Trzcin [tʂt͡ɕin] is a village in the administrative district of Gmina Grodziczno, within Nowe Miasto County, Warmian-Masurian Voivodeship, in northern Poland.
