= Katlewo =

- Village
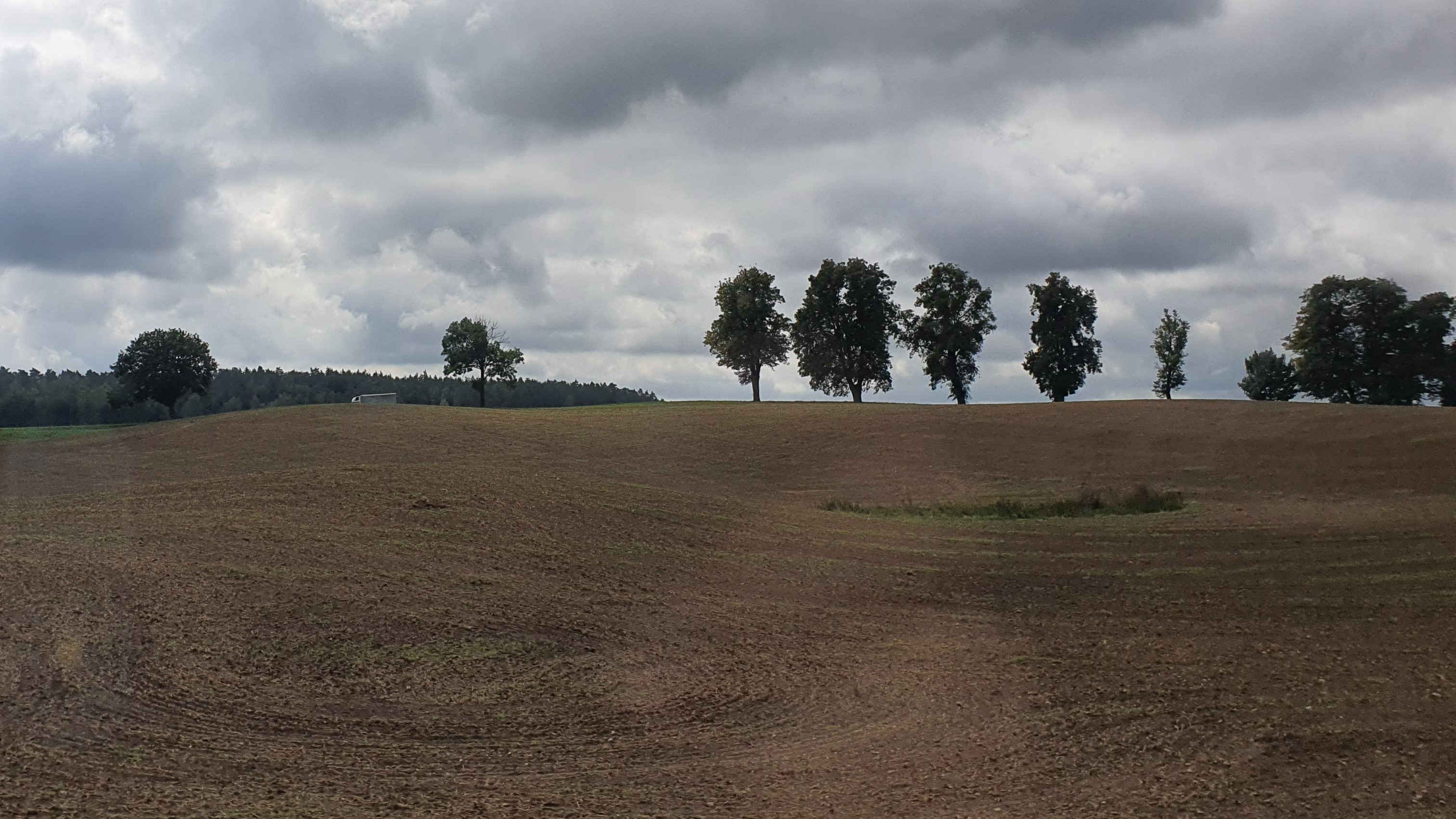

- Location within Poland
- Coordinates: 53°24′20″N 19°48′39″E
- Country: Poland
- Voivodeship: Warmian-Masurian
- County: Nowe Miasto
- Gmina: Grodziczno

Katlewo [kaˈtlɛvɔ] is a village in the administrative district of Gmina Grodziczno, within Nowe Miasto County, Warmian-Masurian Voivodeship, in northern Poland.

== Notable people ==
- Aleksy Antkiewicz, Polish Olympic boxer
