= Nowe Grodziczno =

- Village
- Location within Poland
- Coordinates: 53°24′11″N 19°45′36″E
- Country: Poland
- Voivodeship: Warmian-Masurian
- County: Nowe Miasto
- Gmina: Grodziczno

Nowe Grodziczno [ˈnɔvɛ ɡrɔˈd͡ʑit͡ʂnɔ] is a village in the administrative district of Gmina Grodziczno, within Nowe Miasto County, Warmian-Masurian Voivodeship, in northern Poland.
