= Białobłoty, Warmian-Masurian Voivodeship =

Białobłoty
- Village
- Location within Poland
- Coordinates: 53°25′10″N 19°48′46″E
- Country: Poland
- Voivodeship: Warmian-Masurian
- County: Nowe Miasto
- Gmina: Grodziczno

Białobłoty ([bjawɔˈbwɔtɨ]; translation: white swamps) is a village in the administrative district of Gmina Grodziczno, within Nowe Miasto County, Warmian-Masurian Voivodeship, in northern Poland.
