= Jajkowo =

- Village
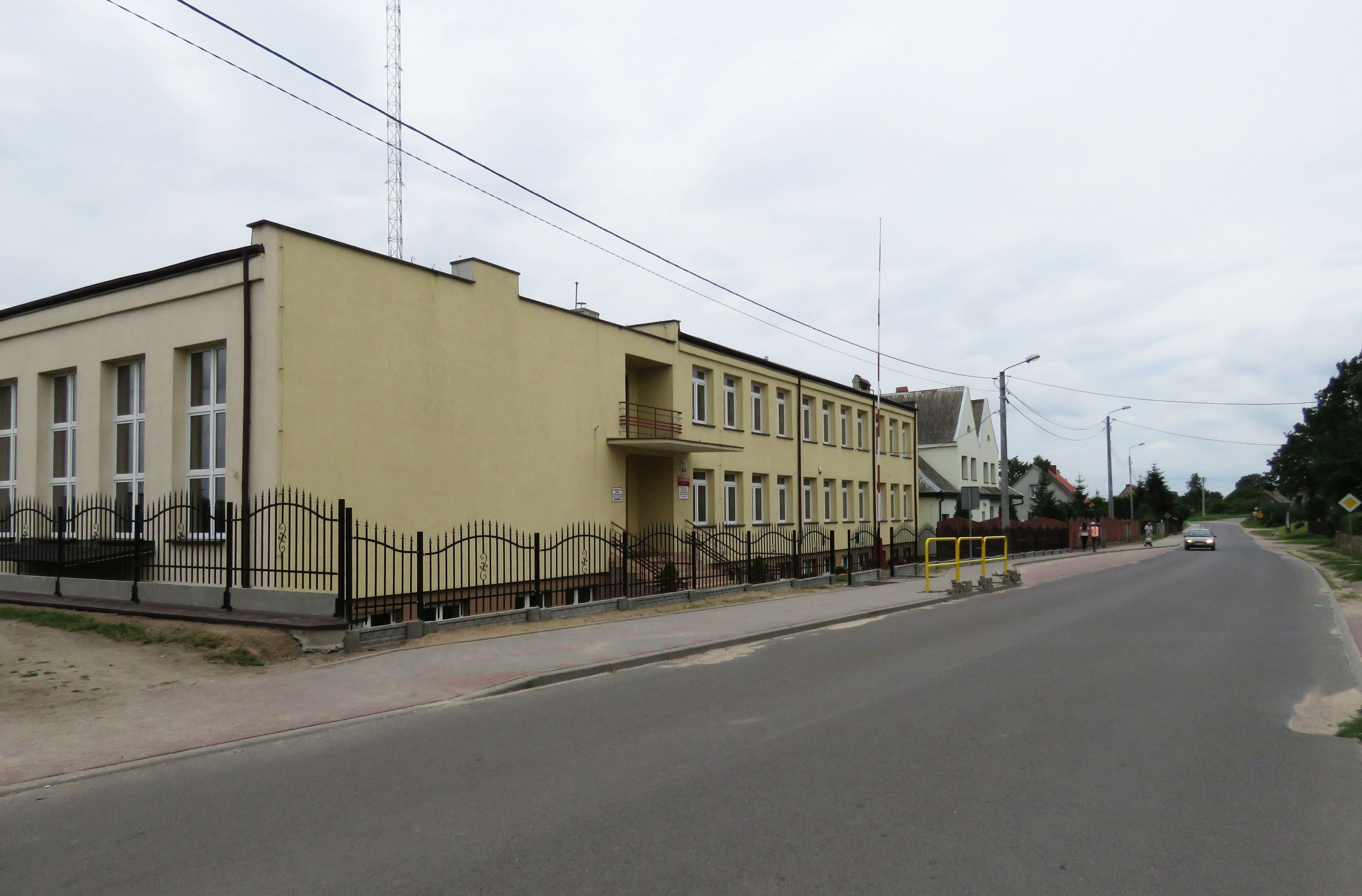
- Primary school in Jajkowo

- Location within Poland
- Coordinates: 53°19′N 19°30′E
- Country: Poland
- Voivodeship: Kuyavian-Pomeranian
- County: Brodnica
- Gmina: Brzozie
- Population: 600
- Time zone: UTC+1 (CET)
  - Summer (DST): UTC+2 (CEST)
- Vehicle registration: CBR

Jajkowo [jai̯ˈkɔvɔ] is a village in the administrative district of Gmina Brzozie, within Brodnica County, Kuyavian-Pomeranian Voivodeship, in north-central Poland. It is located in the Chełmno Land in the historic region of Pomerania.

== History ==
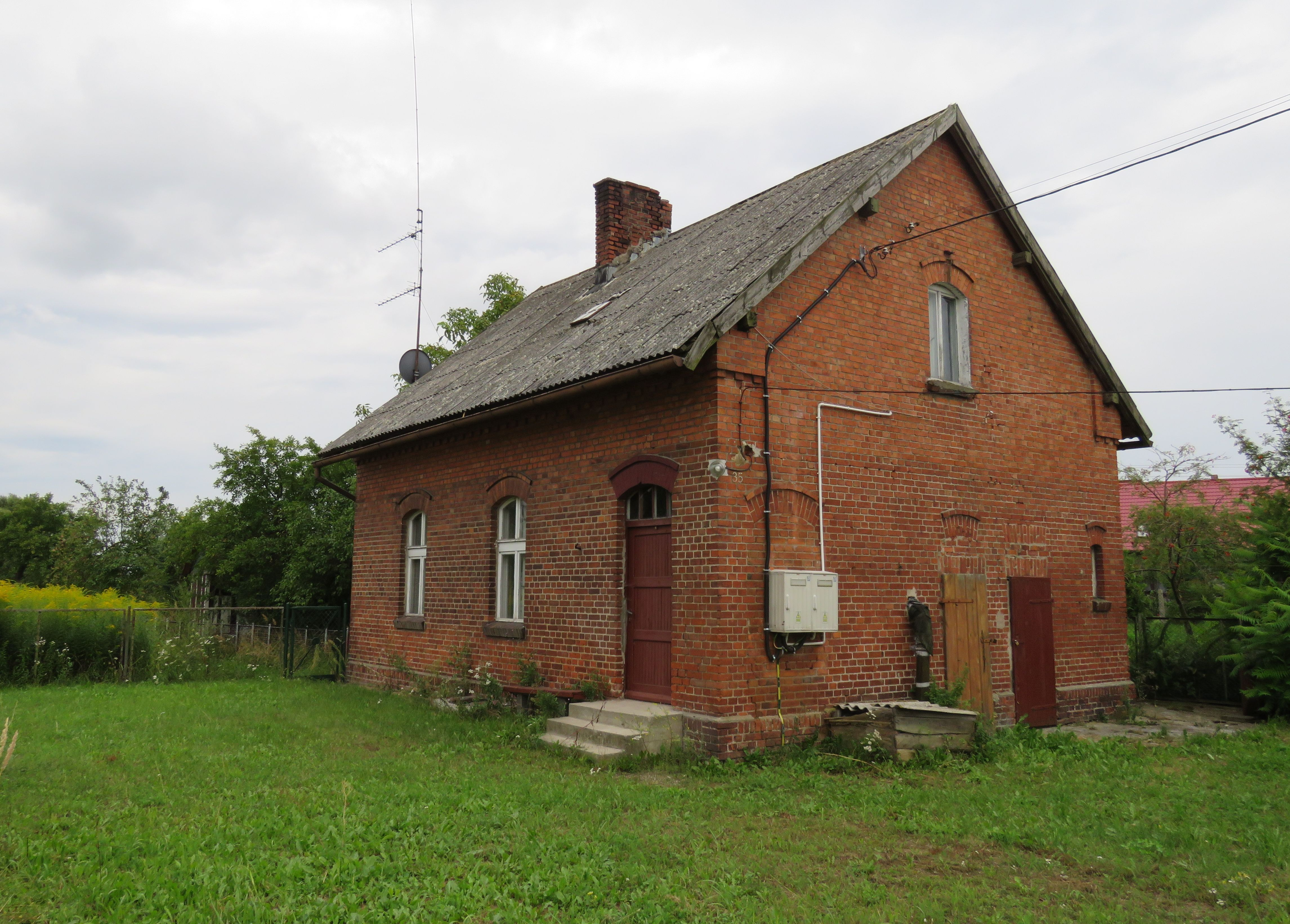
Old train station building

In the late 19th century the village had a predominantly Catholic population.

During the German occupation of Poland (World War II), the Germans established and operated three forced labour camps in the village (one for Polish men, one for Jewish women and one for Russian prisoners of war). Polish men aged 15–50 were deported from Wyrzysk and Nakło nad Notecią, while Jewish women were prisoners of the Stutthof concentration camp. There were terrible living and sanitary conditions in the camp for Poles, who lived in the attic above the pigsty, the basement of a burned castle, and a temporary barrack, built by them in the fall of 1944. Polish prisoners slept on straw at best, and the Germans gave one blanket for every two prisoners. Polish prisoners took baths in the lake or river, and in winter in cold water in cows' abreuvoirs or in snow. There was no medical care in the camp, and the most ill were transported to nearby Brodnica. Poles were beaten for minor offenses such as singing Polish songs, and the Germans set the death penalty for any escape attempts. The camp for Poles was guarded by the SA and Wehrmacht, and the camp for Jewish women was guarded by the SS and Wehrmacht, and Jewish women were subjected to even worse treatment than Poles. Polish prisoners wore "P" badges, and Jewish women wore yellow badges. Both Polish men and Jewish women worked at digging defensive trenches for German military purposes and were given the same meager meals. Both forced labour camps were disestablished in January 1945, and the prisoners were evacuated by the Germans. During the evacuation, Polish prisoners were forcibly conscripted to the Organisation Todt; however, some managed to escape. Jewish prisoners were marched towards Pruszcz Gdański despite winter conditions, and many died during the march. The forced labour camp for Russians was located at the train station.
