= Kacze Bagno =

- Settlement
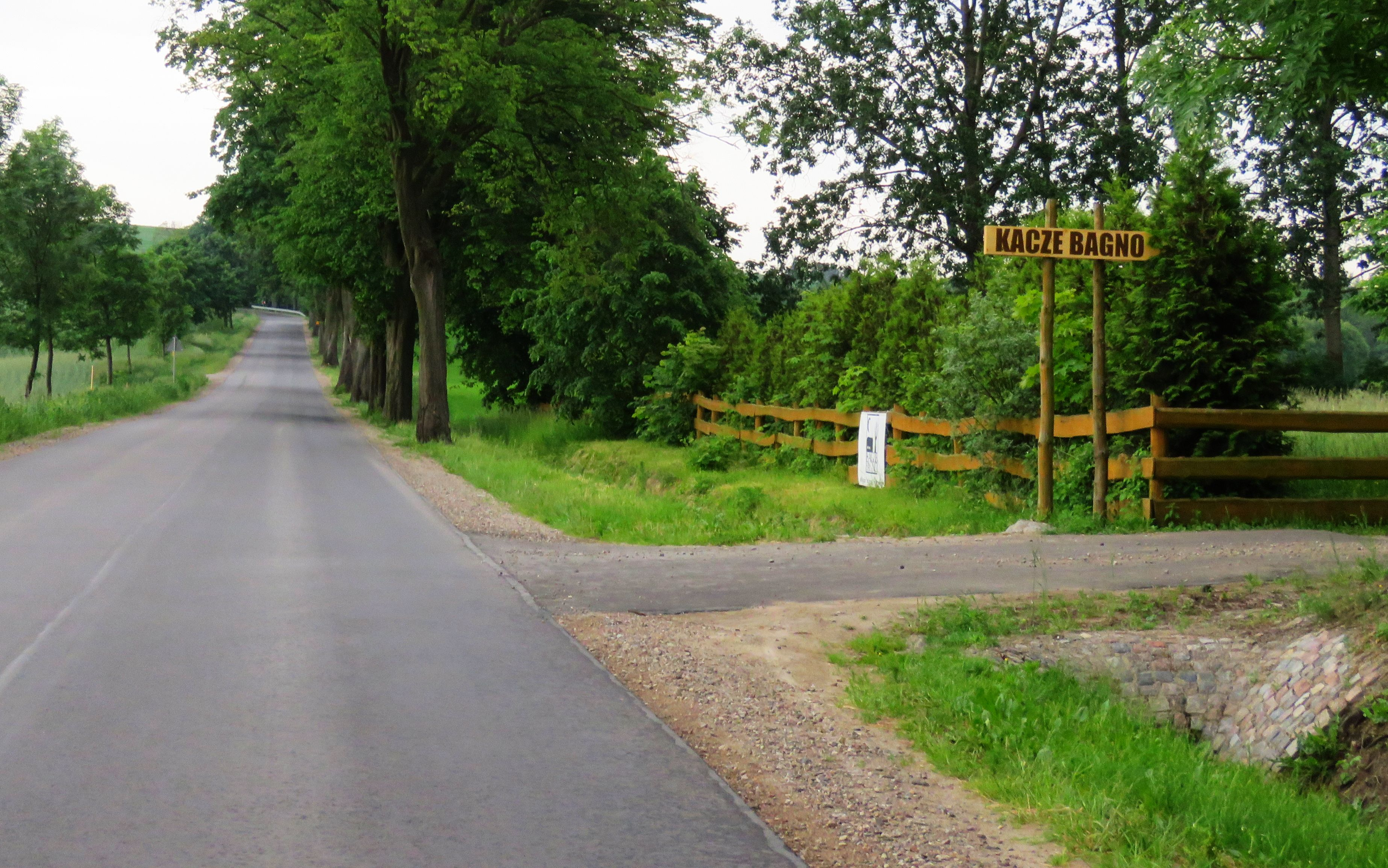

- Location within Poland
- Coordinates: 53°24′09″N 19°36′32″E
- Country: Poland
- Voivodeship: Warmian-Masurian
- County: Nowe Miasto
- Gmina: Kurzętnik

Kacze Bagno [ˈkat͡ʂɛ ˈbaɡnɔ] is a settlement in the administrative district of Gmina Kurzętnik, within Nowe Miasto County, Warmian-Masurian Voivodeship, in northern Poland.
