= Janówko, Kuyavian-Pomeranian Voivodeship =

Janówko
- Village
- Location within Poland
- Coordinates: 53°18′N 19°37′E
- Country: Poland
- Voivodeship: Kuyavian-Pomeranian
- County: Brodnica
- Gmina: Brzozie

Janówko [jaˈnufkɔ] is a village in the administrative district of Gmina Brzozie, within Brodnica County, Kuyavian-Pomeranian Voivodeship, in north-central Poland.
