= Grodziczno, Warmian-Masurian Voivodeship =

Grodziczno
- Village
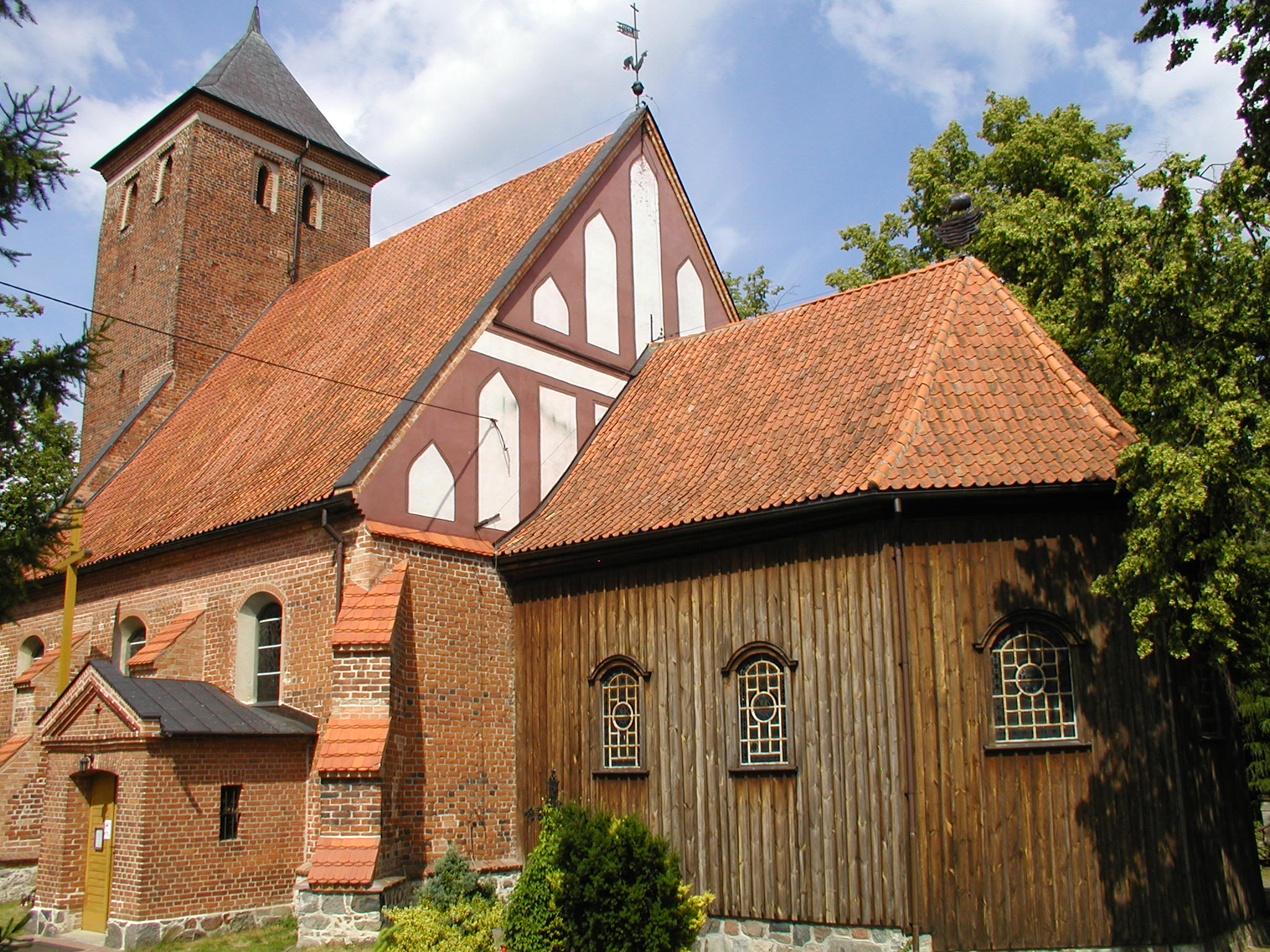
- Church of Saints Peter and Paul

- Location within Poland
- Coordinates: 53°24′47″N 19°45′39″E
- Country: Poland
- Voivodeship: Warmian-Masurian
- County: Nowe Miasto
- Gmina: Grodziczno

Population
  - Total: 890
- Time zone: UTC+1 (CET)
  - Summer (DST): UTC+2 (CEST)
- Vehicle registration: NNM

Grodziczno [ɡrɔˈd͡ʑit͡ʂnɔ] is a village in Nowe Miasto County, Warmian-Masurian Voivodeship, in northern Poland. It is the seat of the gmina (administrative district) called Gmina Grodziczno.

== History ==
The village was annexed by the Kingdom of Prussia in 1772 through the First Partition of Poland. Part of the Duchy of Warsaw (1807–13) during the Napoleonic Wars, the village was again annexed by the Kingdom of Prussia after the dissolution of the duchy, and from 1871 it was also part of the German Empire. It was one of the few villages in the German Empire to retain its Polish name. On 19 January 1920, following the Treaty of Versailles, the village was reintegrated with Poland which just regained independence following World War I.

During the German occupation of Poland (World War II), in 1940, the occupiers carried out expulsions of Poles from the village.
