= Rygiel, Warmian-Masurian Voivodeship =

Rygiel
- Settlement
- Location within Poland
- Coordinates: 53°23′30″N 19°35′45″E
- Country: Poland
- Voivodeship: Warmian-Masurian
- County: Nowe Miasto
- Gmina: Kurzętnik

Rygiel [ˈrɨɡʲɛl] is a settlement in the administrative district of Gmina Kurzętnik, within Nowe Miasto County in the Warmian-Masurian Voivodeship of northern Poland.
