= Gmina Grodziczno =

Gmina Grodziczno Grodziczno Commune
- Gmina
- Coat of arms
- Interactive map of Gmina Grodziczno
- Coordinates (Grodziczno): 53°24′47″N 19°45′39″E
- Country: Poland
- Voivodeship: Warmian-Masurian
- County: Nowe Miasto
- Seat: Grodziczno

Area
  - Total: 154.27 km^{2} (59.56 sq mi)

Population (2011)
  - Total: 6,392
  - Density: 41.43/km^{2} (107.3/sq mi)
- Website: http://www.grodziczno.pl/

Gmina Grodziczno is a rural gmina (administrative district) in Nowe Miasto County, Warmian-Masurian Voivodeship, in northern Poland. Its seat is the village of Grodziczno, which lies approximately 12 kilometres (7 mi) east of Nowe Miasto Lubawskie and 64 km (40 mi) south-west of the regional capital Olsztyn.

The gmina covers an area of 154.27 square kilometres (59.6 sq mi), and as of 2006 its total population is 6,195 (6,392 in 2011).

== Villages ==
Gmina Grodziczno contains the villages and settlements of Białobłoty, Boleszyn, Grodziczno, Jakubkowo, Katlewo, Kowaliki, Kuligi, Linowiec, Lorki, Montowo, Mroczenko, Mroczno, Nowe Grodziczno, Ostaszewo, Rynek, Świniarc, Trzcin, Zajączkowo and Zwiniarz.

== Neighbouring gminas ==
Gmina Grodziczno is bordered by the gminas of Bratian, Brzozie, Kurzętnik, Lidzbark, Lubawa, and Rybno.
