= Brzozie Lubawskie =

- Village
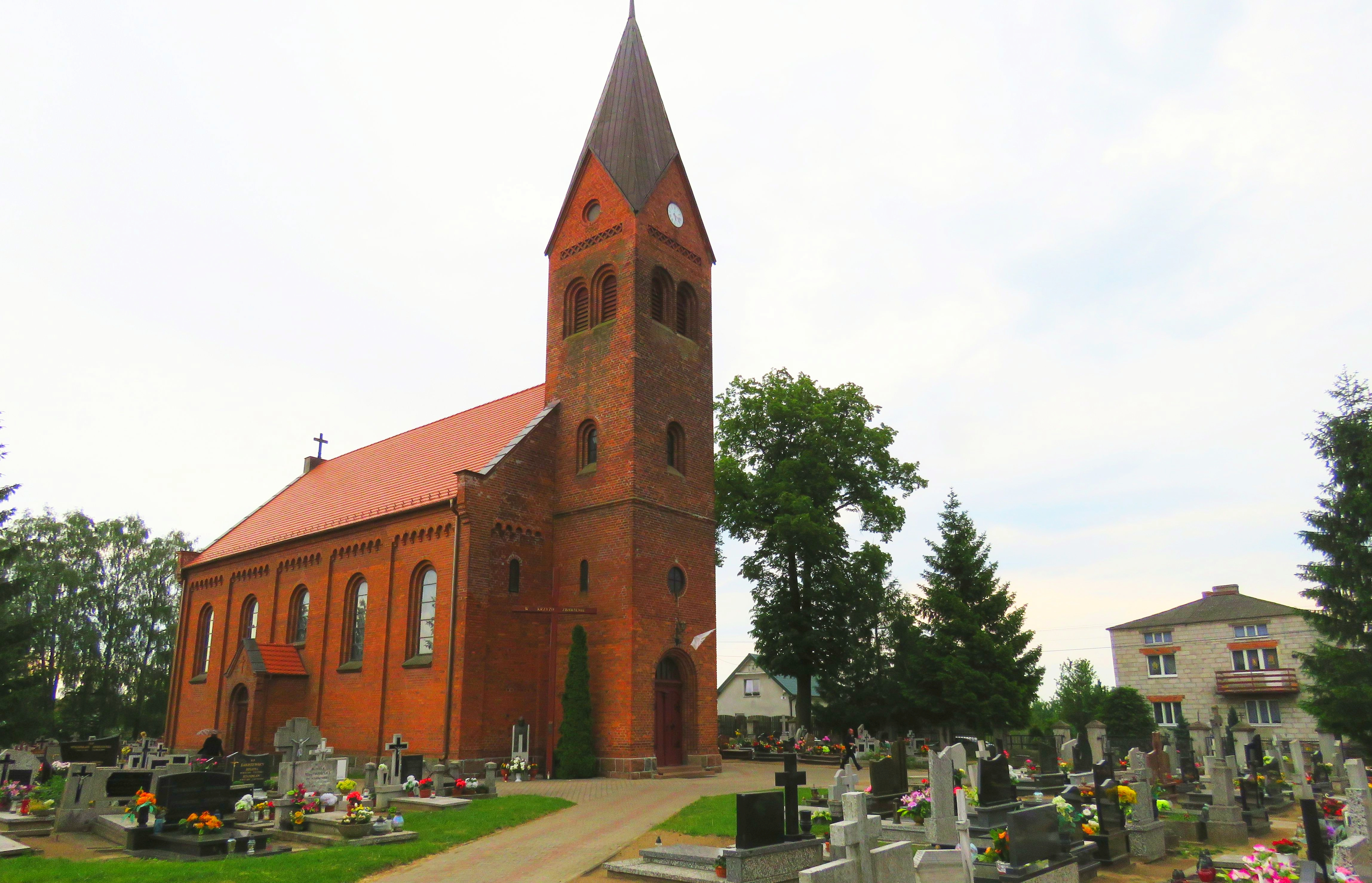

- Location within Poland
- Coordinates: 53°21′N 19°34′E
- Country: Poland
- Voivodeship: Warmian-Masurian
- County: Nowe Miasto
- Gmina: Kurzętnik

Brzozie Lubawskie [ˈbʐɔʑɛ luˈbafskʲɛ] is a village in the administrative district of Gmina Kurzętnik, within Nowe Miasto County, Warmian-Masurian Voivodeship, in northern Poland.
