= Gmina Brzozie =

Gmina Brzozie Brzozie Commune
- Gmina
- Flag Coat of arms
- Interactive map of Gmina Brzozie
- Coordinates (Brzozie): 53°19′N 19°36′E
- Country: Poland
- Voivodeship: Kuyavian-Pomeranian
- County: Brodnica
- Seat: Brzozie

Area
  - Total: 93.74 km^{2} (36.19 sq mi)

Population (2011)
  - Total: 3,746
  - Density: 39.96/km^{2} (103.5/sq mi)

Gmina Brzozie is a rural gmina (administrative district) in Brodnica County, Kuyavian-Pomeranian Voivodeship, in north-central Poland. Its seat is the village of Brzozie, which lies approximately 16 kilometres (10 mi) north-east of Brodnica and 73 km (45 mi) north-east of Toruń.

The gmina covers an area of 93.74 square kilometres (36.2 sq mi), and as of 2006 its total population is 3,589 (3,746 in 2011).

The gmina contains part of the protected area called Górzno-Lidzbark Landscape Park.

== Villages ==
Gmina Brzozie contains the villages and settlements of Brzozie, Jajkowo, Janówko, Małe Leźno, Mały Głęboczek, Sugajno, Świecie, Trepki, Wielki Głęboczek, Wielkie Leźno and Zembrze.

== Neighbouring gminas ==
Gmina Brzozie is bordered by the gminas of Bartniczka, Brodnica, Grodziczno, Kurzętnik, Lidzbark and Zbiczno.
