= Wielkie Leźno =

- Village
- Location within Poland
- Coordinates: 53°17′27″N 19°41′30″E
- Country: Poland
- Voivodeship: Kuyavian-Pomeranian
- County: Brodnica
- Gmina: Brzozie

Wielkie Leźno [ˈvjɛlkʲɛ ˈlɛʑnɔ] is a village in the administrative district of Gmina Brzozie, within Brodnica County, Kuyavian-Pomeranian Voivodeship, in north-central Poland.
