= Małe Leźno =

- Village
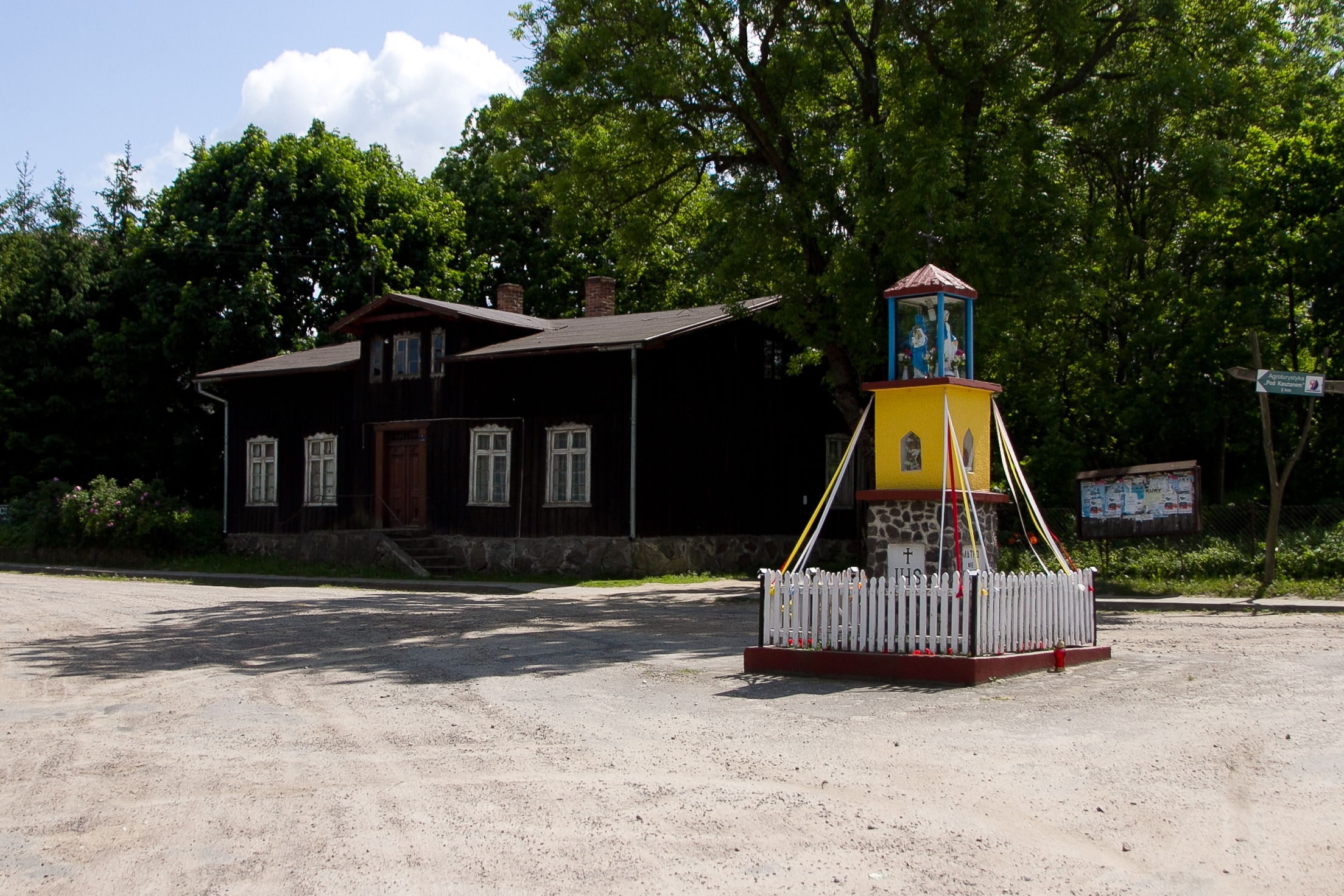
- Centre of the village, the chapel at the crossroads and a wooden house

- Location within Poland
- Coordinates: 53°16′48″N 19°42′00″E
- Country: Poland
- Voivodeship: Kuyavian-Pomeranian
- County: Brodnica
- Gmina: Brzozie

Małe Leźno [ˈmawɛ ˈlɛʑnɔ] is a village in the administrative district of Gmina Brzozie, within Brodnica County, Kuyavian-Pomeranian Voivodeship, in north-central Poland.
