= Sugajno =

- Village
- Location within Poland
- Coordinates: 53°20′N 19°40′E
- Country: Poland
- Voivodeship: Kuyavian-Pomeranian
- County: Brodnica
- Gmina: Brzozie

Sugajno [suˈɡai̯nɔ] is a village in the administrative district of Gmina Brzozie, within Brodnica County, Kuyavian-Pomeranian Voivodeship, in north-central Poland.
