= Brzozie, Brodnica County =

Brzozie
- Village
- Location within Poland
- Coordinates: 53°19′N 19°36′E
- Country: Poland
- Voivodeship: Kuyavian-Pomeranian
- County: Brodnica
- Gmina: Brzozie
- Population: 1,578

Brzozie [ˈbʐɔʑɛ] is a village in Brodnica County, Kuyavian-Pomeranian Voivodeship, in north-central Poland. It is the seat of the gmina (administrative district) called Gmina Brzozie.
