= Świecie, Brodnica County =

Świecie
- Village
- Location within Poland
- Coordinates: 53°17′04″N 19°32′05″E
- Country: Poland
- Voivodeship: Kuyavian-Pomeranian
- County: Brodnica
- Gmina: Brzozie

Świecie (Polish: [ˈɕfjɛt͡ɕɛ]) is a village in the administrative district of Gmina Brzozie, within Brodnica County, Kuyavian-Pomeranian Voivodeship, in north-central Poland.
