= Mroczno =

- Village
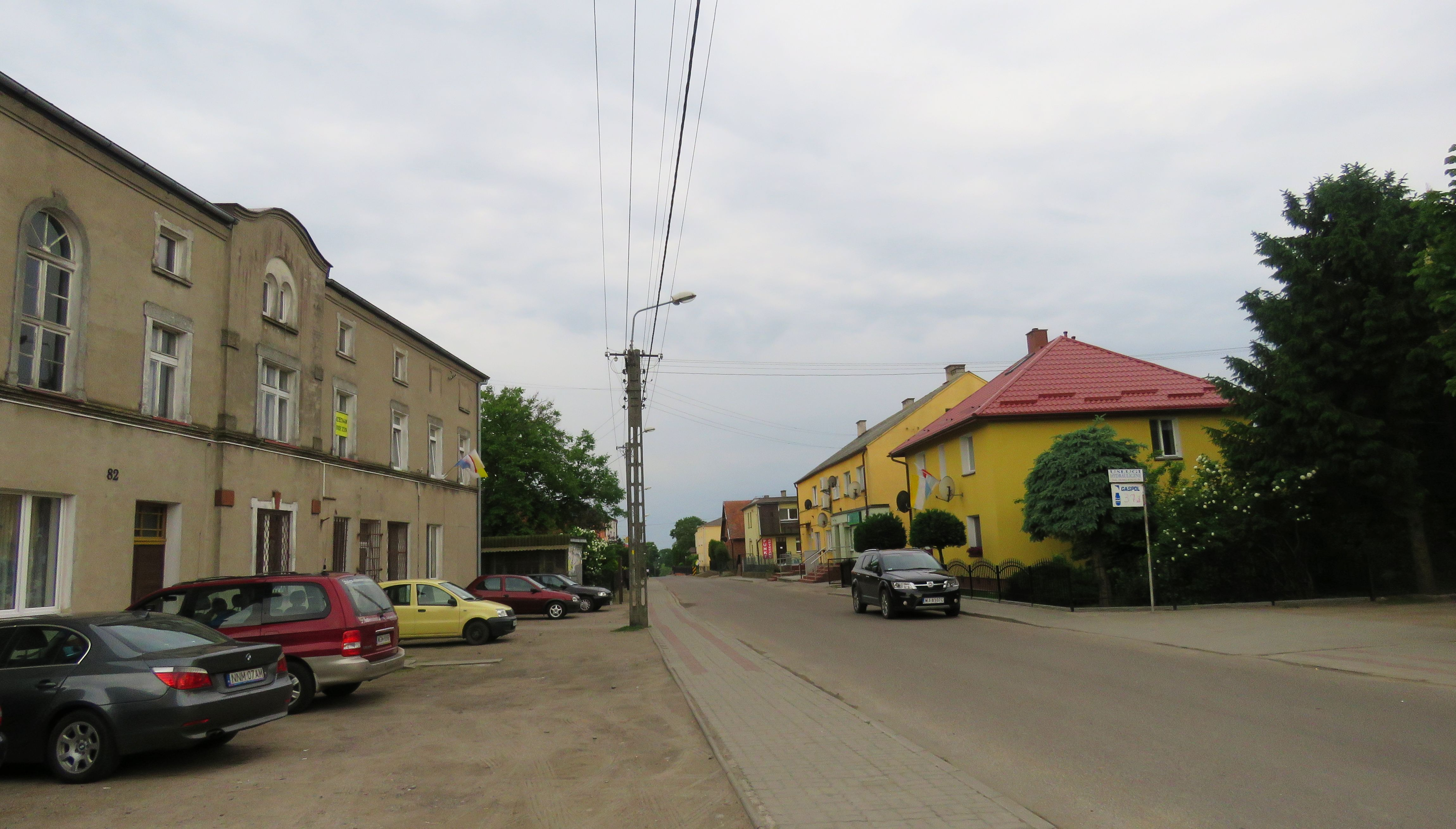

- Location within Poland
- Coordinates: 53°21′11″N 19°42′10″E
- Country: Poland
- Voivodeship: Warmian-Masurian
- County: Nowe Miasto
- Gmina: Grodziczno

Mroczno [ˈmrɔt͡ʂnɔ] is a village in the administrative district of Gmina Grodziczno, within Nowe Miasto County, Warmian-Masurian Voivodeship, in northern Poland.
