= Sumin =

Sumin may refer to

- Sumin, Brodnica County in Kuyavian-Pomeranian Voivodeship (north-central Poland)
- Sumin, Lipno County in Kuyavian-Pomeranian Voivodeship (north-central Poland)
- Sumin, Gmina Tarnawatka, Tomaszów County in Lublin Voivodeship (east Poland)
- Sumin, Włodawa County in Lublin Voivodeship (east Poland)
- Sumin, Greater Poland Voivodeship (west-central Poland)
- Sumin, Pomeranian Voivodeship (north Poland)
- Sumin, Warmian-Masurian Voivodeship (north Poland)

People with the surname Sumin:

- Avenir Sumin (1858–1933), Russian jewellery-maker
- Aleksandr Sumin (born 1995), Russian football player
- Bae Su-min (born 2001), member of K-Pop group STAYC
- Pyotr Sumin (1946–2011), governor of Chelyabinsk Oblast, Russia
- Sumin (born 1991), Korean musician.

== See also ==
- Soo-min, Korean given name also spelled Su-min
