= MEC =

MEC may refer to:

== Businesses ==
- MEC (media agency), a media agency network based in London and New York
- Mediterranean Exploration Company, a restaurant in Portland, Oregon
- Mongolia Energy Corporation, a mining company
- Morgan Electro Ceramics, a ceramics manufacturing company
- Mountain Equipment Co-op, a defunct Canadian outdoors gear & clothing retail co-operative
  - MEC Canada, its successor
- Myanmar Economic Corporation, a Burmese military-owned corporation

== Education ==
- Mymensingh Engineering College, Mymensingh, Bangladesh.
- Manufacturing Engineering Centre, Cardiff University, United Kingdom
- Master of Economics (M.Ec.), a postgraduate degree
- Midland Empire Conference, a high school activity conference in Missouri, USA
- Model Engineering College, Cochin, Kerala, India

== Medicine ==
- Mucoepidermoid carcinoma

== Politics ==
- Member of the Executive Council, a member of the South African provincial government
- Ministry of Education (Brazil), the Brazilian education ministry
- Ministry of Education and Culture (Uruguay)
- Movement for Economic Change, a political party in Lesotho

== Religion ==
- Methodist Episcopal Church, the progenitor of present-day Methodist denominations in the Americas
- Metropolitan Evangelistic Church, a Methodist denomination in the holiness movement

== Sports ==
- Madureira Esporte Clube, an association football club in Rio de Janeiro, Brazil
- MEC (basketball), Maison d'Enfants Club, a professional basketball club in Casablanca, Morocco
- Motor Enthusiasts Club, motor club in the Republic of Ireland
- Mountain East Conference, a U.S. college athletic conference

== Transport ==
- Eloy Alfaro International Airport (IATA airport code), Manta, Ecuador
- Maine Central Railroad (reporting mark), a former railroad in Maine, U.S.
- Meols Cop railway station (National Rail code), Merseyside, England

== Technology ==
- Media Expansion Card, a type of PCIe computer expansion card
- Microbial electrolysis cell, a type of bioelectrochemical system
- Multi-access edge computing, a network architecture concept

== Other ==
- Marginal efficiency of capital, an economics theory
- Measured environmental concentration of a substance in an environmental sample
- Mec, Poland
- Munitions and explosives of concern, unexploded ordnance
