= Babalice =

- Village
- Location within Poland
- Coordinates: 53°29′22″N 19°17′9″E
- Country: Poland
- Voivodeship: Warmian-Masurian
- County: Nowe Miasto
- Gmina: Biskupiec
- Population: 80

Babalice [babaˈlit͡sɛ] is a village in the administrative district of Gmina Biskupiec, within Nowe Miasto County, Warmian-Masurian Voivodeship, in northern Poland.
