= Łąkorek =

- Village
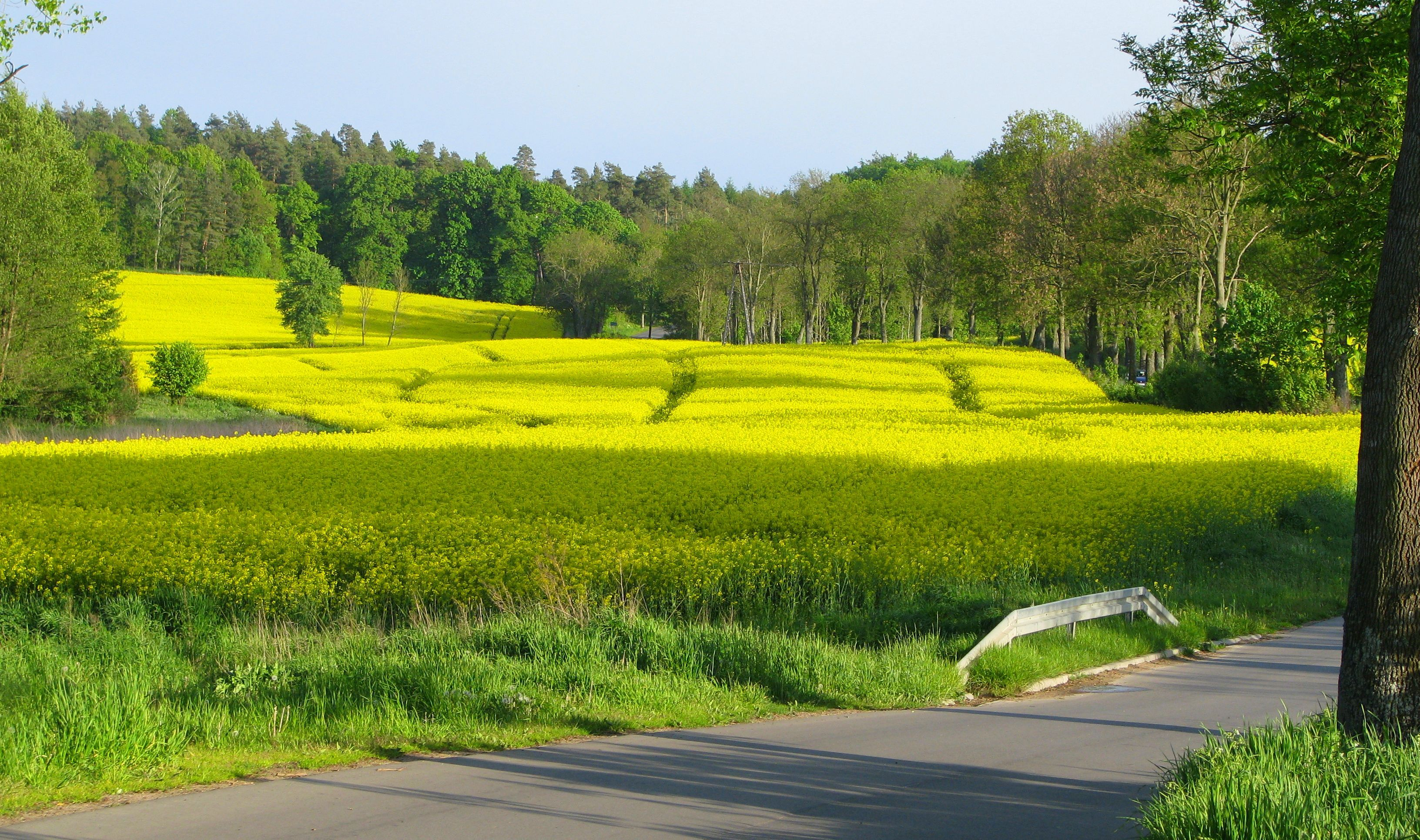

- Location within Poland
- Coordinates: 53°24′58″N 19°20′16″E
- Country: Poland
- Voivodeship: Warmian-Masurian
- County: Nowe Miasto
- Gmina: Biskupiec
- Population (approx.): 200

Łąkorek [wɔnˈkɔrɛk] is a village in the administrative district of Gmina Biskupiec, within Nowe Miasto County, Warmian-Masurian Voivodeship, in northern Poland.

== Notable residents ==
- Friedrich Lange (1849–1927), German surgeon
