= Leszczyniak =

- Settlement
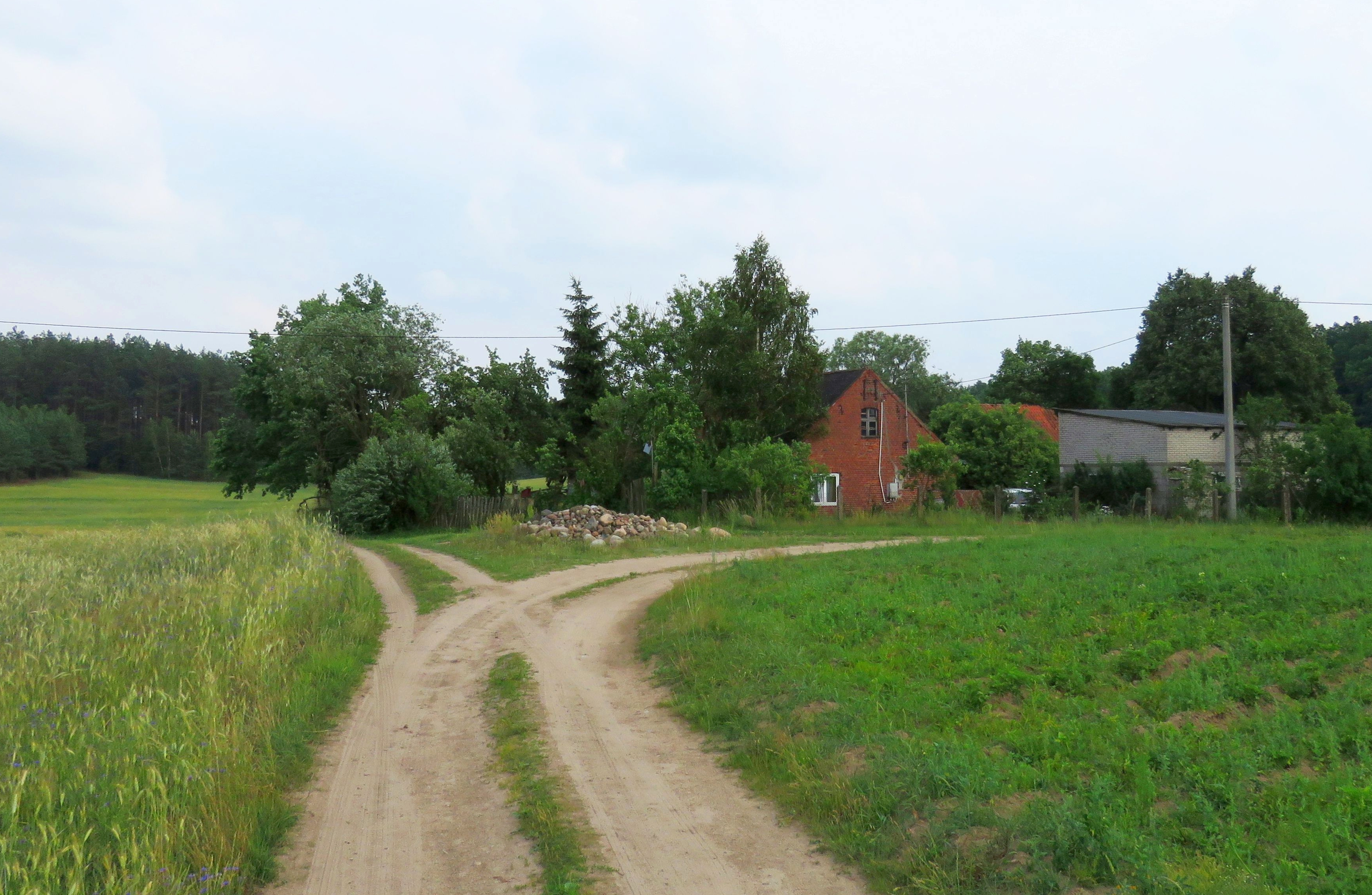
- Road in Leszcyniak

- Location within Poland
- Coordinates: 53°29′51″N 19°25′26″E
- Country: Poland
- Voivodeship: Warmian-Masurian
- County: Nowe Miasto
- Gmina: Biskupiec

Leszczyniak [lɛʂˈt͡ʂɨɲak] is a settlement in the administrative district of Gmina Biskupiec, within Nowe Miasto County, Warmian-Masurian Voivodeship, in northern Poland.
