= Piotrowice, Nowe Miasto County =

Piotrowice
- Village
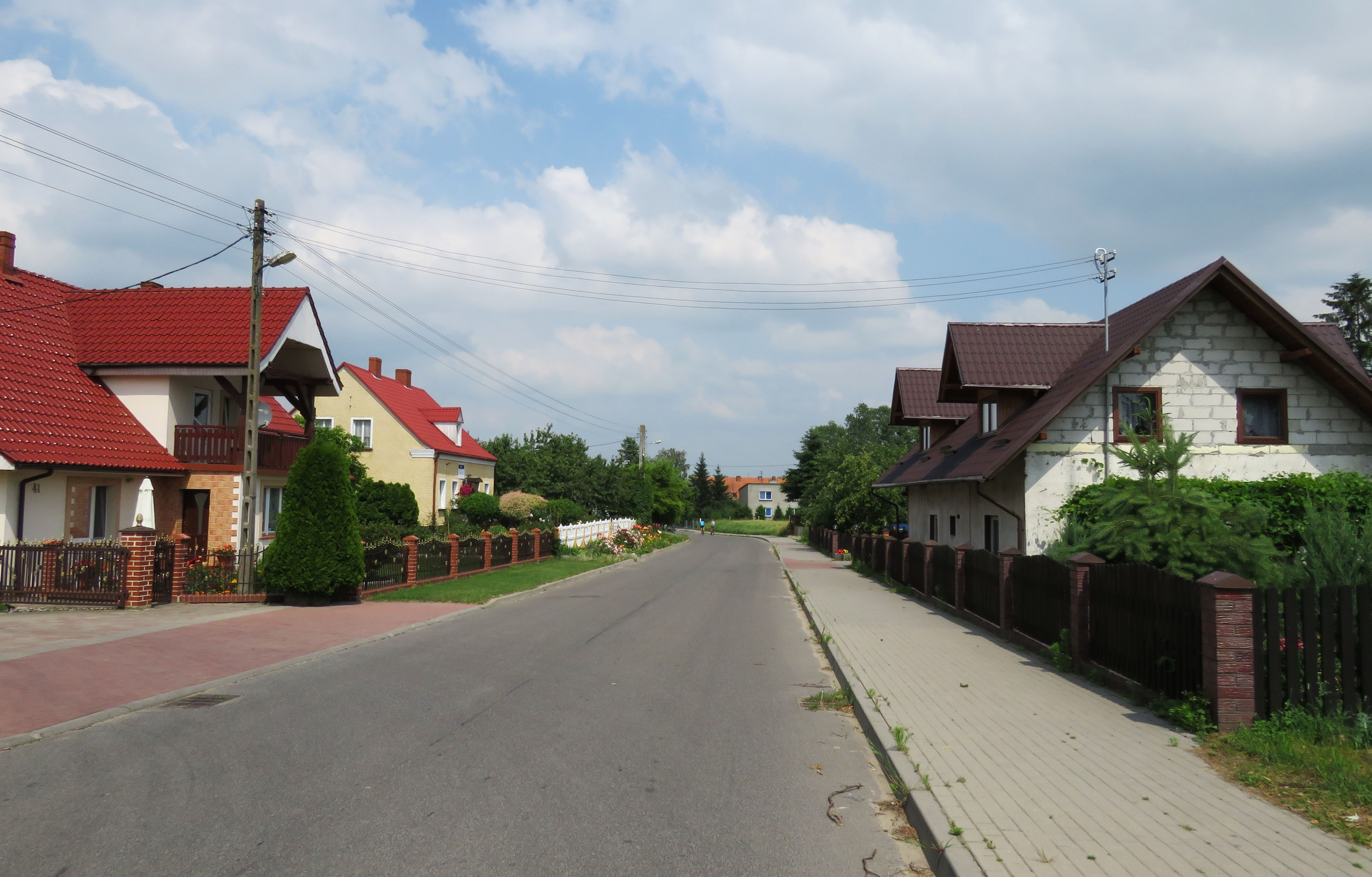

- Location within Poland
- Coordinates: 53°32′N 19°21′E
- Country: Poland
- Voivodeship: Warmian-Masurian
- County: Nowe Miasto
- Gmina: Biskupiec

Piotrowice [pjɔtrɔˈvit͡sɛ] is a village in the administrative district of Gmina Biskupiec, within Nowe Miasto County, Warmian-Masurian Voivodeship, in northern Poland.
