= Sędzice, Warmian-Masurian Voivodeship =

Sędzice
- Village
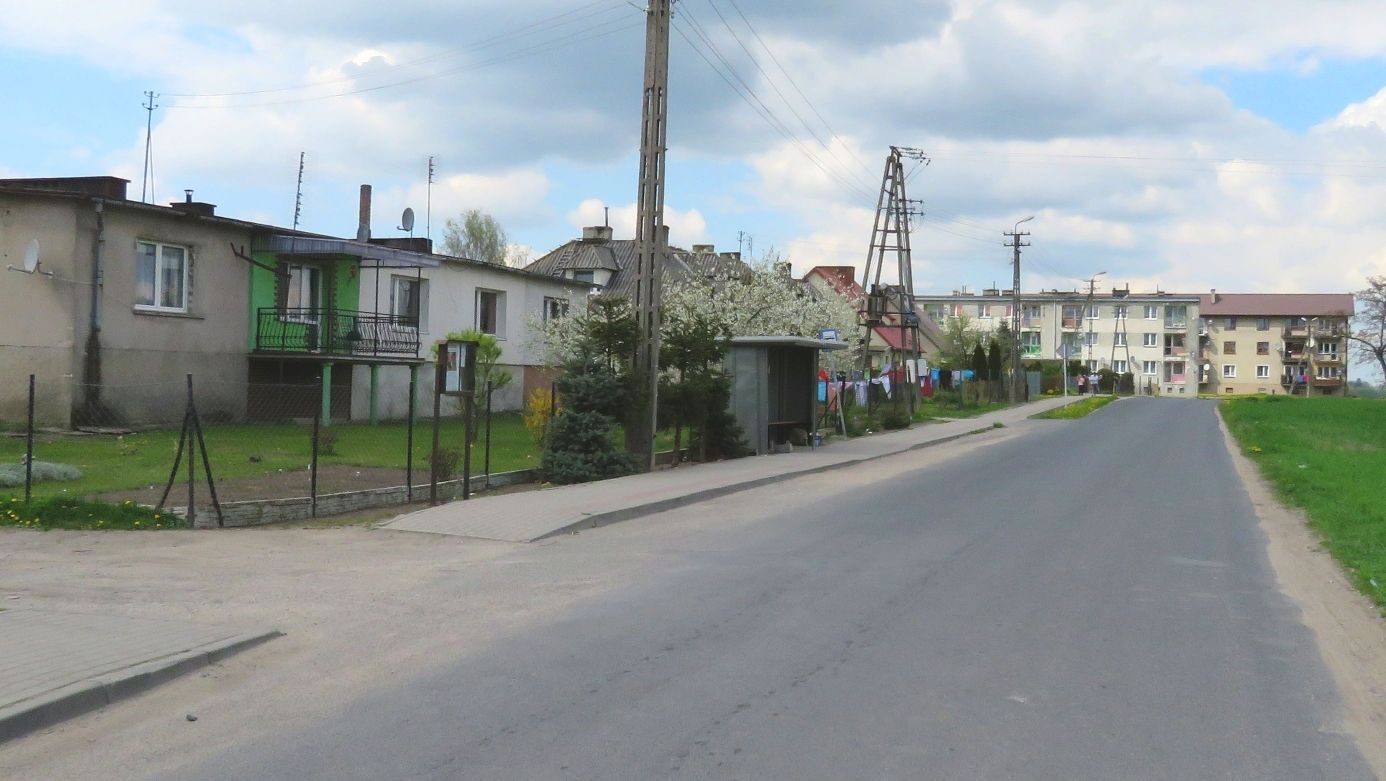

- Location within Poland
- Coordinates: 53°29′17″N 19°18′43″E
- Country: Poland
- Voivodeship: Warmian-Masurian
- County: Nowe Miasto
- Gmina: Biskupiec

Sędzice [sɛnˈd͡ʑit͡sɛ] is a village in the administrative district of Gmina Biskupiec, within Nowe Miasto County, Warmian-Masurian Voivodeship, in northern Poland.
