= Czachówki =

- Village
- Location within Poland
- Coordinates: 53°29′9″N 19°24′38″E
- Country: Poland
- Voivodeship: Warmian-Masurian
- County: Nowe Miasto
- Gmina: Biskupiec

Czachówki [t͡ʂaˈxufki] is a village in the administrative district of Gmina Biskupiec, within Nowe Miasto County, Warmian-Masurian Voivodeship, in northern Poland.

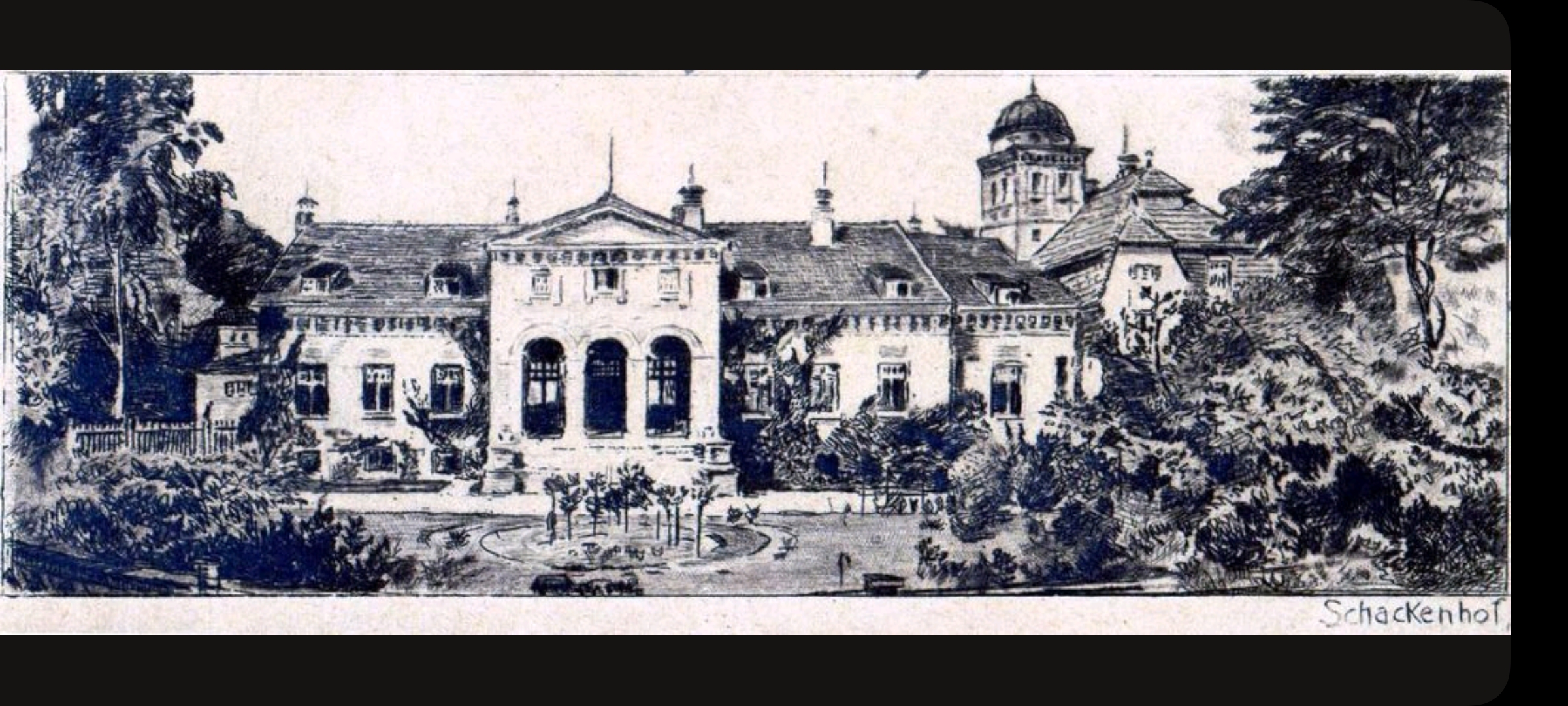
Schackenhof 1900

Schackenhof was an agricultural estate owned by the Rüchardt family from 1814 until 1945. The estate consisted of a central building with about 680 hectares (1,700 acres) farmland and numerous additional farms.

Gottlieb Ernst Rüchardt acquired the Rittergut Schackenhof on 15 July 1814. He operated the agricultural estate, followed by his son August Adolf Eduard Rüchardt and grandson Adolf Theophil Eduard Rüchardt. Grandson Georg Konrad Lebrecht Rüchardt, who had not inherited the estate, had gone to Moscow in about 1880 and married into the trading company Wogau & Co, where he became a director and co-owner. In about 1900 he took over Schackenhof and expanded the main building to the palace that remains today. The estate was run by an administrative director and served the family until 1905 as one of their summer residences.

In 1905, Georg Konrad Lebrecht and his family, who had been living in the German colony in Moscow, moved to Schackenhof because his wife, Fanny von Wogau, did not feel safe in Moscow in the lead-up to the Russian Revolution. From 1905 until 1944, Schackenhof was the main residence for Georg Lebrecht Rüchardt and his family.

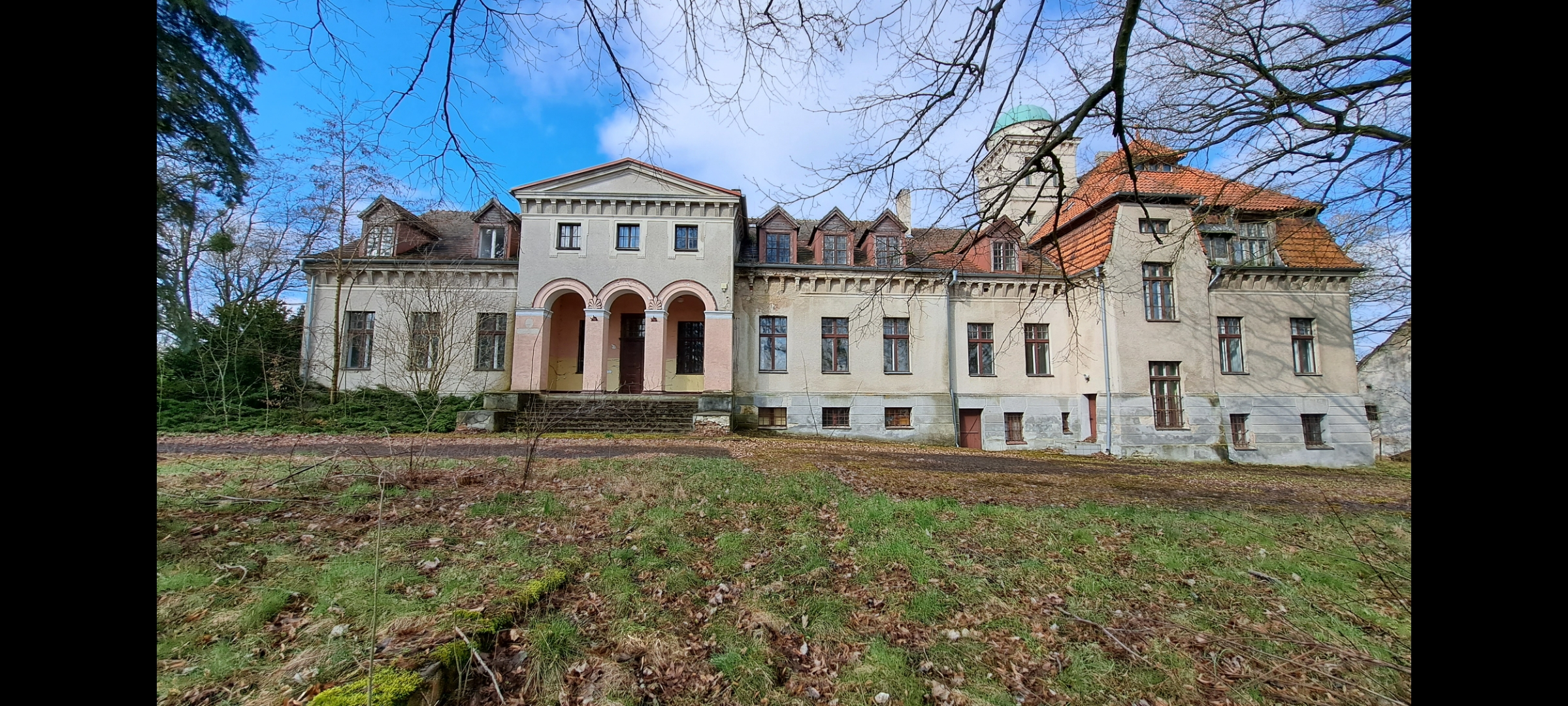
Schackenhof 2023

The end of World War II meant the end of life in Schackenhof as it had been for over 100 years. Some of the family managed to escape to the west; others were called into the war or captured and brought to the Russian Gulag. The estate was taken by the Polish Soviet government and integrated into the public agricultural system (LPG). The Schackenhof attached farms were demolished and all the agricultural land and meaningful buildings were integrated into the government-run LPG. The Schackenhof building (the palace), as well as the estate's own electricity plant and administrative building, were kept, as the government found a purpose for it: It became an agricultural school. In this form, the Schackenhof building flourished under the socialist system for many decades. The agricultural school had 274 students, 55 of them living in the building during their education. While there, they also took care of the estate. The school survived the end of the Soviet Union. In 2010, with European funds, a modern gymnasium was built on the grounds of the Schackenhof.
