= Borki, Nowe Miasto County =

Borki
- Settlement
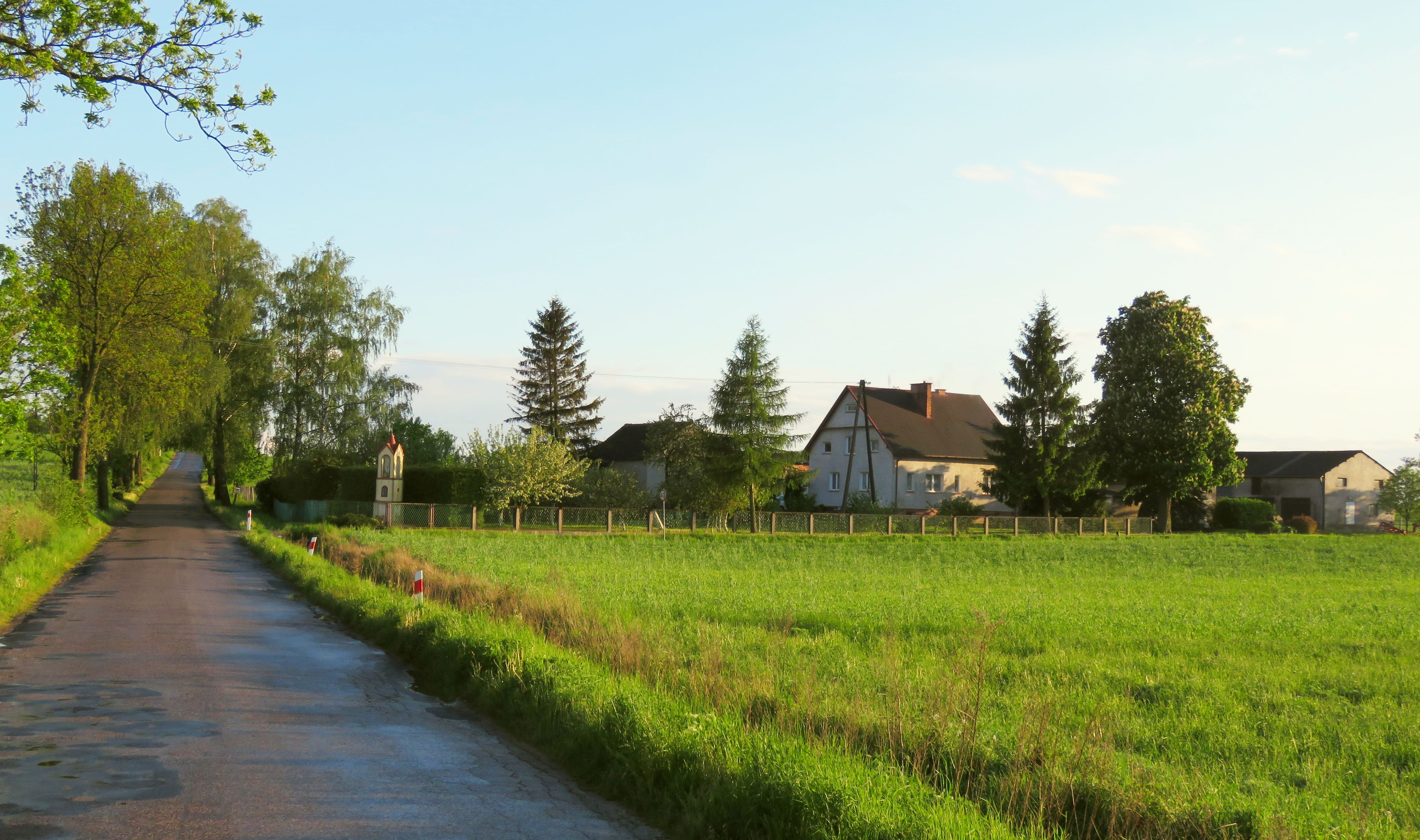

- Location within Poland
- Coordinates: 53°25′45″N 19°19′53″E
- Country: Poland
- Voivodeship: Warmian-Masurian
- County: Nowe Miasto
- Gmina: Biskupiec

Borki [ˈbɔrki] is a settlement in the administrative district of Gmina Biskupiec, within Nowe Miasto County, Warmian-Masurian Voivodeship, in northern Poland.
