= Ostrowite, Nowe Miasto County =

Ostrowite
- Village
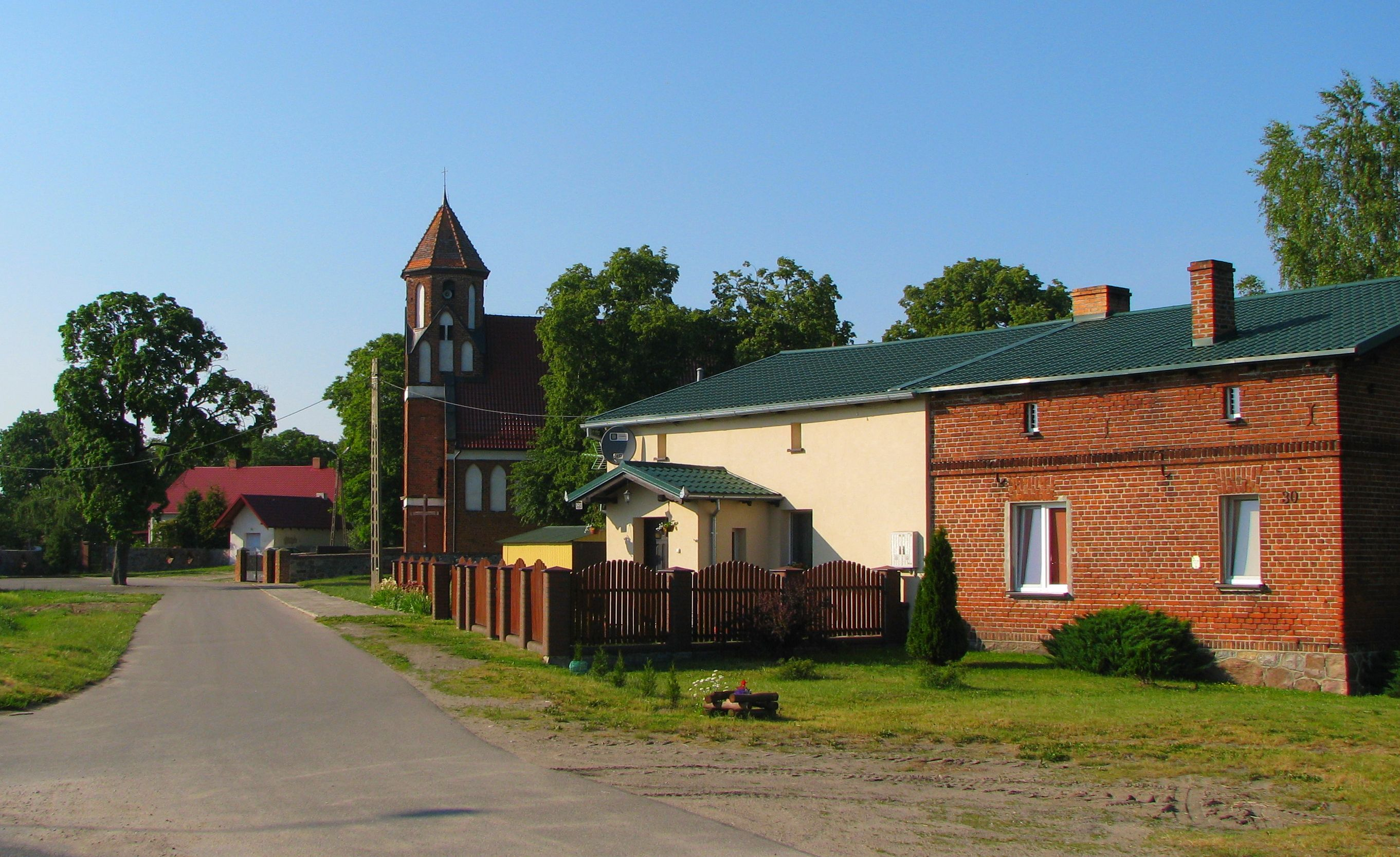

- Location within Poland
- Coordinates: 53°25′N 19°17′E
- Country: Poland
- Voivodeship: Warmian-Masurian
- County: Nowe Miasto
- Gmina: Biskupiec

Ostrowite [ɔstrɔˈvitɛ] is a village in the administrative district of Gmina Biskupiec, within Nowe Miasto County, Warmian-Masurian Voivodeship, in northern Poland.
