= Gmina Biskupiec =

Gmina Biskupiec may refer to either of the following administrative districts in Warmian-Masurian Voivodeship, Poland:

- Gmina Biskupiec, Nowe Miasto County
- Gmina Biskupiec, Olsztyn County
