= Mała Wólka =

- Settlement
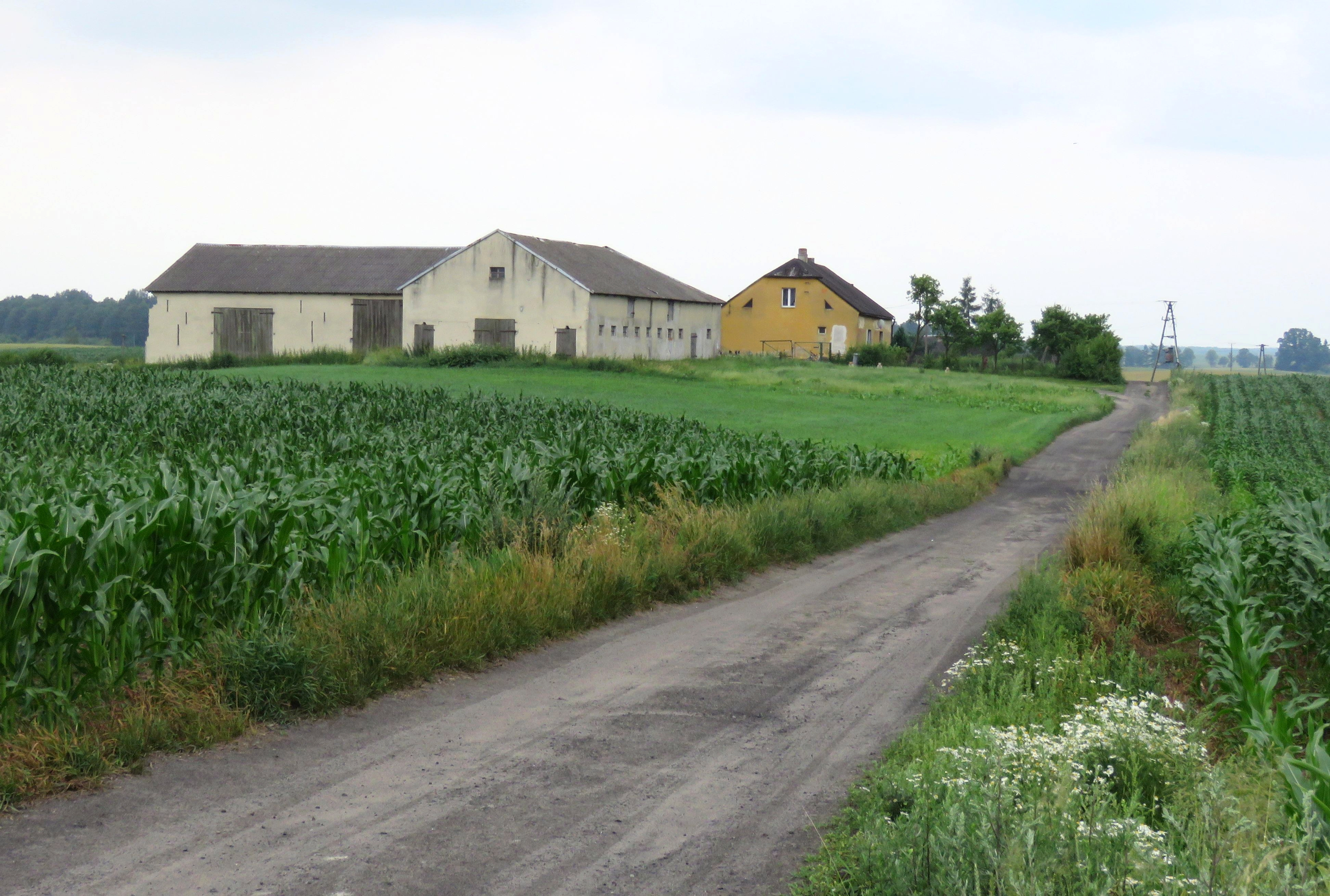

- Location within Poland
- Coordinates: 53°33′22″N 19°25′50″E
- Country: Poland
- Voivodeship: Warmian-Masurian
- County: Nowe Miasto
- Gmina: Biskupiec

Mała Wólka [ˈmawa ˈvulka] is a settlement in the administrative district of Gmina Biskupiec, within Nowe Miasto County, Warmian-Masurian Voivodeship, in northern Poland.
