= Krotoszyny =

- Village
- Location within Poland
- Coordinates: 53°30′9″N 19°23′38″E
- Country: Poland
- Voivodeship: Warmian-Masurian
- County: Nowe Miasto
- Gmina: Biskupiec
- Population (2006): 900

Krotoszyny [krɔtɔˈʂɨnɨ] is a village in the administrative district of Gmina Biskupiec, within Nowe Miasto County, Warmian-Masurian Voivodeship, in northern Poland.
