= Piotrowice Małe, Warmian-Masurian Voivodeship =

Piotrowice Małe
- Village
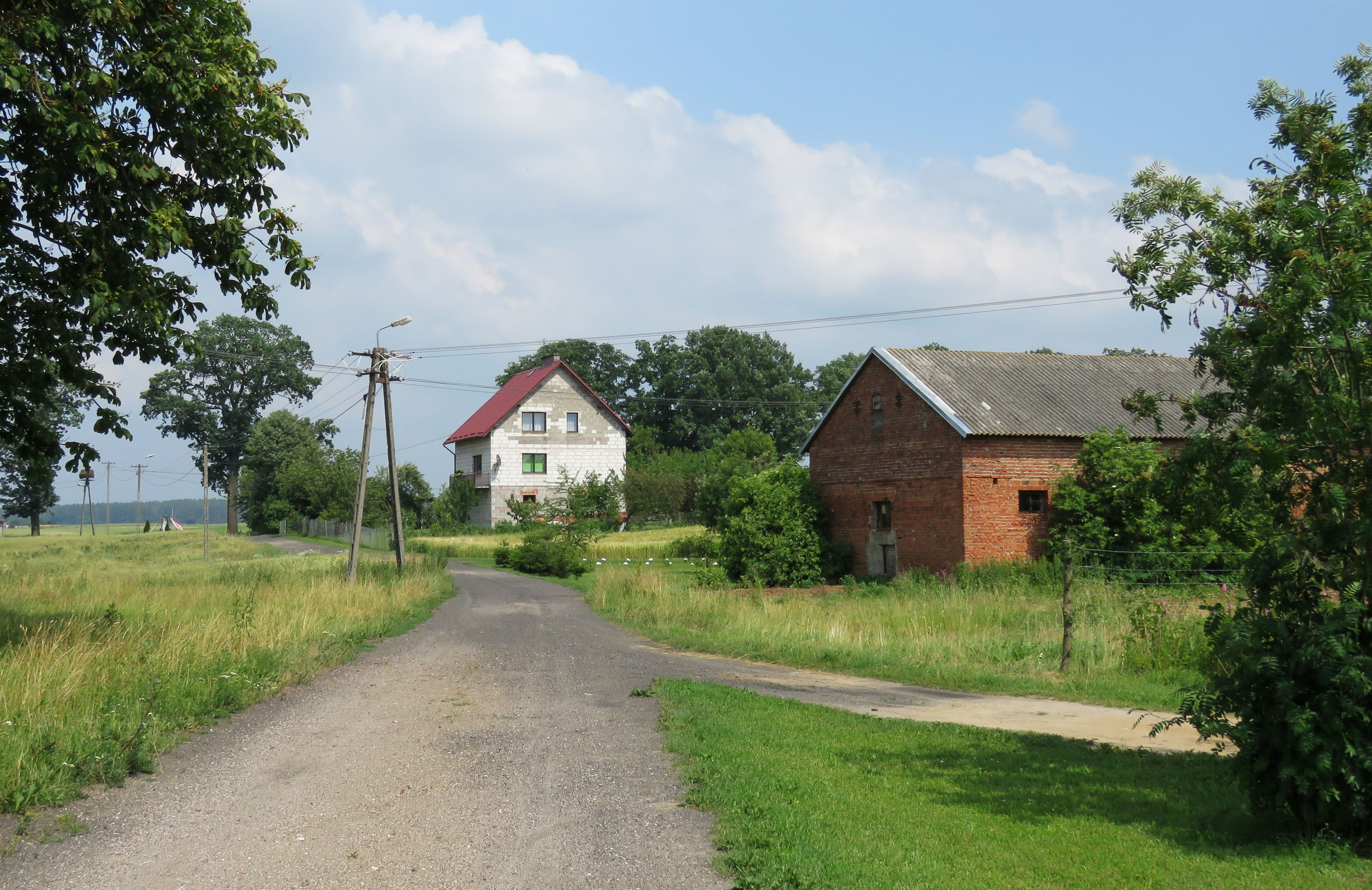

- Location within Poland
- Coordinates: 53°32′29″N 19°19′42″E
- Country: Poland
- Voivodeship: Warmian-Masurian
- County: Nowe Miasto
- Gmina: Biskupiec
- Population: 120

Piotrowice Małe [pjɔtrɔˈvit͡sɛ ˈmawɛ] is a village in the administrative district of Gmina Biskupiec, within Nowe Miasto County, Warmian-Masurian Voivodeship, in northern Poland.
