= Gaj, Nowe Miasto County =

Gaj
- Village
- Location within Poland
- Coordinates: 53°27′25″N 19°22′30″E
- Country: Poland
- Voivodeship: Warmian-Masurian
- County: Nowe Miasto
- Gmina: Biskupiec
- Elevation: 89.7 m (294 ft)
- Population (approx.): 120

Gaj [ɡai̯] is a village in the administrative district of Gmina Biskupiec, within Nowe Miasto County, Warmian-Masurian Voivodeship, in northern Poland.
