= Buczek, Warmian-Masurian Voivodeship =

Buczek
- Settlement
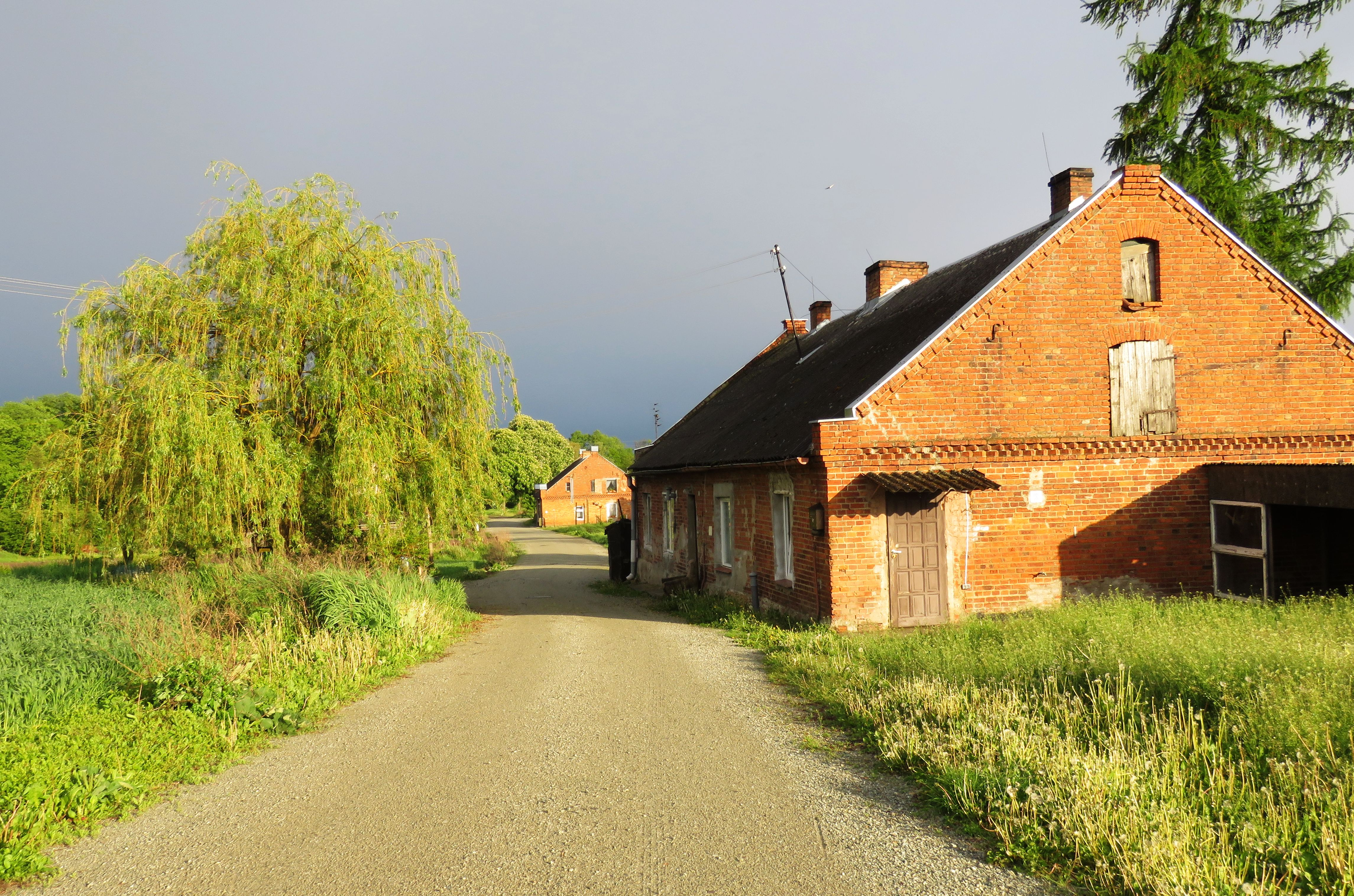

- Location within Poland
- Coordinates: 53°30′57″N 19°24′50″E
- Country: Poland
- Voivodeship: Warmian-Masurian
- County: Nowe Miasto
- Gmina: Biskupiec

Buczek [ˈbut͡ʂɛk] is a settlement in the administrative district of Gmina Biskupiec, within Nowe Miasto County, Warmian-Masurian Voivodeship, in northern Poland.
