= Słupnica =

- Village
- Location within Poland
- Coordinates: 53°31′N 19°19′E
- Country: Poland
- Voivodeship: Warmian-Masurian
- County: Nowe Miasto
- Gmina: Biskupiec
- Population: about 400
- Website: http://www.slupnica.pl.tl

Słupnica [swupˈnit͡sa] is a village in the administrative district of Gmina Biskupiec, within Nowe Miasto County, Warmian-Masurian Voivodeship, in northern Poland.
