= Lipinki, Warmian-Masurian Voivodeship =

Lipinki
- Village
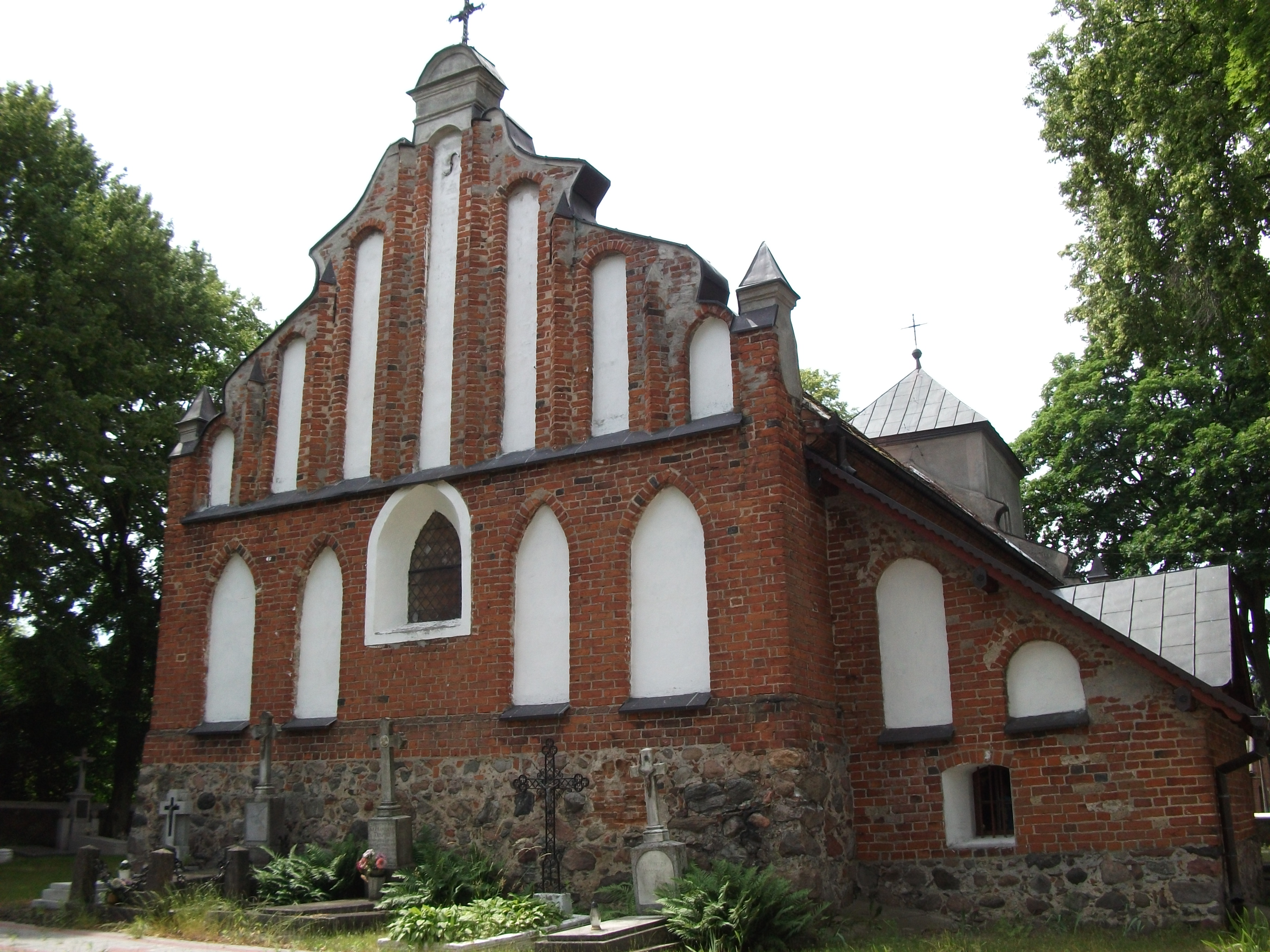
- Gothic Saints Peter and Paul church in Lipinki

- Location within Poland
- Coordinates: 53°28′N 19°19′E
- Country: Poland
- Voivodeship: Warmian-Masurian
- County: Nowe Miasto
- Gmina: Biskupiec
- Population (approx.): 760
- Time zone: UTC+1 (CET)
  - Summer (DST): UTC+2 (CEST)
- Vehicle registration: NNM

Lipinki [lʲiˈpʲiŋkʲi] is a village in the administrative district of Gmina Biskupiec, within Nowe Miasto County, Warmian-Masurian Voivodeship, in northern Poland.

During the German occupation of Poland (World War II), a forced labour subcamp of the Stalag XX-A prisoner-of-war camp was operated by the Germans in the village.
