= Wardęgówko =

- Village
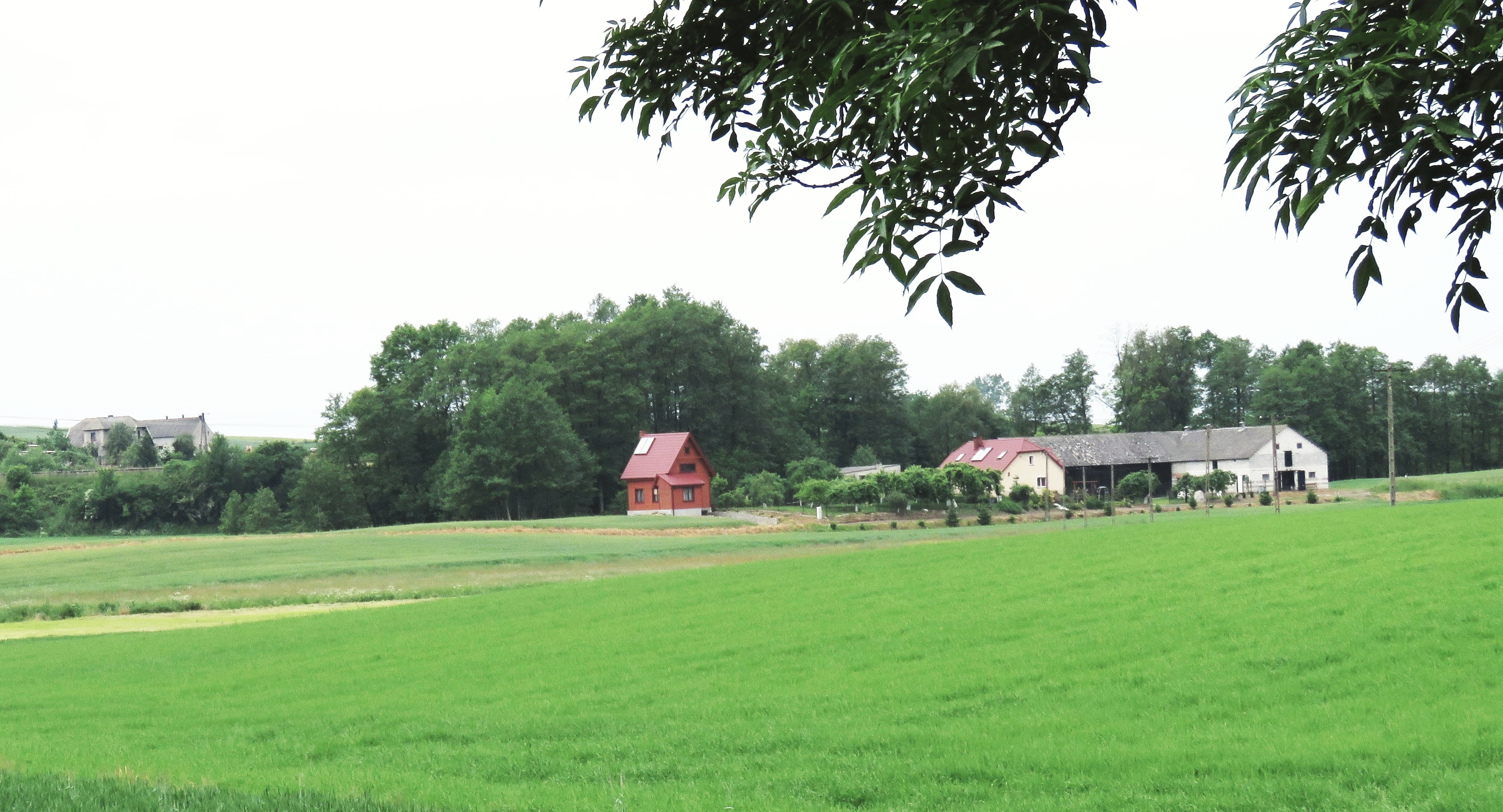

- Location within Poland
- Coordinates: 53°26′55″N 19°16′50″E
- Country: Poland
- Voivodeship: Warmian-Masurian
- County: Nowe Miasto
- Gmina: Biskupiec

Wardęgówko [vardɛnˈɡufkɔ] is a village in the administrative district of Gmina Biskupiec, within Nowe Miasto County, Warmian-Masurian Voivodeship, in northern Poland.
