= Lee Soo-min (disambiguation) =

- Hangul: 이수민
- RR: I Sumin
- MR: I Sumin

Lee Soo-min (born 2001) is a South Korean actress.

Lee Soo-min (Korean: 이수민) is a Korean name consisting of the family name Lee and the given name Soo-min, and may also refer to:

- Lee Soo-min (actress, born 1984), South Korean actress
- Lee Soo-min (golfer) (born 1993), South Korean golfer
