= Fitowo =

- Village
- Location within Poland
- Coordinates: 53°31′N 19°22′E
- Country: Poland
- Voivodeship: Warmian-Masurian
- County: Nowe Miasto
- Gmina: Biskupiec

Fitowo [fiˈtɔvɔ] is a village in the administrative district of Gmina Biskupiec, within Nowe Miasto County, Warmian-Masurian Voivodeship, in northern Poland.
