= Wielka Wólka =

- Village
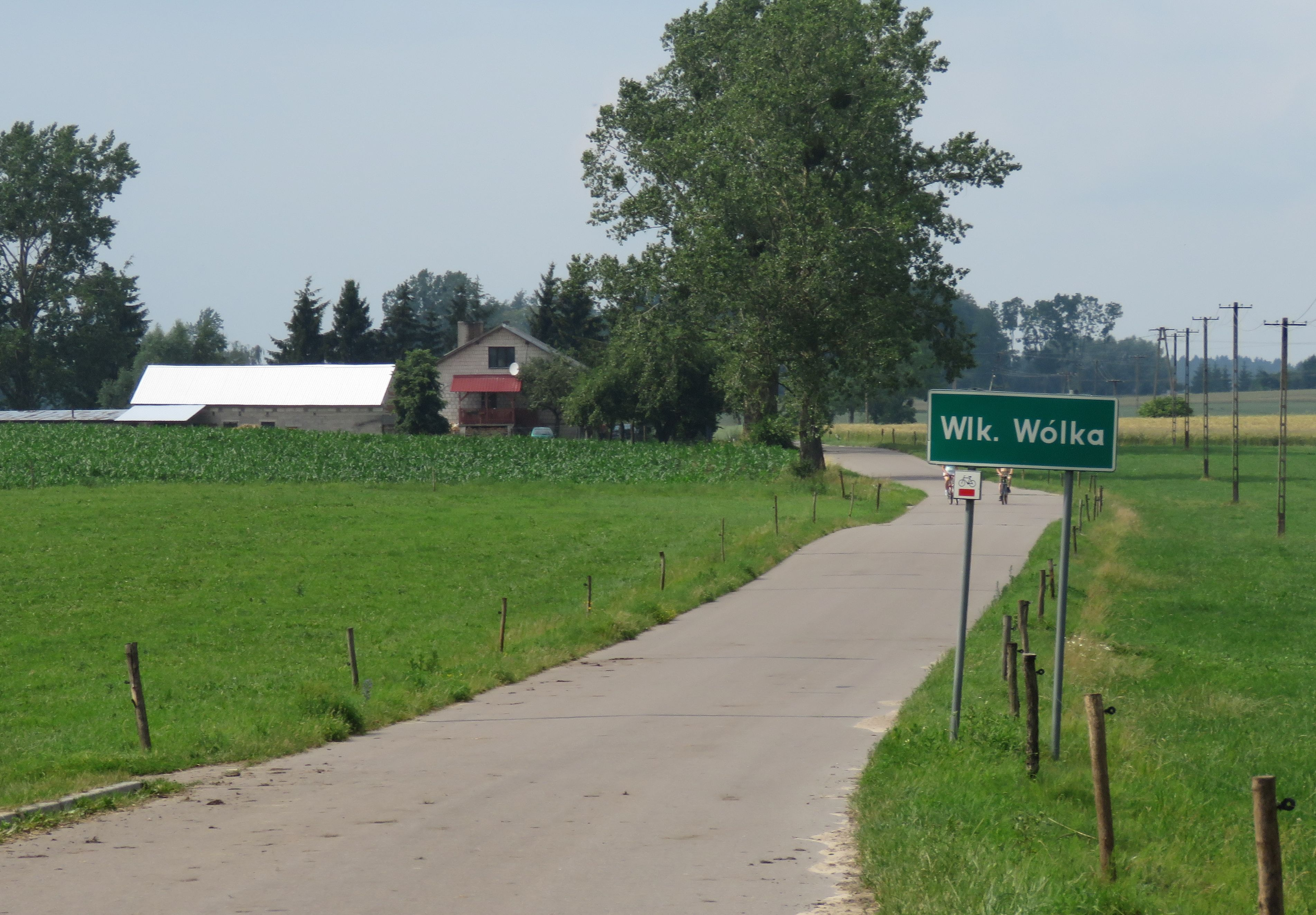

- Location within Poland
- Coordinates: 53°33′45″N 19°26′55″E
- Country: Poland
- Voivodeship: Warmian-Masurian
- County: Nowe Miasto
- Gmina: Biskupiec
- Population: 89

Wielka Wólka [ˈvjɛlka ˈvulka] is a village in the administrative district of Gmina Biskupiec, within Nowe Miasto County, Warmian-Masurian Voivodeship, in northern Poland.
