= Friedrich Lange =

Friedrich Lange may refer to:

- Friedrich Lange (artist) (1834–1875), German history painter
- Friedrich Lange (journalist) (1852-1917), German journalist and activist
- Friedrich Lange (surgeon) (1849–1927), German surgeon and supporter of charitable institutions
- Friedrich Albert Lange (1828–1875), German philosopher and sociologist
