= Osówko, Warmian-Masurian Voivodeship =

Osówko
- Village
- Location within Poland
- Coordinates: 53°29′21″N 19°14′24″E
- Country: Poland
- Voivodeship: Warmian-Masurian
- County: Nowe Miasto
- Gmina: Biskupiec
- Population: 160

Osówko [ɔˈsufkɔ] is a village in the administrative district of Gmina Biskupiec, within Nowe Miasto County, Warmian-Masurian Voivodeship, in northern Poland.
