= Iwanki, Warmian-Masurian Voivodeship =

Iwanki
- Settlement
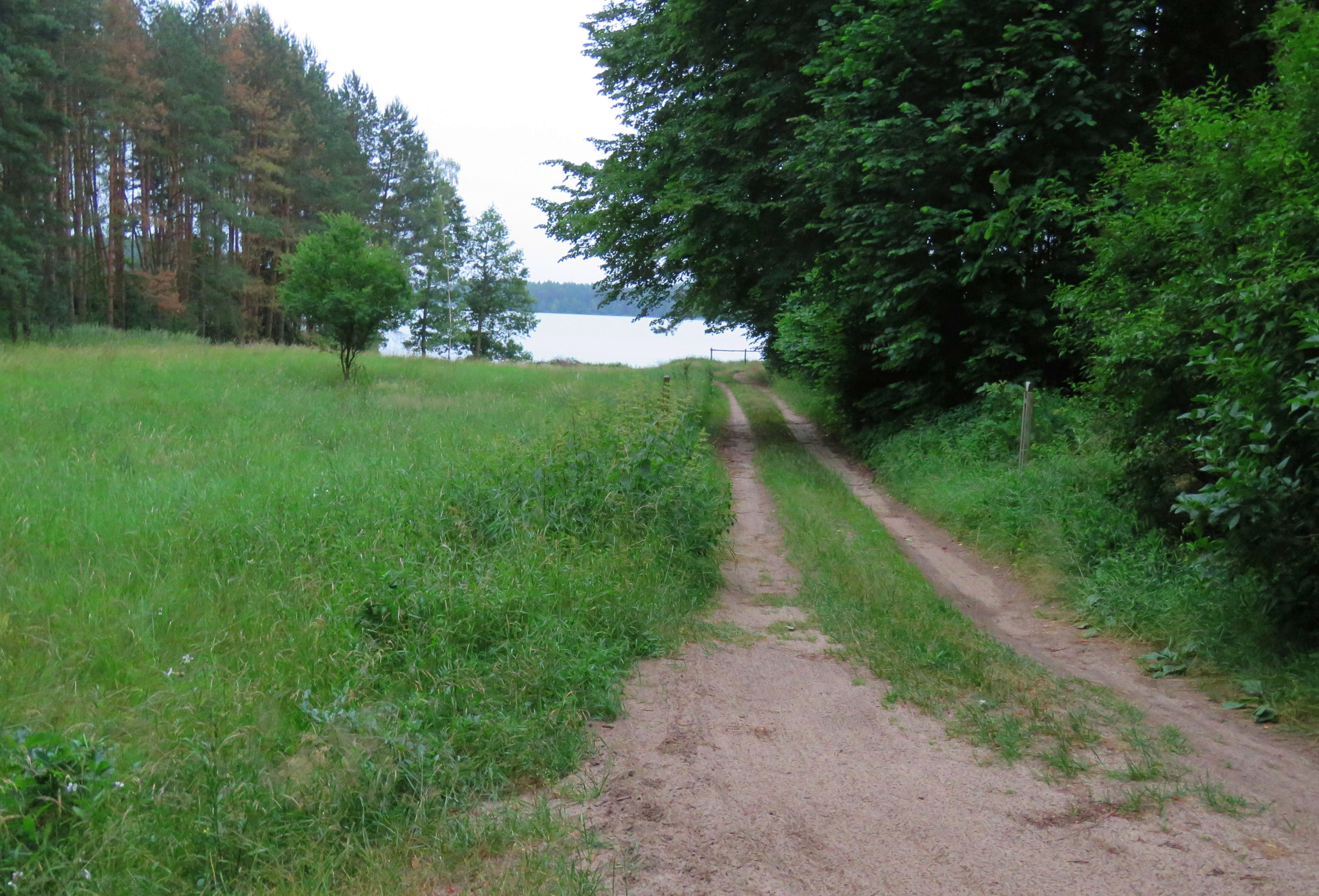

- Location within Poland
- Coordinates: 53°26′N 19°23′E
- Country: Poland
- Voivodeship: Warmian-Masurian
- County: Nowe Miasto
- Gmina: Biskupiec

Iwanki [iˈvanki] is a settlement in the administrative district of Gmina Biskupiec, within Nowe Miasto County, Warmian-Masurian Voivodeship, in northern Poland.
