= Friedrich Lange (surgeon) =

German surgeon (1849–1927)

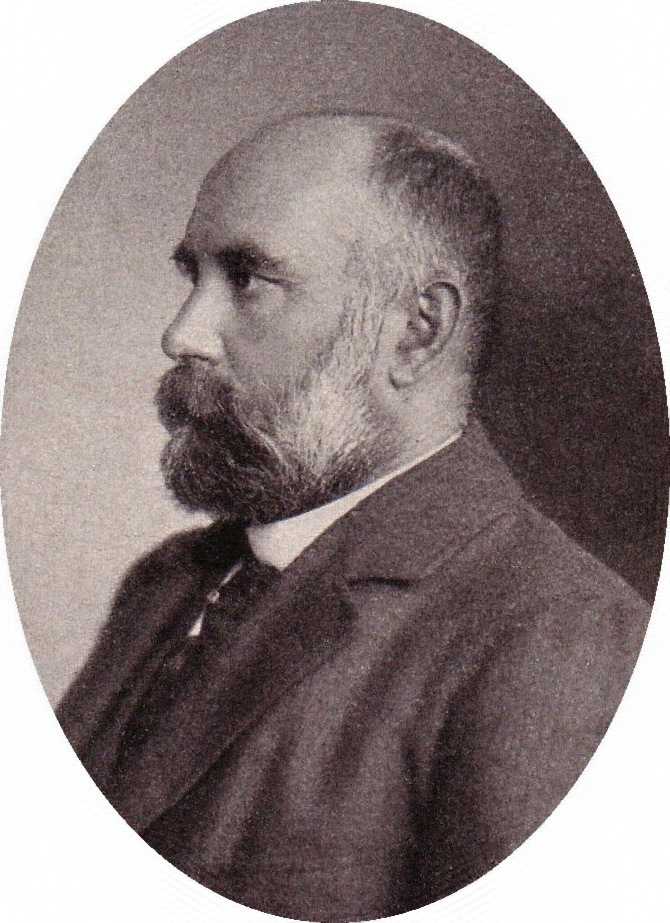
Dr. Friedrich Lange

Friedrich Lange (20 March 1849 – 14 May 1927) was a German surgeon and supporter of charitable institutions.

== Life ==
Friedrich Lange was born in Lonkorrek in the Province of Prussia, the son of Eduard Lange, a local councillor and leaseholder. He studied medicine at the Albertus-Universität Königsberg and served as a hospital orderly in the Franco-Prussian War. He was a fraternity member of the Burschenschaft Gothia in Königsberg. He worked as a surgeon in Königsberg and Kiel.

After his marriage in 1891 he and Adele Thiel moved to New York City, initially working as senior physician in the surgery department of a German hospital, then in the Bellevue Hospital and finally as a consultant in the NewYork–Presbyterian Hospital. After founding his own clinic, he became famous as a 'pioneer of German surgery in America' and for introducing asepsis to America.

In 1900 he returned to Germany and made a large donation to the Palästra Albertina in Königsberg. In Neumark he founded the Kreiskrankenhaus for Kreis Löbau. In Bischofswerder he established a hospice for the disabled. In Lonkorrek he founded a library and a Protestant church.

He died of a stroke in a sanatorium in Potsdam-Babelsberg. A sports ground was named after him on Samitter Allee near Tragheimer Palve in Königsberg.

== Bibliography ==
- (in German) Richard Armstedt: Geschichte der königl. Haupt- und Residenzstadt Königsberg in Preußen. Reprint der Originalausgabe, Stuttgart 1899.
- (in German) Fritz Gause: Die Geschichte der Stadt Königsberg in Preußen. 3 Bände, Köln 1996, ISBN 3-412-08896-X
- (in German) Jürgen Manthey: Königsberg – Geschichte einer Weltbürgerrepublik. Hanser 2005, ISBN 3-446-20619-1
- Gunnar Strunz: Königsberg entdecken. Berlin 2006, ISBN 3-89794-071-X
