= Mec, Poland =

Mec
- Settlement
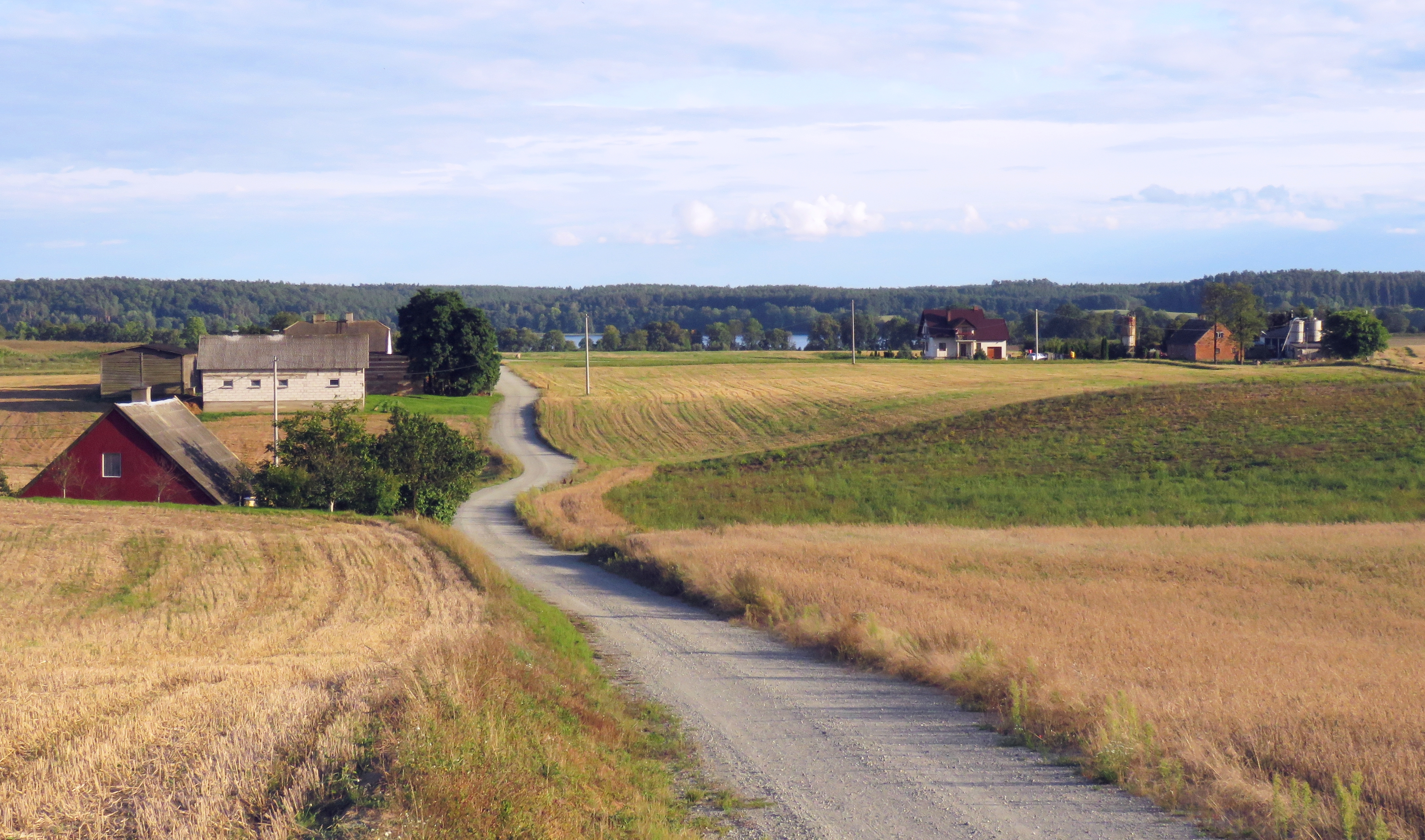

- Location within Poland
- Coordinates: 53°25′N 19°21′E
- Country: Poland
- Voivodeship: Warmian-Masurian
- County: Nowe Miasto
- Gmina: Biskupiec

Mec [mɛt͡s] is a settlement in the administrative district of Gmina Biskupiec, within Nowe Miasto County, Warmian-Masurian Voivodeship, in northern Poland.
