= Sumin, Warmian-Masurian Voivodeship =

Sumin
- Village
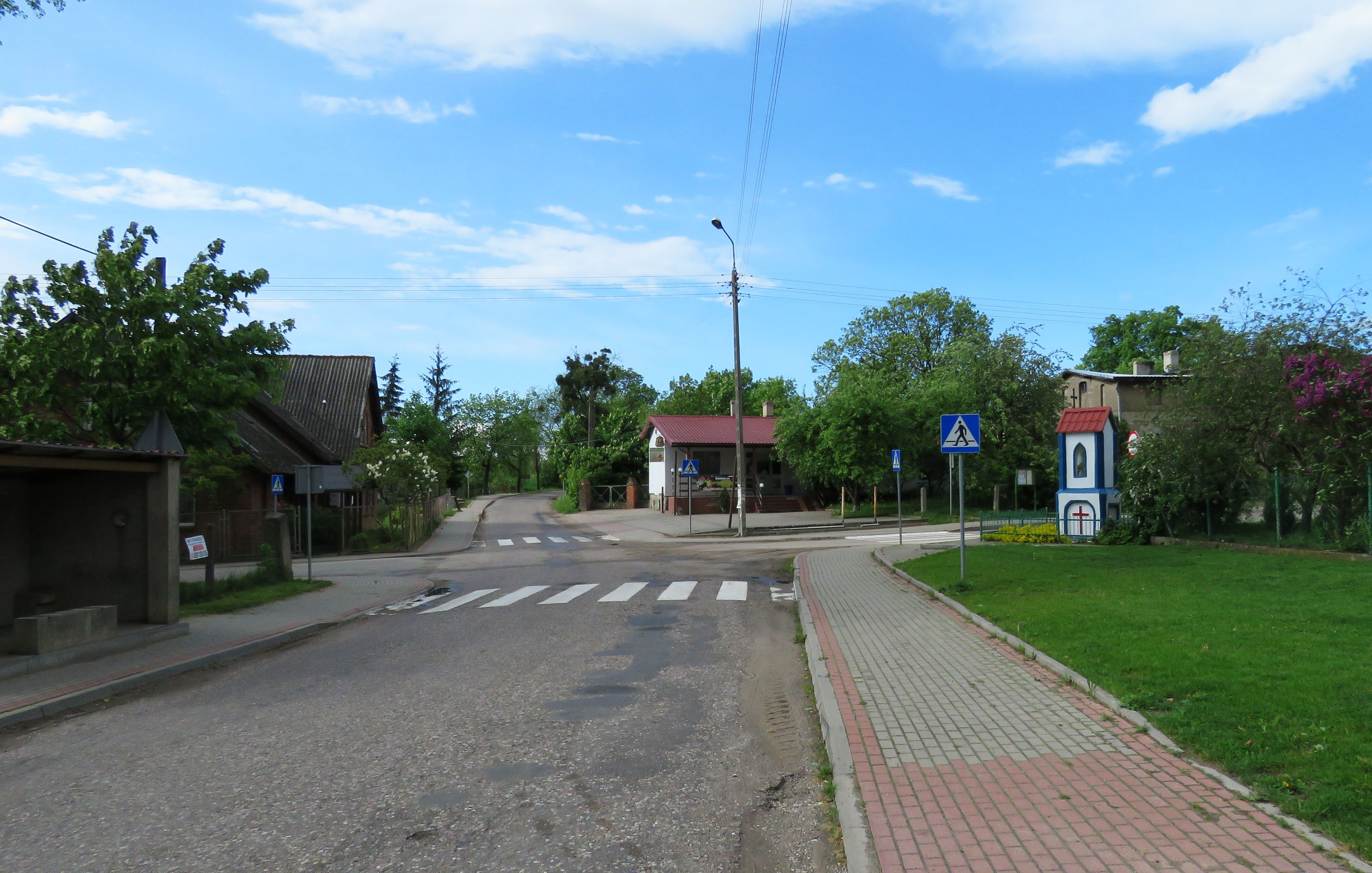
- Street in Sumin

- Location within Poland
- Coordinates: 53°28′43″N 19°14′52″E
- Country: Poland
- Voivodeship: Warmian-Masurian
- County: Nowe Miasto
- Gmina: Biskupiec

Sumin [ˈsumin] is a village in the administrative district of Gmina Biskupiec, within Nowe Miasto County, Warmian-Masurian Voivodeship, in northern Poland.
