= Gmina Biskupiec, Nowe Miasto County =

Gmina Biskupiec Biskupiec Commune
- Gmina
- Coat of arms
- Interactive map of Gmina Biskupiec
- Coordinates (Biskupiec): 53°30′2″N 19°21′2″E
- Country: Poland
- Voivodeship: Warmian-Masurian
- County: Nowe Miasto
- Seat: Biskupiec

Area
  - Total: 241.25 km^{2} (93.15 sq mi)

Population (2011)
  - Total: 9,641
  - Density: 39.96/km^{2} (103.5/sq mi)

Gmina Biskupiec is a rural gmina (administrative district) in Nowe Miasto County, Warmian-Masurian Voivodeship, in northern Poland. Its seat is the village of Biskupiec, which lies approximately 19 kilometres (12 mi) north-west of Nowe Miasto Lubawskie and 83 km (52 mi) south-west of the regional capital Olsztyn.

The gmina covers an area of 241.25 square kilometres (93.1 sq mi), and as of 2006 its total population is 9,652 (9,641 in 2011).

The gmina contains part of the protected area called Brodnica Landscape Park.

== Villages ==
Gmina Biskupiec contains the villages and settlements of Babalice, Bielice, Borki, Buczek, Czachówki, Fitowo, Gaj, Iwanki, Krotoszyny, Łąkorek, Łąkorz, Leszczyniak, Lipinki, Mała Wólka, Mec, Mierzyn, Osetno, Osówko, Ostrowite, Piotrowice, Piotrowice Małe, Podlasek, Podlasek Mały, Rywałdzik, Sędzice, Słupnica, Sumin, Szwarcenowo, Tymawa Wielka, Wąkop, Wardęgówko, Wardęgowo, Wielka Wólka, Wonna and Zawada.

== Neighbouring gminas ==
Gmina Biskupiec is bordered by the gminas of Bratian, Iława, Jabłonowo Pomorskie, Kisielice, Kurzętnik, Łasin, Świecie nad Osą and Zbiczno.
