= Aleksandr Sumin =

Russian footballer

Personal information
- Full name: Aleksandr Ilyich Sumin
- Date of birth: 2 June 1995 (age 31)
- Place of birth: Moscow, Russia
- Height: 1.82 m (5 ft 11 1/2 in)
- Position: Defender

Senior career*
Years	Team	Apps	(Gls)
2014	FC Chertanovo Moscow	1	(0)
2015–2016	FC Sibir-2 Novosibirsk	19	(0)
2017–2018	FC Sibir-M Novosibirsk		
2018–2019	FC Sibir-2 Novosibirsk	19	(0)
- * Club domestic league appearances and goals

Aleksandr Ilyich Sumin (Russian: Александр Ильич Сумин; born 2 June 1995) is a Russian former football player.

== Club career ==
He made his professional debut in the Russian Professional Football League for FC Chertanovo Moscow on 16 August 2014 in a game against FC Dynamo Bryansk.

Sumin made a single appearances for Russian National Football League side FC Sibir Novosibirsk during the 2018–19 Russian Cup.
