= Biskupiec, Nowe Miasto County =

Biskupiec
- Village
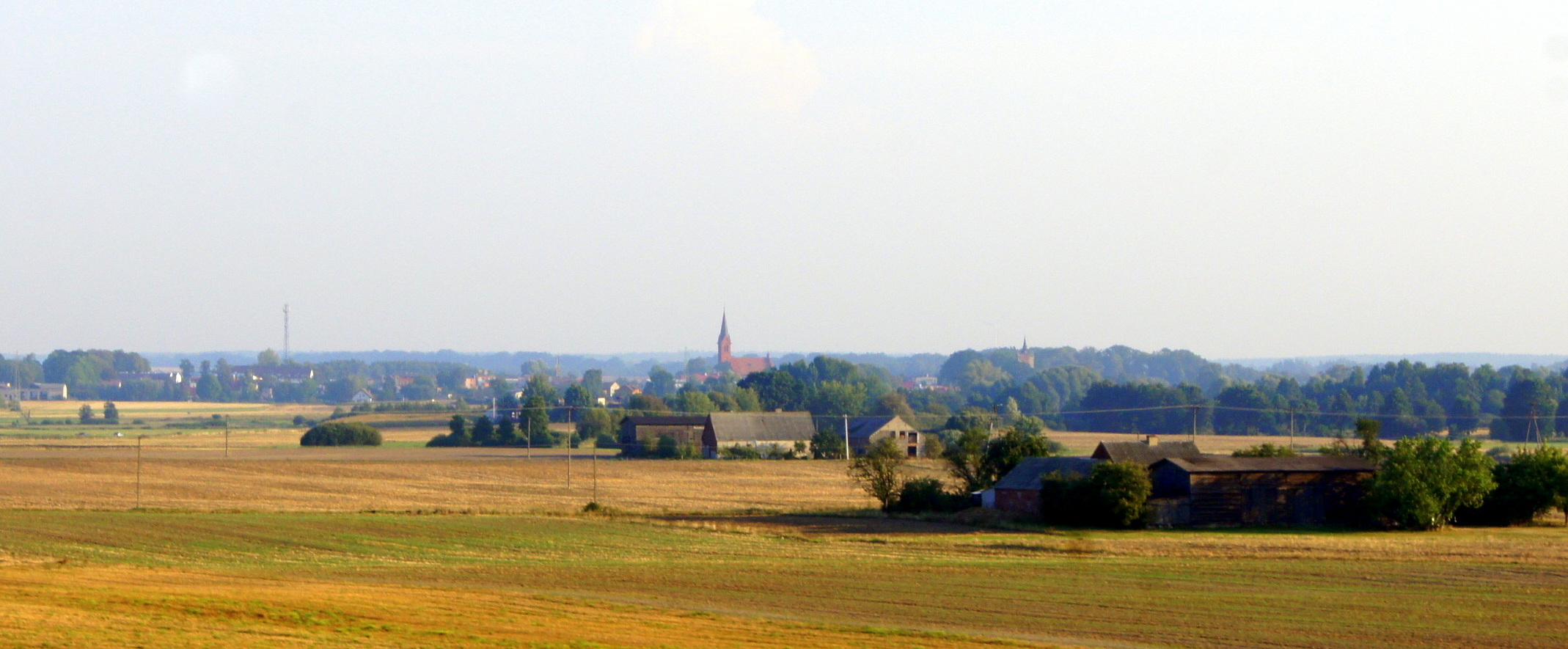
- Panorama view of Biskupiec

- Location within Poland
- Coordinates: 53°30′2″N 19°21′2″E
- Country: Poland
- Voivodeship: Warmian-Masurian
- County: Nowe Miasto
- Gmina: Biskupiec
- Population: 1,927
- Time zone: UTC+1 (CET)
  - Summer (DST): UTC+2 (CEST)
- Vehicle registration: NNM

Biskupiec [bisˈkupjɛt͡s] is a village in Nowe Miasto County, Warmian-Masurian Voivodeship, in northern Poland. It is the seat of the gmina (administrative district) called Gmina Biskupiec.

Biskupiec was a town from 1331 to 1946, when it lost its town rights due to heavy devastation during World War II. Preserved heritage sights include the Saint John of Nepomuk and Our Lady of the Rosary church and the Gmina Office.

== Notable people ==
- Czesław Michniewicz (born 1970), Polish football coach, grew up in Biskupiec
