= Motor Enthusiasts Club =

Motor club based in Dublin, Ireland

Motor Enthusiasts' Club (MEC)
- Abbreviation: MEC
- Formation: 1957; 69 years ago
- Type: Motor Club
- Headquarters: Dublin
- Members: open
- Board of directors: 11 directors
- Affiliations: Motorsport Ireland; Motorcycling Ireland
- Website: www.mec.ie

Motor Enthusiasts' Club (MEC) is a motor club based in Dublin, Ireland.

== History ==
The club was set up in 1957 and some of the original members are still involved. Two of MEC's past directors have held the position of president of Motorsport Ireland. As of 2019, four current club members are representatives in the Motorsport Council, the biggest representation of any club.

In 2015, MEC won the Dick Bailey Award for the best run event in the opinion of the registered competitors for the second year in a row.

Long time member Frank Nuttall has been awarded the Jimmy Millard trophy by Motorsport Ireland for his contribution to Motorsport in Ireland over several decades.

In March 2019, in the run-up to 2020 event application, MEC issued open letter via Facebook, urging more and younger members to participate in the club events.

== Events ==
MEC organise and run a number of motorsport events in both motorbike and car disciplines:

- Sporting Trials (MEC Mudplug Championship)
- Autotests
- Track Racing
- Hillclimb/Sprints
- Rally Sprints
- Motorcycle Trials

In the past MEC also ran:

- Rallies
- Circuit Racing
- Autocross
- 4×4 Trials

MEC members participated in the above events, as well as Classic, Enduro, Formula Libre, Formula Vee, Grasstrack, GT, Motocross, Rallycross events organized by other clubs.

=== Notable events ===
In 2019 MEC ran Mondello Park Race Meeting on 8–9 June.

MEC ran annual Mondello Park Rallysprint event at the beginning of December for over a decade. The 2016 and 2017 events were cancelled as participant numbers were too low to go ahead. The event was removed from the calendar since then.

In 1995, MEC hosted a round of The World Trials Championship on the Sugarloaf in County Wicklow.
