= Soo-min =

- Hangul: 수민
- RR: Sumin
- MR: Sumin

Soo-min, also spelled Su-min, is a Korean given name.

People with this name include:

- Choi Soo-min (born 1981), retired South Korean female swimmer
- Choi Su-min (born 1990), South Korean women's handball player
- Lee Soo-min (golfer) (born 1993), South Korean male golfer
- Jo Soo-min (born 1999), South Korean actress
- Lee Soo-min (actress, born 2001) (born 2001), South Korean actress
- Kim Soo-min (born 2007), South Korean singer, member of girl group TripleS

Fictional characters with this name include:

- Chae Su-min, in 2004 South Korean television series April Kiss
- Lee Su-min, in 2006 South Korean film No Regret
- Jung Soo-min, in 2013 South Korean television series Iris II
- Yoon Soo-min, in 2013 South Korean television series Cruel City
- Jung Soo-min, in South Korean television series, web novel and webtoon Marry My Husband

== See also ==
- List of Korean given names
