= Nowe Miasto County =

Nowe Miasto County Powiat nowomiejski
- County
- Coat of arms

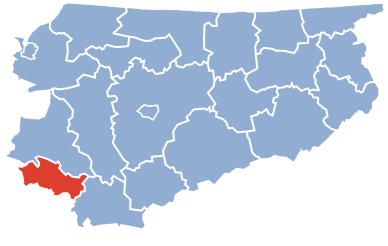
- Location within the voivodeship

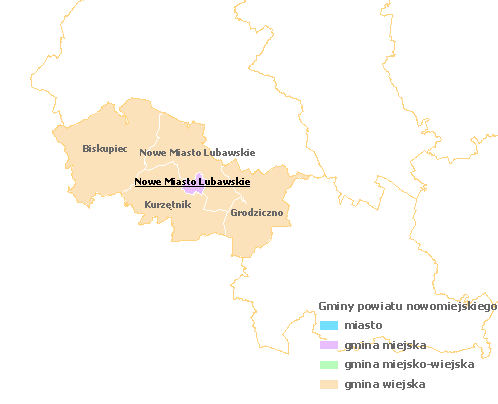
- Division into gminas
- Coordinates (Nowe Miasto Lubawskie): 53°25′N 19°35′E
- Country: Poland
- Voivodeship: Warmian-Masurian
- Seat: Nowe Miasto Lubawskie
- Gminas: Total 5 (incl. 1 urban): Nowe Miasto Lubawskie; Gmina Bratian; Gmina Biskupiec; Gmina Grodziczno; Gmina Kurzętnik

Area
  - Total: 695.01 km^{2} (268.34 sq mi)

Population (2023)
  - Total: 41,964
  - Density: 60.379/km^{2} (156.38/sq mi)
  - Urban: 10,089
  - Rural: 31,875
- Car plates: NNM
- Website: www.powiat-nowomiejski.pl

Nowe Miasto County (Polish: powiat nowomiejski) is a unit of territorial administration and local government (powiat) in Warmian-Masurian Voivodeship, northern Poland. It came into being on January 1, 1999, as a result of the Polish local government reforms passed in 1998. Its administrative seat and only town is Nowe Miasto Lubawskie, which lies 73 kilometres (45 mi) south-west of the regional capital Olsztyn.

The county covers an area of 695.01 square kilometres (268.3 sq mi). As of December 2023 its total population is 41,964, out of which the population of Nowe Miasto Lubawskie is 10,089 and the rural population is 31,875.

== Neighbouring counties ==
Nowe Miasto County is bordered by Iława County to the north, Działdowo County to the east, Brodnica County to the south and Grudziądz County to the west.

== Administrative division ==
The county is subdivided into five gminas (one urban and four rural). These are listed in the following table, in descending order of population.

| Gmina | Type | Area (km^{2}) | Population (2006) | Seat |
|---|---|---|---|---|
| Nowe Miasto Lubawskie | urban | 11.6 | 11,036 | |
| Gmina Bratian | rural | 138.0 | 7,859 | Mszanowo |
| Gmina Biskupiec | rural | 241.3 | 9,652 | Biskupiec |
| Gmina Kurzętnik | rural | 149.9 | 8,646 | Kurzętnik |
| Gmina Grodziczno | rural | 154.3 | 6,195 | Grodziczno |
