= Paweł Jan Działyński =

Polish noble

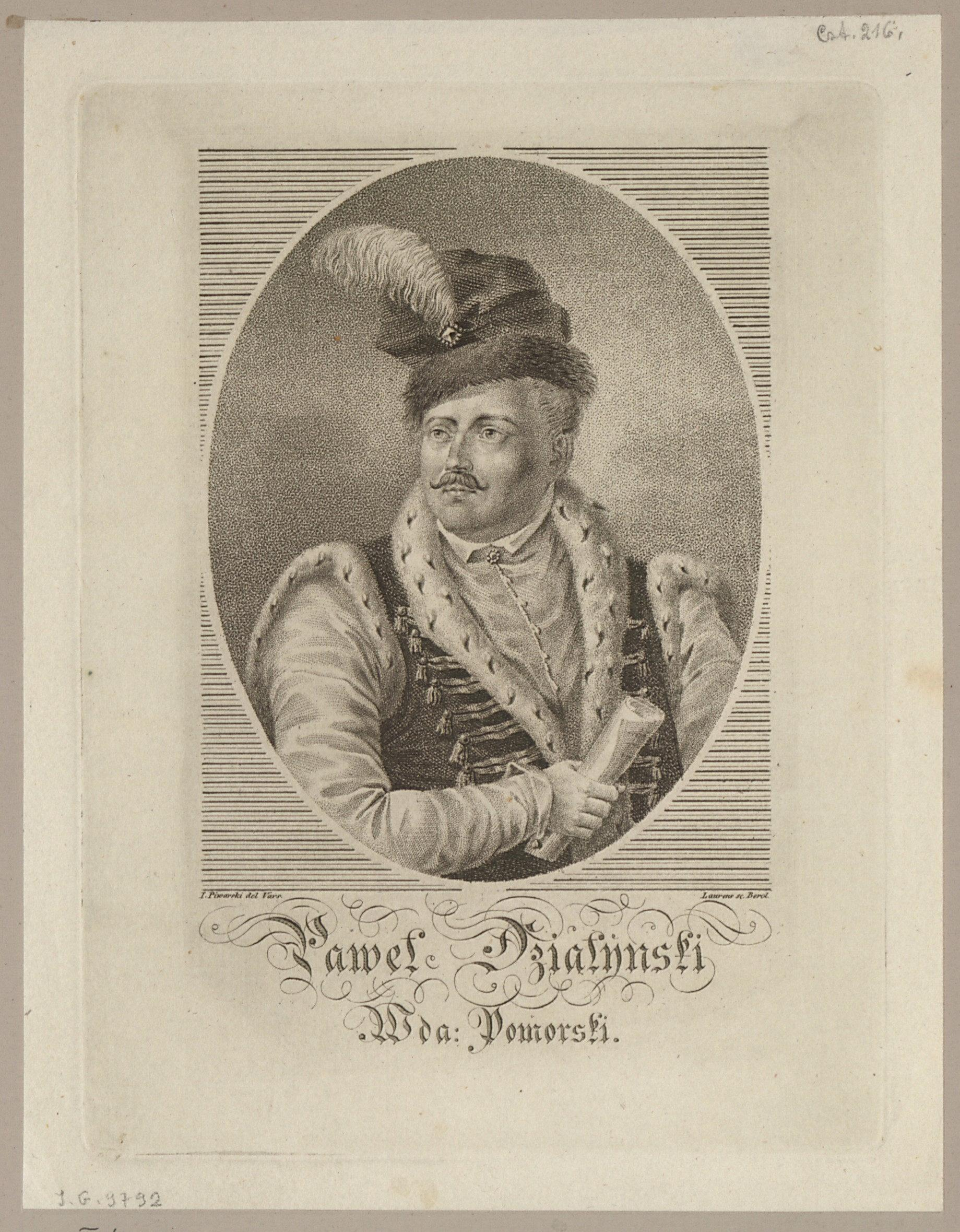
A copper engraving of either Paweł Jan Działyński (d. 1643) or Paweł Działyński (d. 1609).

Paweł Jan Działyński (1594–1643) was a voivode of Pomerania from 1630 to 1643. He succeeded Samuel Konarski, and was himself followed by Gerhard Dönhoff, a member of the Dönhoff family.

== Biography ==
Działyński was the son of Mikołaj Działyński and Katarzyna Dulska. He married Jadwiga Czarnkowska, with whom he had daughters Katarzyna and Jadwiga and sons Adam, Jan, and Kazimierz.

He was educated at the Jesuit College in Poznań, and in Padua.

He became the starosta of Bratiańsk in 1613 with the permission of the King of Poland. He was also starost of Jasieniec, Kowal and Skarszewy. Between 1604 and 1613 he was the delegate of regional szlachta of Chełm to the Polish Sejm.

From 1630 on he was the under treasury of Prussia. He was nominated as the voivode of Pomerania on 16 May 1630.

Between 1637 and 1638 he mediated the conflict between Gdańsk and king Władysław IV Vasa over the share of tariffs taken at the port that was reserved for the Polish–Lithuanian Commonwealth.

He was known for his fervent opposition to the Protestant Reformation; in 1624 he founded an order of Franciscan friars in Nowe Miasto, despite protests from local Lutherans, and built churches there and in Łąki Bratiańskie.

He died on 17 July 1643 in Bratian and was buried in Nowe Miasto Lubawskie in the basilica crypt. His wife commissioned a funerary banner in his honor, which was stabilized via preservation in 1999; a full restoration began in 2024 at the Arkona Conservation Workshop in Krakow.

In 1795, Stanisław August Poniatowski chose 20 figures from Polish history to honor with bronze busts, to be displayed at the Warsaw Castle. Some confusion at the time of creation makes it unclear whether he or Paweł Działyński is represented; despite efforts of art historians, it's unclear whether any portrait can be clearly said to be Pawel or Pawel Jan. The bust is in the Knights Hall at the Royal Castle, Warsaw, and is viewable online. The date of death on the bust is 1642; Paweł Jan died in 1643 and Paweł died in 1609.
