= Mszanowo =

- Village
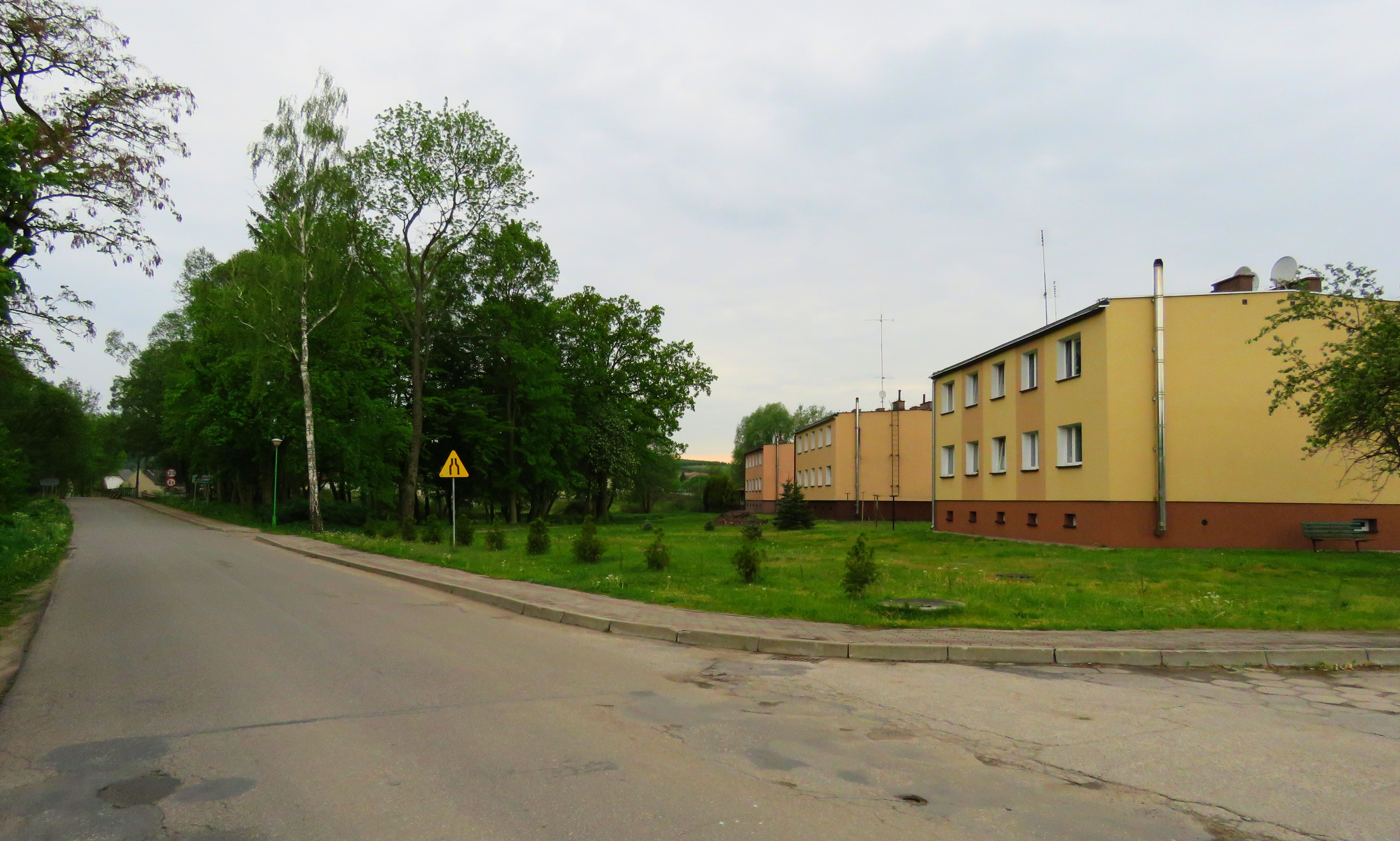

- Location within Poland
- Coordinates: 53°26′N 19°36′E
- Country: Poland
- Voivodeship: Warmian-Masurian
- County: Nowe Miasto
- Gmina: Bratian
- Population: 446

Mszanowo [mʂaˈnɔvɔ] is a village in northern Poland, located in Nowe Miasto County within the Warmian-Masurian Voivodeship, and currently serving as the administrative seat of Gmina Bratian (renamed from Gmina Nowe Miasto Lubawskie effective 1 January 2026).

Situated along the Drwęca River about 2 kilometers northeast of the town of Nowe Miasto Lubawskie, it forms part of a sołectwo (village administrative unit) that includes the nearby settlement of Łąki Bratiańskie and has approximately 446 residents in the village proper, contributing to a total sołectwo population of 640.

== History ==
Historically, Mszanowo was first documented in 1327 under the name "Wipsanow," when Bishop Otto of Chełmno granted the lands to Mikołaj z Tylic between his existing estate and the Drwęca and Weł rivers. The village changed hands over the centuries, passing to Bishop Tideman in 1546 and returning to the Chełmno chapter in 1554 under Bishop Jan Lubodzieski.

The adjacent Łąki Bratiańskie, first noted around 1400, developed as a significant religious site with a chapel built by Bratian vogt Filip von Kleeberg, possibly on a pre-Christian pagan worship location dedicated to the goddess Majuma.

In the 17th century, following destruction by invading forces, a Reformati monastery and church dedicated to the Assumption of the Virgin Mary were established there in 1631, housing a miraculous statue of the Virgin Mary that drew pilgrims and earned the area the nickname "West Prussian Częstochowa."

The statue's coronation was approved by Pope Benedict XIV in 1750 and performed in 1752, but the monastery was dissolved by Prussian authorities in 1875, and a fire in 1882 destroyed the buildings; the statue was relocated to the parish church in Nowe Miasto Lubawskie, where it remains a focal point for local devotion.

== Sport and Leisure ==
Mszanowo houses a small football stadium which is home to the "Młode Lwy" football club and academy.
