= Gmina Bratian =

Gmina Bratian Bratian Commune
- Gmina
- Coat of arms
- Interactive map of Gmina Bratian
- Coordinates (Mszanowo): 53°26′N 19°36′E
- Country: Poland
- Voivodeship: Warmian-Masurian
- County: Nowe Miasto
- Seat: Mszanowo

Area
  - Total: 138.02 km^{2} (53.29 sq mi)

Population (2011)
  - Total: 8,053
  - Density: 58.35/km^{2} (151.1/sq mi)
- Website: http://www.gnmiasto.rubikon.net.pl

Gmina Bratian is a rural gmina (administrative district) in Nowe Miasto County, Warmian-Masurian Voivodeship, in northern Poland. Its seat is the village of Mszanowo, which lies approximately 3 kilometres (2 mi) north-east of Nowe Miasto Lubawskie and 72 km (45 mi) south-west of the regional capital Olsztyn.

Between 1973 and 2025, the gmina was known as Gmina Nowe Miasto Lubawskie. The gmina changed its name from Nowe Miasto Lubawskie to Bratian on January 1, 2026. The purpose of the name change was to strengthen the local identity of residents and avoid numerous mistakes, including in deliveries, resulting from the existence of two municipalities with the same name in the county (the second was the urban gmina of Nowe Miasto Lubawskie). Bratian, as the largest village in the rural municipality, with the largest primary school, kindergarten, library, and market hall, is expected to increase the recognition and attractiveness of the local government compared to others.

The gmina covers an area of 138.02 square kilometres (53.3 sq mi), and as of 2011 its total population is 8,053.

== Villages ==
Gmina Bratian contains the villages and settlements of Bagno, Bratian, Chrośle, Gryźliny, Gwiździny, Jamielnik, Kaczek, Łąki Bratiańskie, Lekarty, Mszanowo, Nawra, Nowy Dwór Bratiański, Pacółtowo, Pustki, Radomno, Skarlin and Tylice.

== Neighbouring gminas ==
Gmina Bratian is bordered by the town of Nowe Miasto Lubawskie and by the gminas of Biskupiec, Grodziczno, Iława, Kurzętnik and Lubawa.
