= Nawra, Warmian-Masurian Voivodeship =

Nawra
- Village
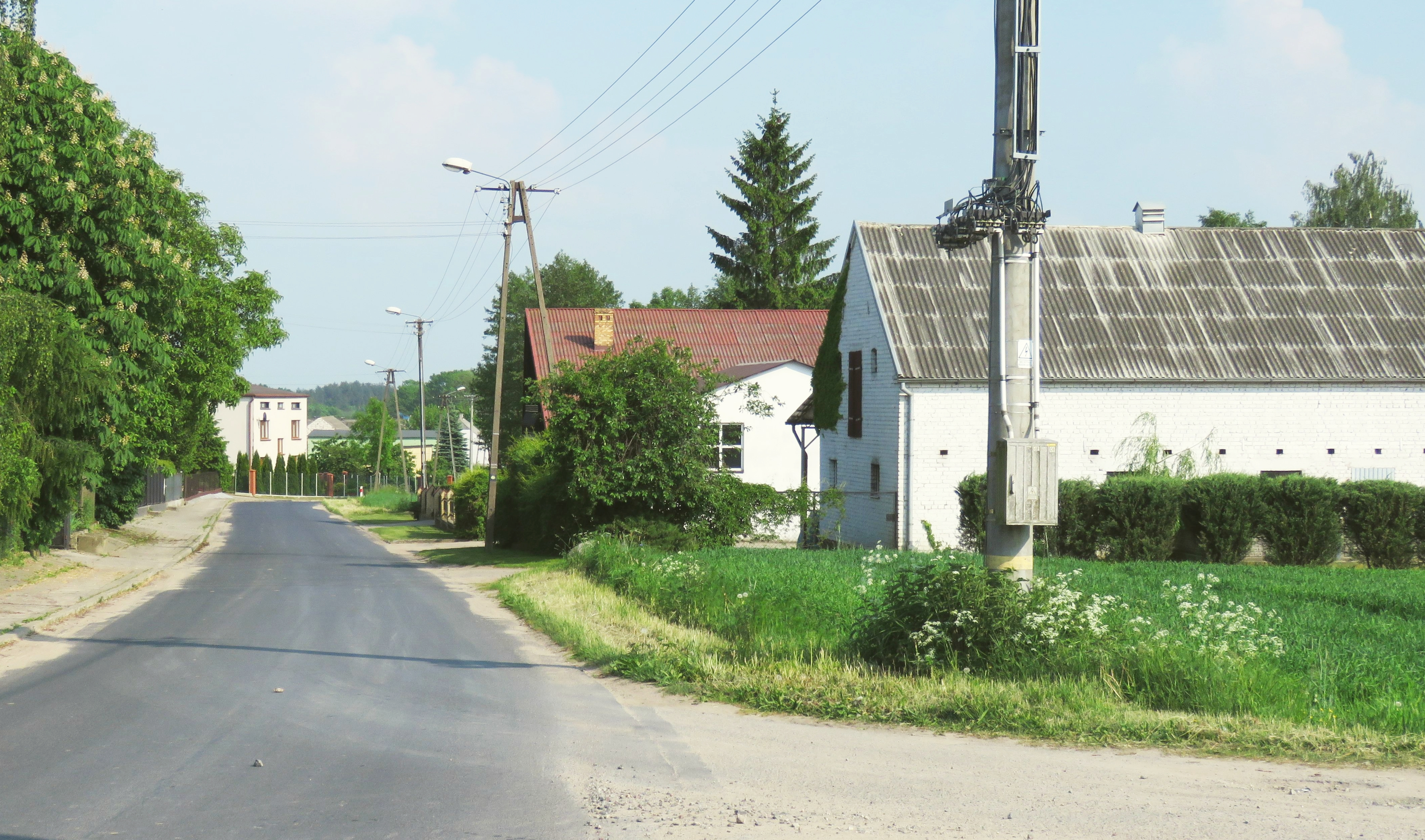

- Location within Poland
- Coordinates: 53°27′N 19°34′E
- Country: Poland
- Voivodeship: Warmian-Masurian
- County: Nowe Miasto
- Gmina: Bratian
- Time zone: UTC+1 (CET)
  - Summer (DST): UTC+2 (CEST)
- Vehicle registration: NNM

Nawra [ˈnavra] is a village in the administrative district of Gmina Bratian, within Nowe Miasto County, Warmian-Masurian Voivodeship, in northern Poland.

== History ==
According to the 1921 census, the village had a population of 421, 99.8% Polish.

During the German occupation of Poland (World War II), the local forest was the site of a massacre of over 150 Poles from the nearby town of Nowe Miasto Lubawskie and other nearby villages, carried out by the Germans in 1939 as part of the Intelligenzaktion.
