= Jamielnik, Nowe Miasto County =

Jamielnik
- Village
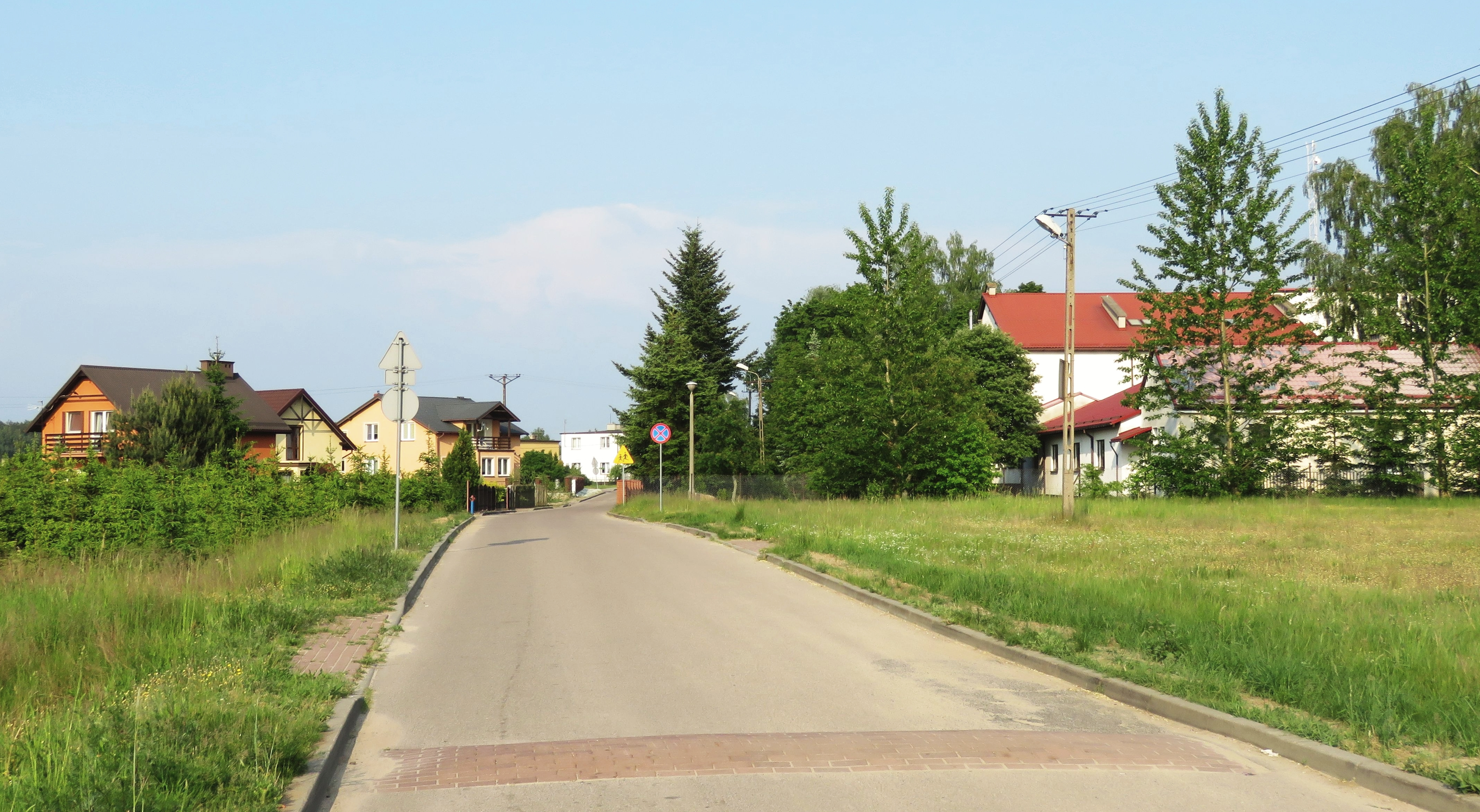

- Location within Poland
- Coordinates: 53°32′N 19°31′E
- Country: Poland
- Voivodeship: Warmian-Masurian
- County: Nowe Miasto
- Gmina: Bratian
- Population (approx.): 1,000

Jamielnik [jaˈmjɛlnik] is a village in the administrative district of Gmina Bratian, within Nowe Miasto County, Warmian-Masurian Voivodeship, in northern Poland.
