= Gryźliny, Nowe Miasto County =

Gryźliny
- Village
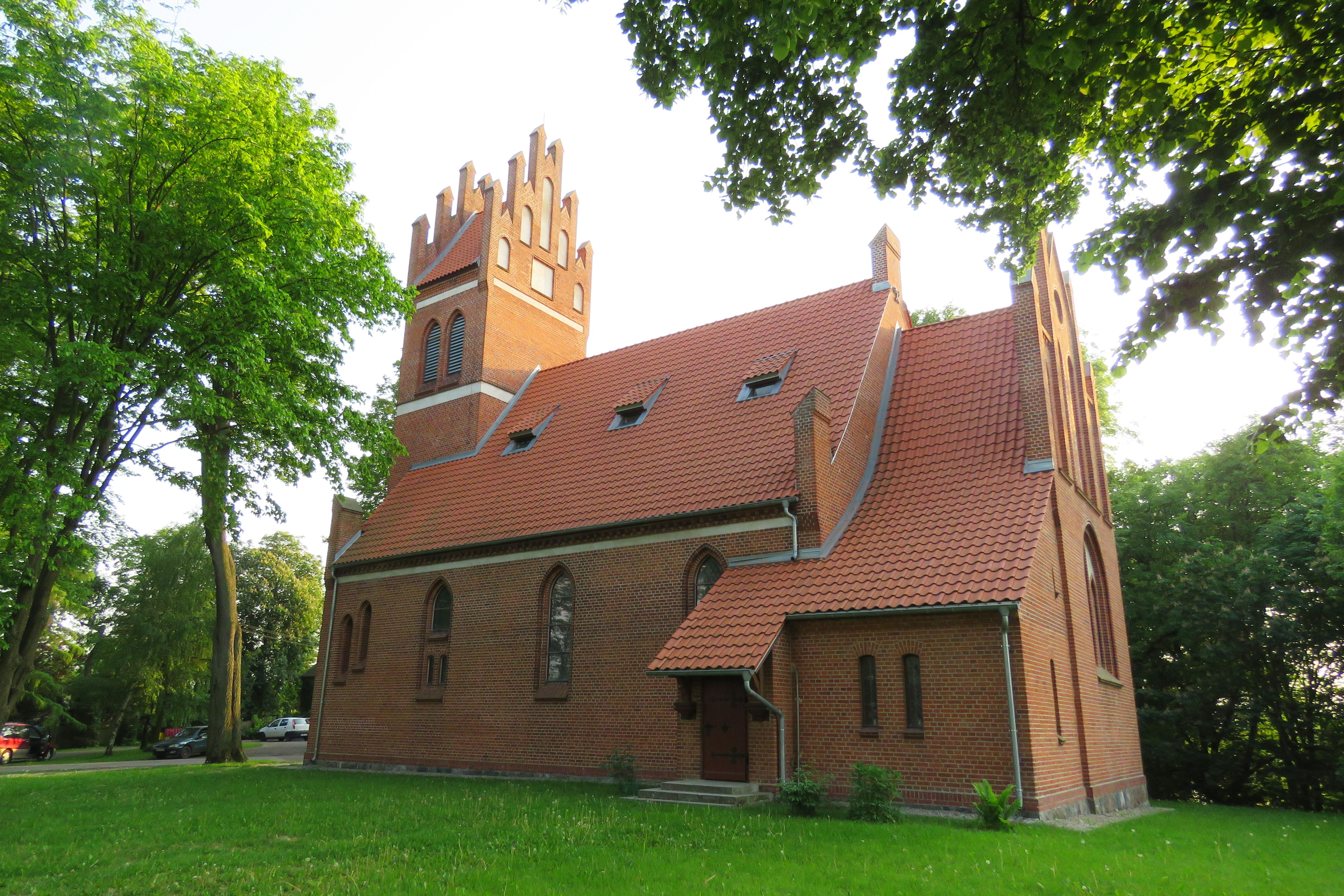

- Location within Poland
- Coordinates: 53°30′N 19°32′E
- Country: Poland
- Voivodeship: Warmian-Masurian
- County: Nowe Miasto
- Gmina: Bratian

Gryźliny [ɡrɨˈʑlinɨ] is a village in the administrative district of Gmina Bratian, within Nowe Miasto County, Warmian-Masurian Voivodeship, in northern Poland.
