= Tylice, Warmian-Masurian Voivodeship =

Tylice
- Village
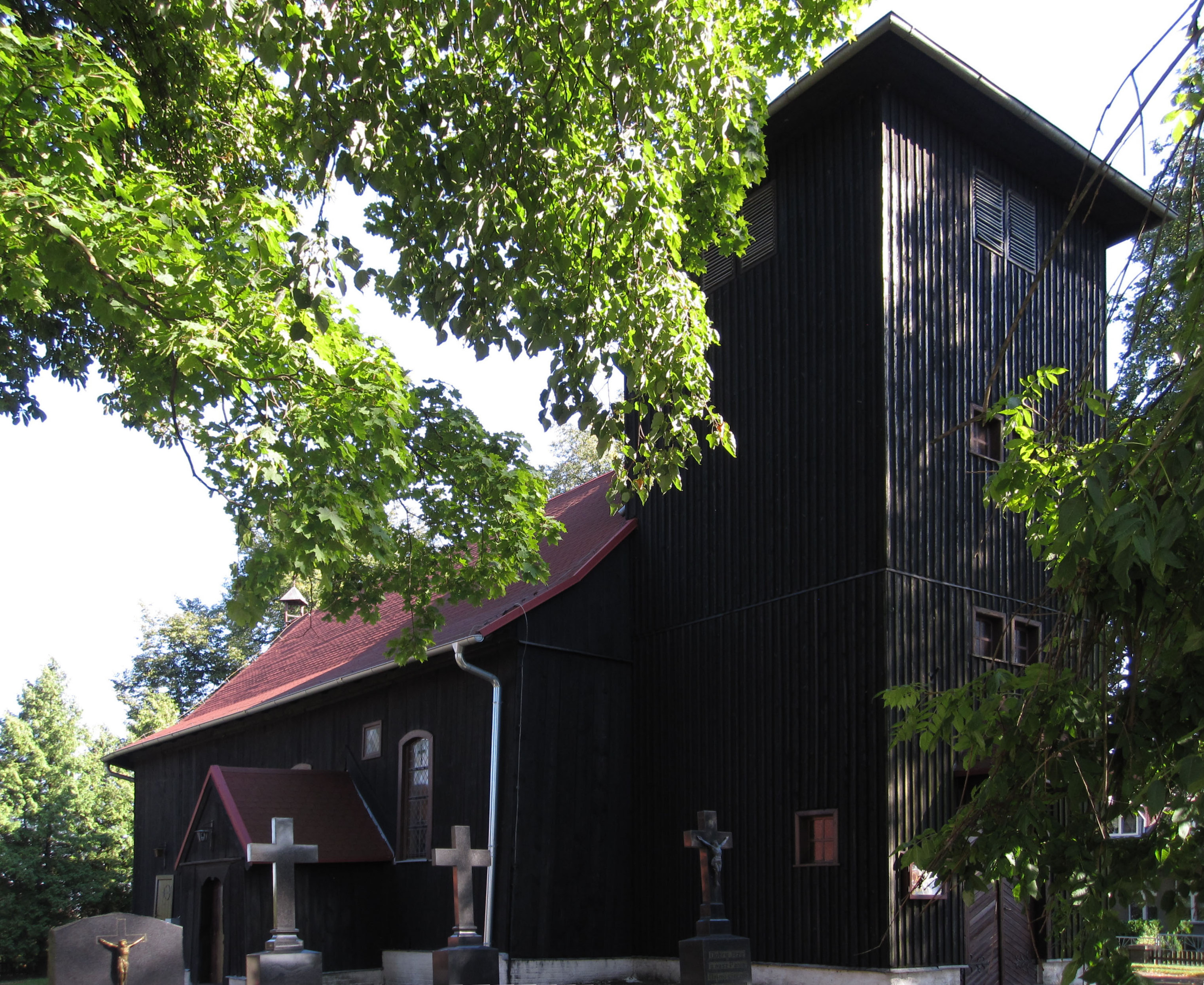
- Saint Michael Archangel church in Tylice

- Location within Poland
- Coordinates: 53°26′N 19°40′E
- Country: Poland
- Voivodeship: Warmian-Masurian
- County: Nowe Miasto
- Gmina: Bratian

Tylice [tɨˈlit͡sɛ] is a village in the administrative district of Gmina Bratian, within Nowe Miasto County, Warmian-Masurian Voivodeship, in northern Poland.
