= Radomno =

- Village
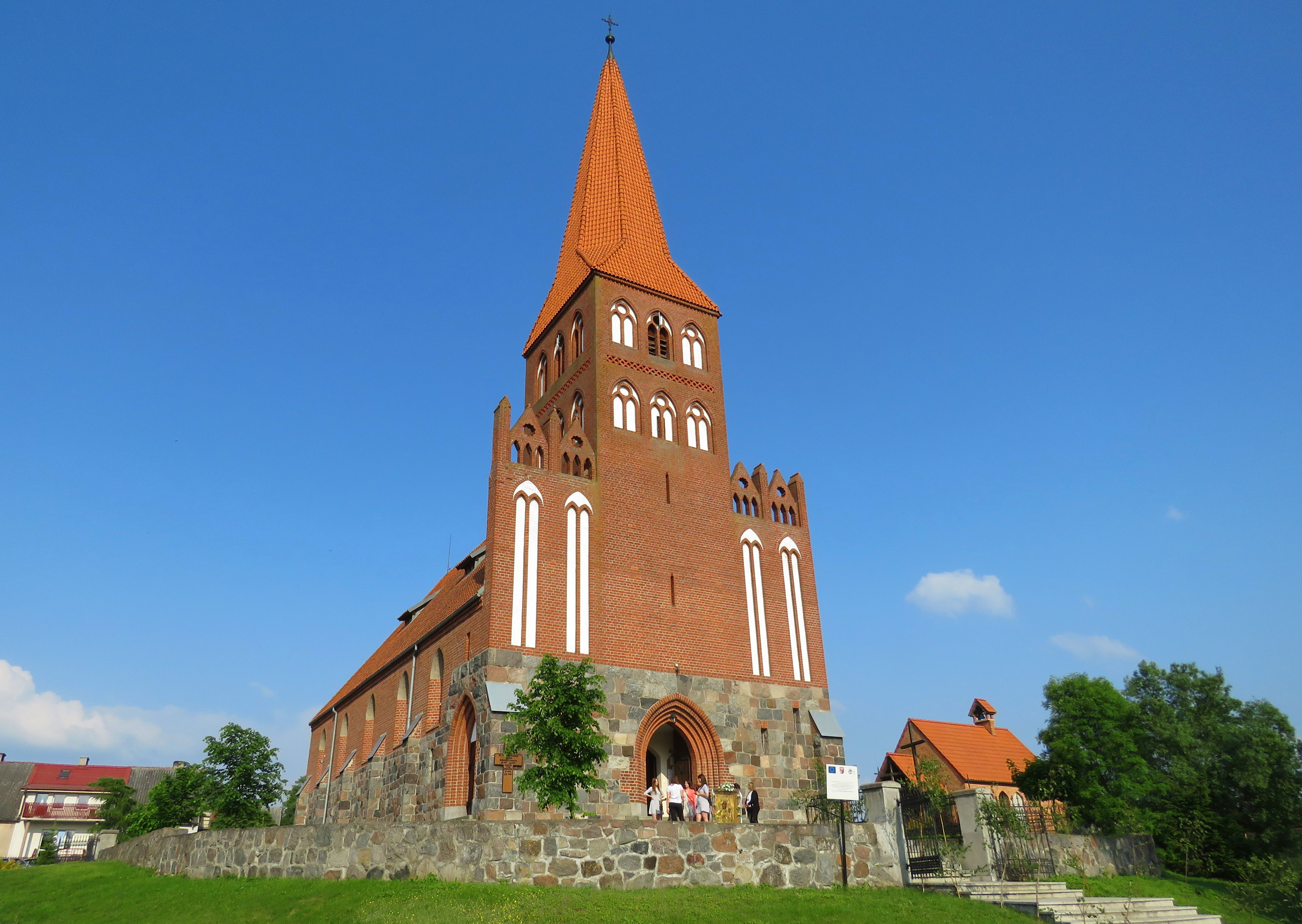

- Location within Poland
- Coordinates: 53°31′N 19°34′E
- Country: Poland
- Voivodeship: Warmian-Masurian
- County: Nowe Miasto
- Gmina: Bratian
- Population: 520

Radomno [raˈdɔmnɔ] is a village in the administrative district of Gmina Bratian, within Nowe Miasto County, Warmian-Masurian Voivodeship, in northern Poland.

== Notable residents ==
- Frederick Philip Grove (1879–1948) German-born Canadian novelist and translator
