= Paweł Działyński =

Polish courtier and official (1560–1609)

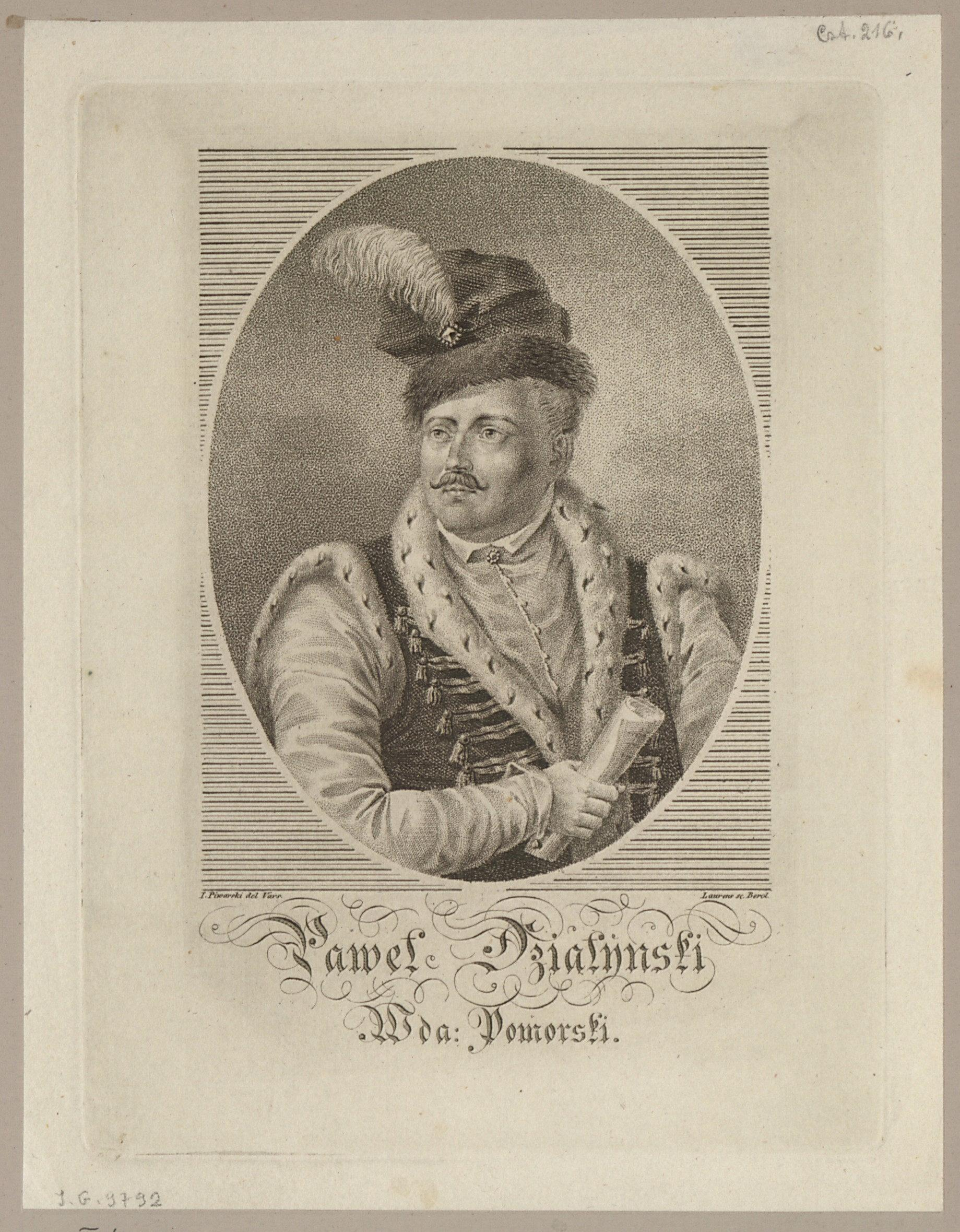
A copper engraving of either Paweł or Paweł Jan Działyński.

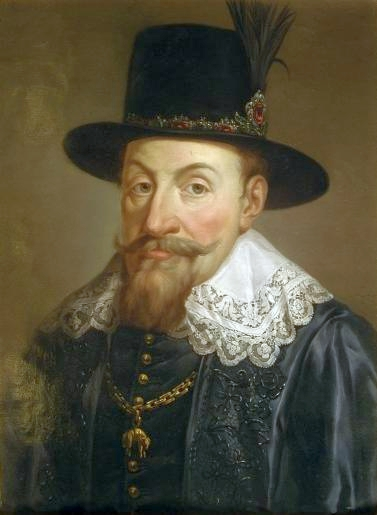
Sigismund III

Paweł Działyński (Latin: Paulus Dzialinski; born 1560 – died 1609) of Ogończyk coat of arms, son of Paweł and Krystyna Kostczanka, was a Polish courtier, royal secretary, ambassador and starost (governor) of Bobrowniki, Radziejów and Radzyń. He may have been related to Vice Chancellor Piotr Tylicki.

In 1597 he was sent by Sigismund III Vasa of Poland-Lithuania to Holland and England, both at war with Spain, to protest the seizing of ships transporting goods between Poland and Spain. His style was provocative in both countries, including at a meeting with Queen Elizabeth where she rebuked him in Latin for his disrespect and what she considered his misunderstanding of the laws of war. As a result of Działyński's appearance in England, George Carew was sent to Poland to resolve the shipping issue, which resulted in some compromises by both sides.

Działyński's reputation in Poland was not harmed by his embassy. It was subsequent to the visit that he was promoted to starost of Radzyń, and in 1781 a bronze bust was commissioned by Polish King Stanisław August Poniatowski of him and several other distinguished figures from Polish history; however some confusion at the time of creation makes it unclear whether he or Paweł Jan Działyński is represented. The bust is in the Knights Hall at the Royal Castle, Warsaw, and is viewable online.

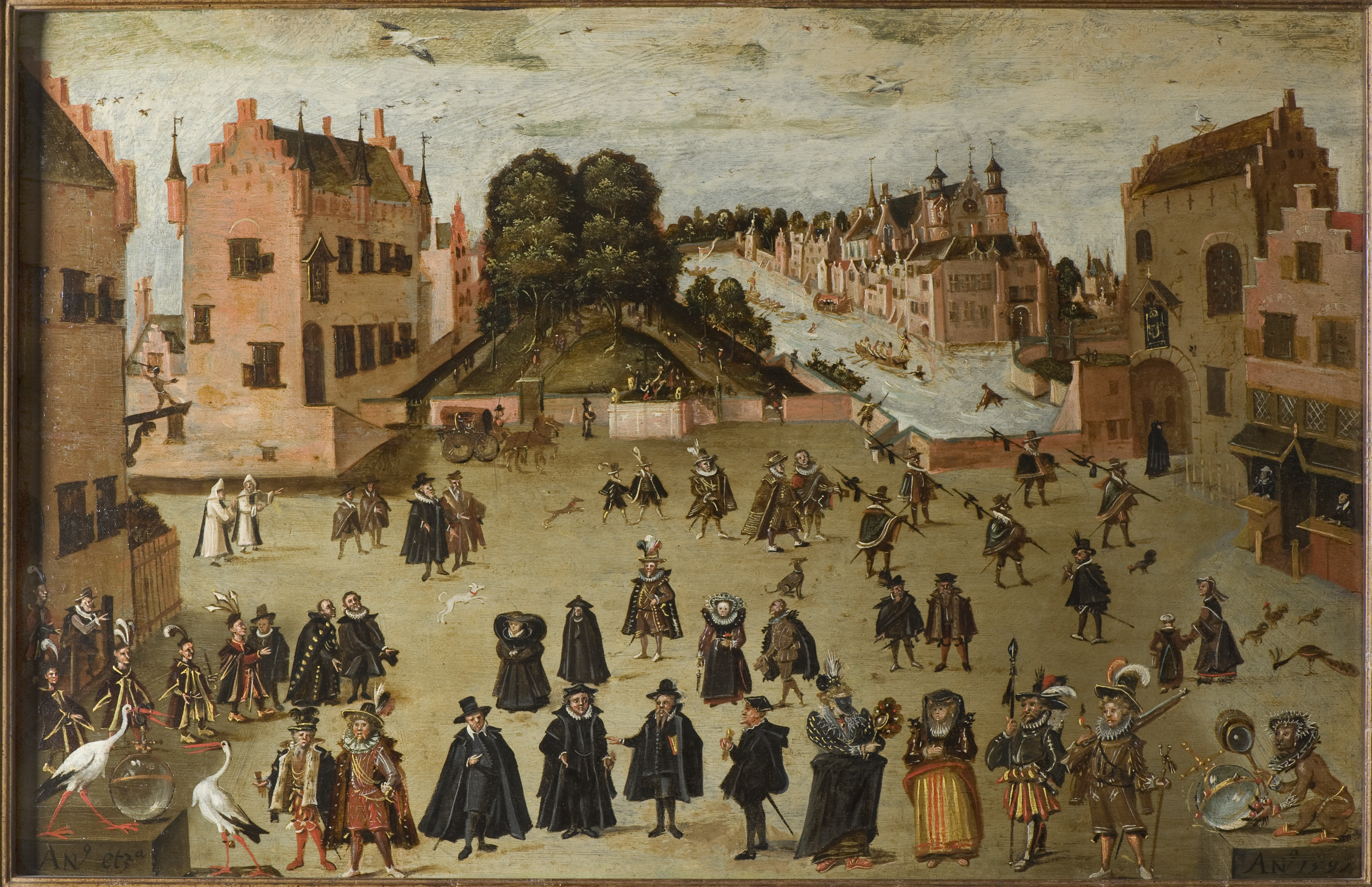
An anonymous painting from 1597 shows the Polish embassy, including Paweł Działyński, in the Hague.

An anonymous Dutch painting, owned by the Hague Historical Museum and currently displayed at the Polish Embassy, De Plaats te Den Haag, gezien naar de Hofvijver (1597) shows a group of figures wearing Polish garments, presumably including Działyński, among other figures notable in the political and religious life of the city at the time.

== Inspiration ==
It is possible that the character Polonius from Shakespeare's Hamlet was inspired by the Działyński affair, as a play on the name of his home country.
