= Skarlin =

- Village
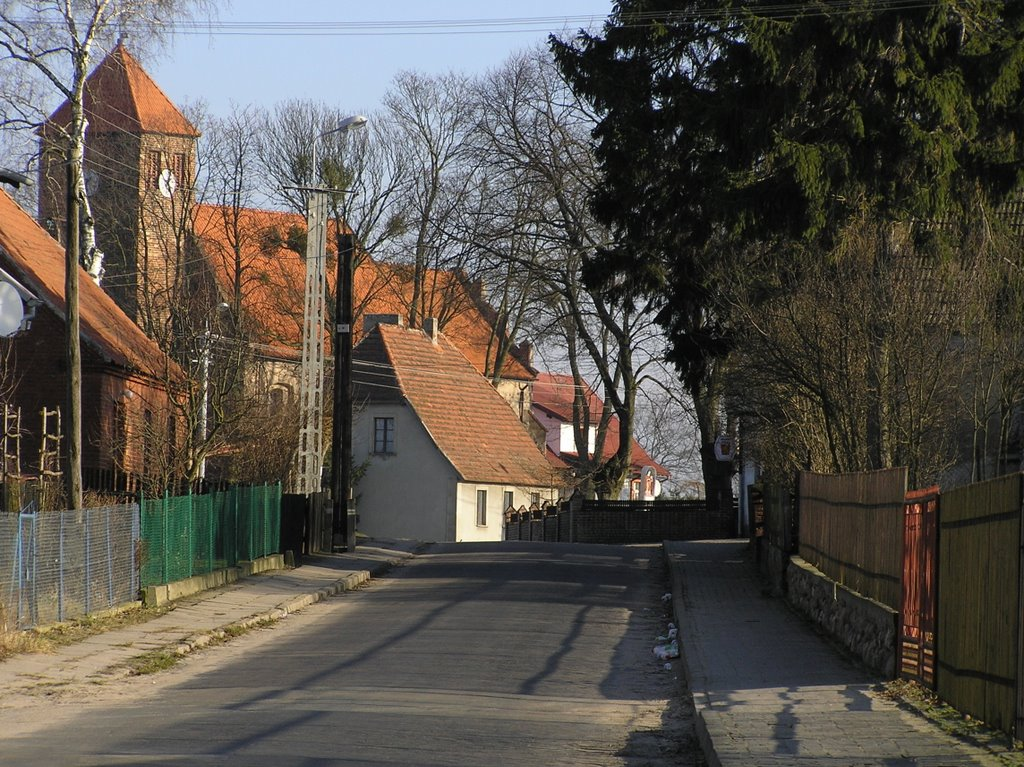

- Location within Poland
- Coordinates: 53°28′N 19°28′E
- Country: Poland
- Voivodeship: Warmian-Masurian
- County: Nowe Miasto
- Gmina: Bratian

Skarlin [ˈskarlin] is a village in the administrative district of Gmina Bratian, within Nowe Miasto County, Warmian-Masurian Voivodeship, in northern Poland.
