= Pacółtowo, Nowe Miasto County =

Pacółtowo
- Village
- Location within Poland
- Coordinates: 53°25′13″N 19°37′32″E
- Country: Poland
- Voivodeship: Warmian-Masurian
- County: Nowe Miasto
- Gmina: Bratian
- Population: 558

Pacółtowo [pat͡suu̯ˈtɔvɔ] is a village in the administrative district of Gmina Bratian, within Nowe Miasto County, Warmian-Masurian Voivodeship, in northern Poland.
