= Pustki, Warmian-Masurian Voivodeship =

Pustki
- Village
- Location within Poland
- Coordinates: 53°30′06″N 19°36′26″E
- Country: Poland
- Voivodeship: Warmian-Masurian
- County: Nowe Miasto
- Gmina: Bratian

Pustki [ˈpustki] is a village in the administrative district of Gmina Bratian, within Nowe Miasto County, Warmian-Masurian Voivodeship, in northern Poland.
