= Wiesław Lendzion =

Polish footballer and manager

Personal information
- Full name: Wiesław Maksymilian Lendzion
- Date of birth: 10 February 1939 (age 87)
- Place of birth: Nowe Miasto Lubawskie, Poland
- Position: Forward

Senior career*
Years	Team	Apps	(Gls)
1959–1961	Huragan Morąg		
1961–1965	Warmia Olsztyn		
1965–1973	Wisła Kraków	182	(25)
1974–1976	Cracovia		

Managerial career
- 1981–1982: Wisła Kraków
- * Club domestic league appearances and goals

Wiesław Lendzion (born 10 February 1939) is a Polish former football player and manager who played and coached in the Ekstraklasa.

== Career ==
A forward, Lendzion began playing football with Huraganie Morąg in 1959. In 1961, he signed with Warmia Olsztyn where he spent four seasons. In 1965, he signed with Wisła Kraków where he played a total of 182 matches and recorded 25 goals. In 1974, he signed with rivals KS Cracovia. In 1981, he briefly coached Wisla Kraków for a season. He would return to Warmia to coach the club's youth teams.
