= Marek Ochlak =

Roman Catholic Bishop of Fenoarivo Atsinanana

The Most Reverend Marek Ochlak
- Bishop of Fenoarivo Atsinanana
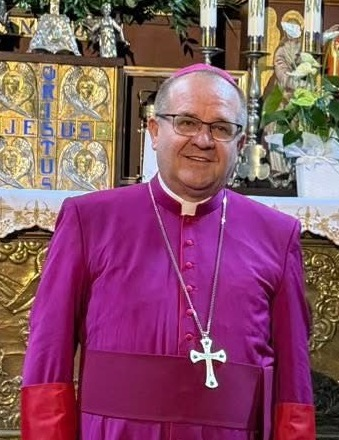
- Church: Roman Catholic Church
- Diocese: Roman Catholic Diocese of Fenoarivo Atsinanana
- Appointed: 17 April 2025
- Predecessor: Marcellin Randriamamonjy

Orders
- Ordination: 20 June 1992 by Zdzisław Fortuniak
- Consecration: 6 July 2025 by Tomasz Grysa

Personal details
- Born: 14 March 1966 (age 60) Nowe Miasto Lubawskie, Poland
- Motto: Adveniat Regnum Tuum (Thy Kingdom Come)
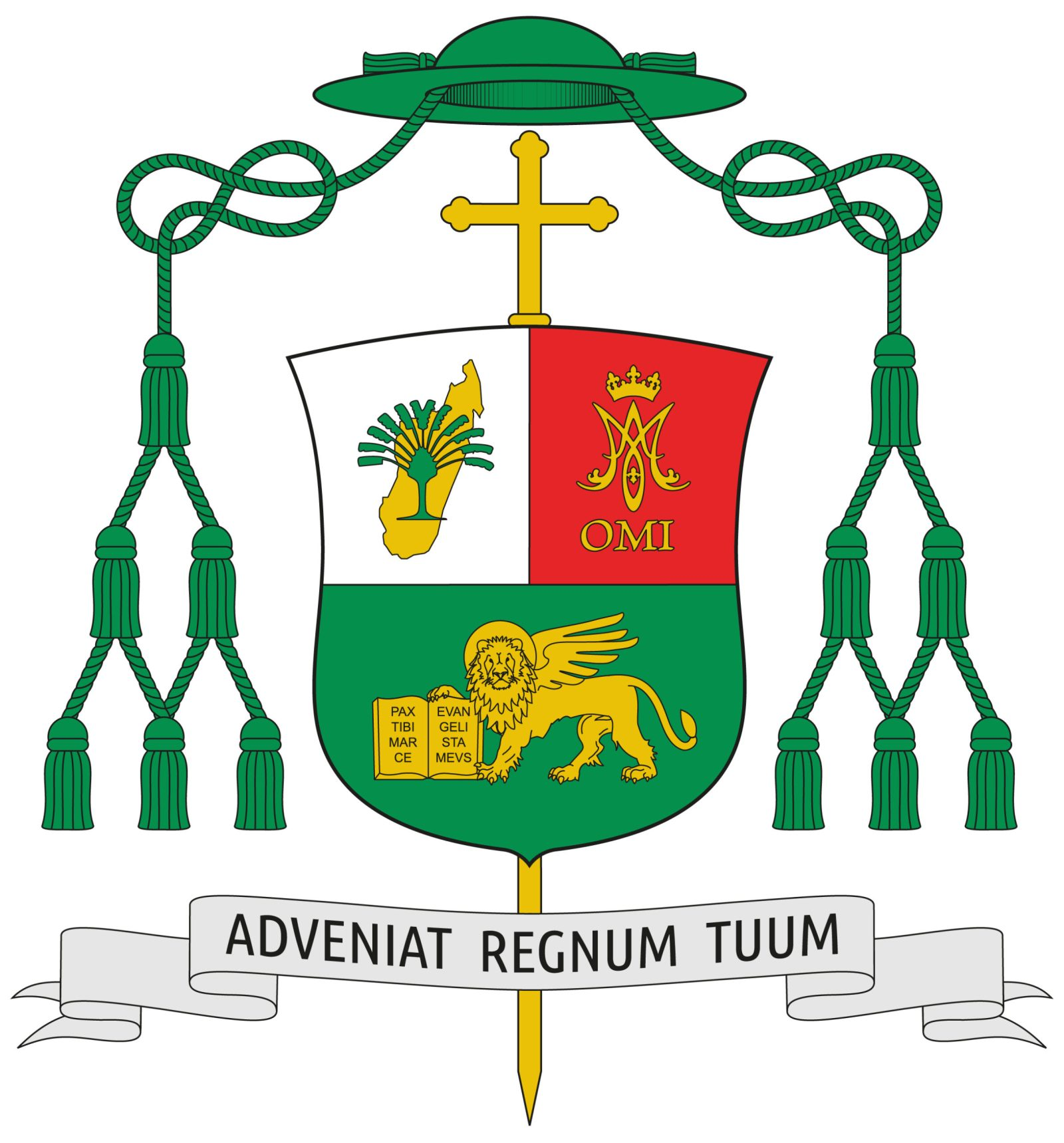
- Coat of arms

Styles of Raimo Goyarrola
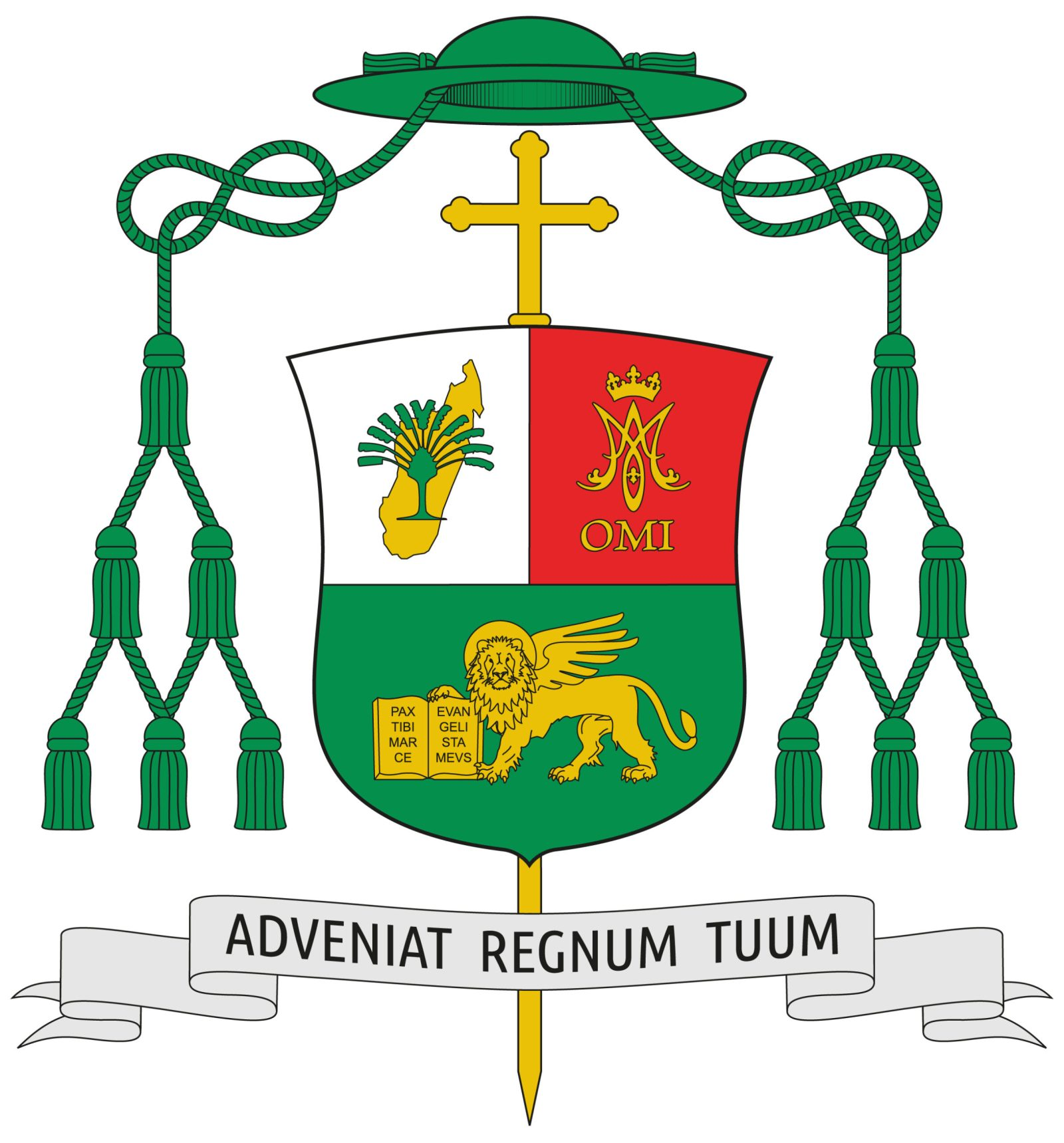
- Reference style: The Most Reverend
- Spoken style: Your Excellency
- Religious style: Monsignor

Marek Ochlak (born 14 March 1966) is a Polish prelate of the Catholic Church who has served as Bishop of Fenoarivo Atsinanana since April 2025.

== Early life and education ==
Ochlak was born in Nowe Miasto Lubawskie on 14 March 1966. From 1981 to 1985, he studied at the Oblate minor seminary in Markowice near Inowrocław. In 1985 he joined the Missionary Oblates of Mary Immaculate and began his novitiate in Kodeń. On 8 September 1986 he made his first religious profession. From 1986 to 1992, he studied philosophy and theology at the Major Seminary of the Missionary Oblates of Mary Immaculate in Obra, where he made his perpetual vows on 8 September 1990. On 15 June 1991, Zdzisław Fortuniak, auxiliary bishop of Poznań, ordained Ochlak a diaconate, and on 20 June 1992, he ordained him a priest.

== Ministry ==
From 1992 to 1994, Ochlak worked as a vicar in the parish of St. Eugene in Kędzierzyn-Koźle. Then he took a French language course in Paris and in August 1995 went to Madagascar. In 1995–1996 he completed a course in Malagasy language and culture in Antananarivo-Soavimbahoace. From 1996 to 2001 he served in Marolambo (from 1999 as superior), from 2001 to 2009 in Toamasina (from 2006 as superior and parish priest), from 2009 to 2015 in Antananarivo-Soavimbahoace (as superior of the Missionary Oblates in Madagascar and Réunion Island), and from 2016 to 2021 on the Befasa mission. He contributed to improving the situation of local communities, among other things, through: He built wells, waterworks, schools, chapels, the Wanda Błeńska Hospital, and renovated the Church of St. Teresa of the Child Jesus in the central mission. In 2021, he returned to Poland, where he assumed the position of director of the Missionary Oblates' Mission Procura in Poznań. In 2023, he was elected superior of the Polish Province of the Missionary Oblates.

On 17 April 2025, Ochlak was appointed by Pope Francis as bishop of Fenoarivo Atsinanana, marking the last episcopal appointment made by him, four days before he died. On 6 July, he was consecrated a bishop by Archbishop Tomasz Grysa at the Oblate Church of St. Joseph in Gdańsk, adopting the words "Adveniat Regnum Tuum" (Thy Kingdom Come) as his episcopal motto. The ingress took place on 10 August 2025, at Sahavola Stadium.
