= Lekarty =

- Village
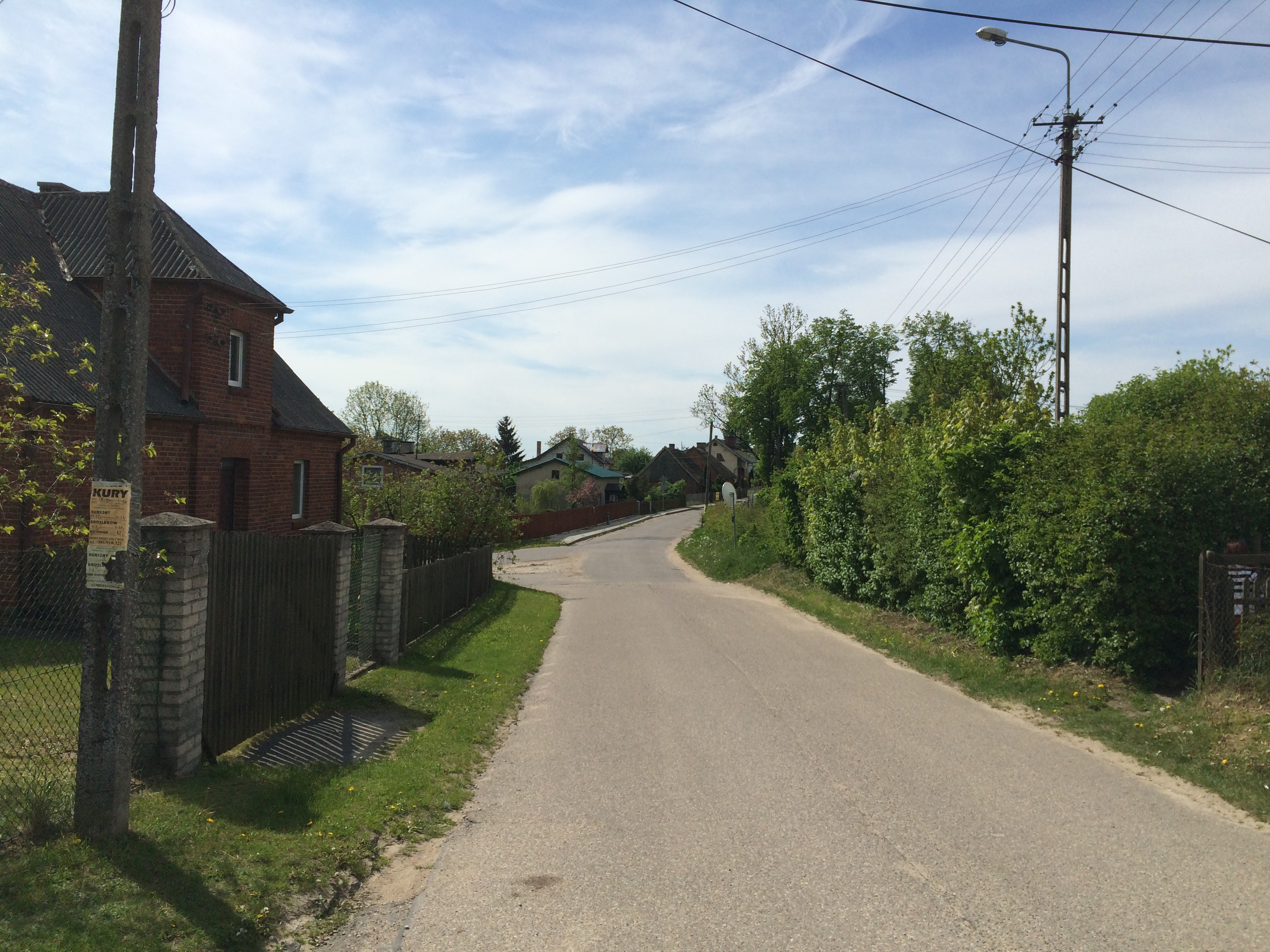

- Location within Poland
- Coordinates: 53°29′N 19°30′E
- Country: Poland
- Voivodeship: Warmian-Masurian
- County: Nowe Miasto
- Gmina: Bratian

Lekarty [lɛˈkartɨ] is a village in the administrative district of Gmina Bratian, within Nowe Miasto County, Warmian-Masurian Voivodeship, in northern Poland.
