= Kaczek =

- Village
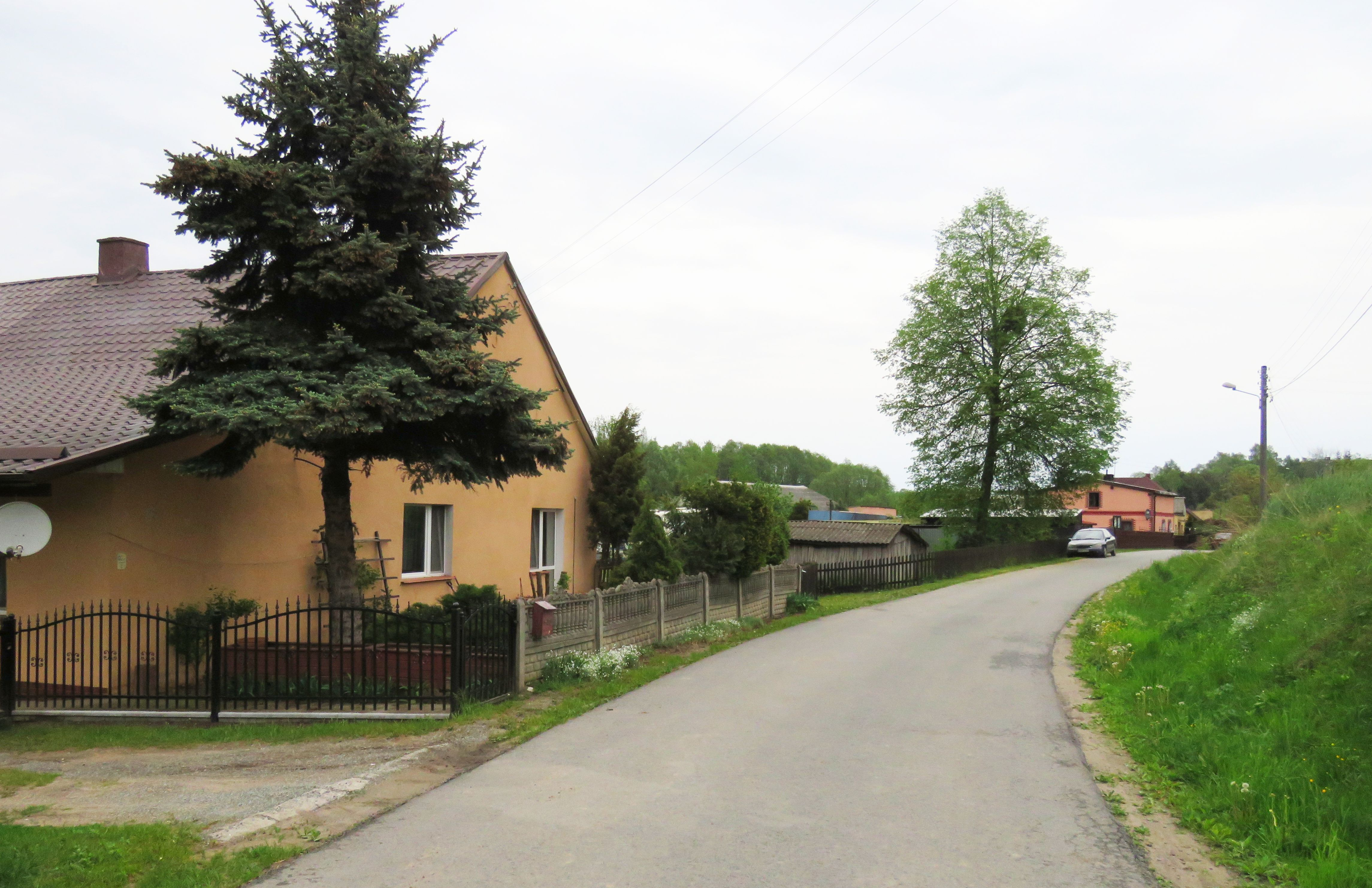

- Location within Poland
- Coordinates: 53°27′40″N 19°38′11″E
- Country: Poland
- Voivodeship: Warmian-Masurian
- County: Nowe Miasto
- Gmina: Bratian

Kaczek [ˈkat͡ʂɛk] is a village in the administrative district of Gmina Bratian, within Nowe Miasto County, Warmian-Masurian Voivodeship, in northern Poland.
