= Bagno, Warmian-Masurian Voivodeship =

Bagno
- Village
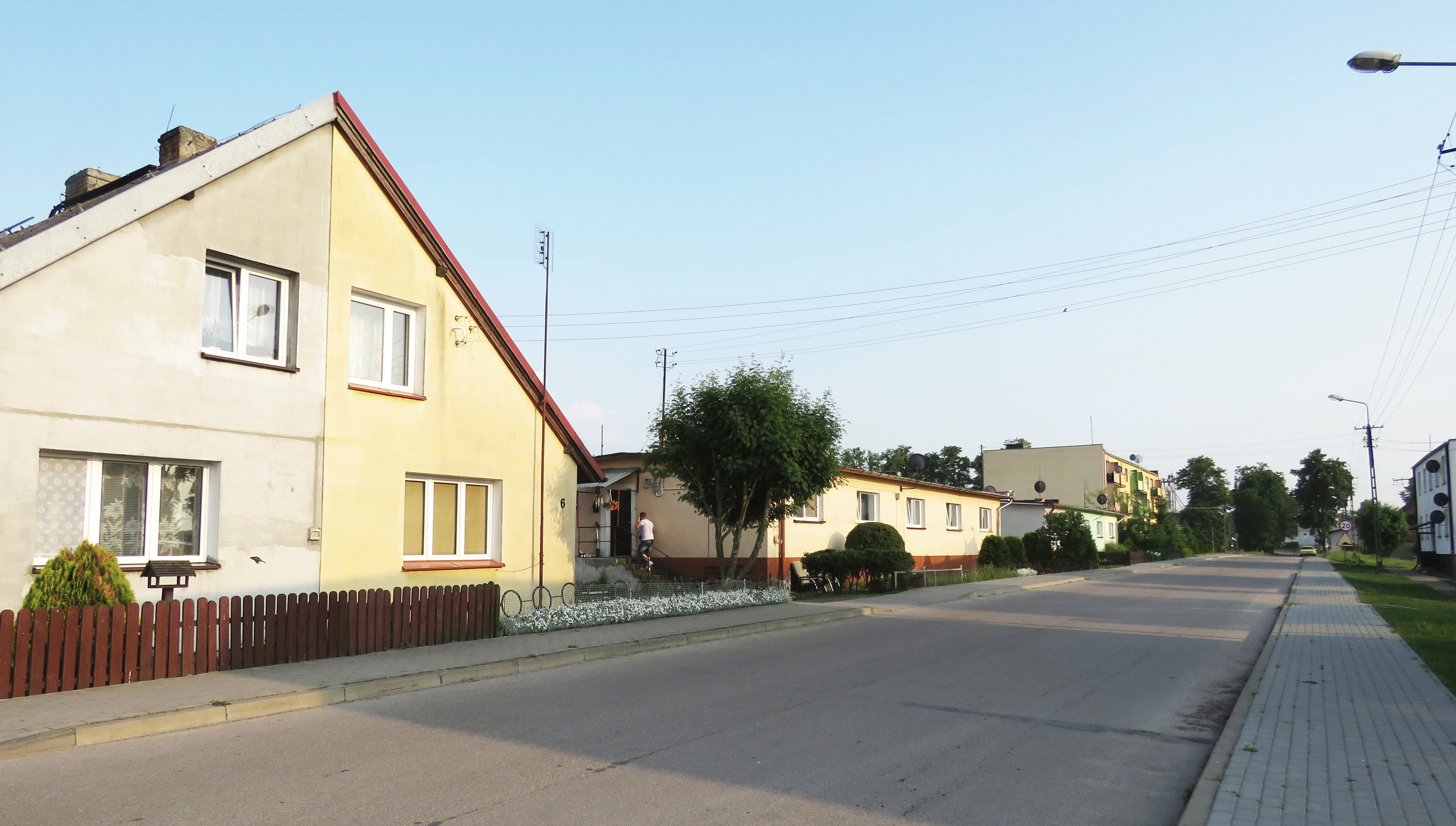

- Location within Poland
- Coordinates: 53°31′6″N 19°32′10″E
- Country: Poland
- Voivodeship: Warmian-Masurian
- County: Nowe Miasto
- Gmina: Bratian
- Population: 230
- Time zone: UTC+1 (CET)
  - Summer (DST): UTC+2 (CEST)
- Vehicle registration: NNM

Bagno [ˈbaɡnɔ] is a village in the administrative district of Gmina Bratian, within Nowe Miasto County, Warmian-Masurian Voivodeship, in northern Poland.

== History ==
During the German occupation of Poland (World War II), on October 9, 1939, the Sicherheitspolizei murdered six Poles in the village, including four farmers, one teacher and one merchant (see Intelligenzaktion).
