= Gwiździny, Nowe Miasto County =

Gwiździny
- Village
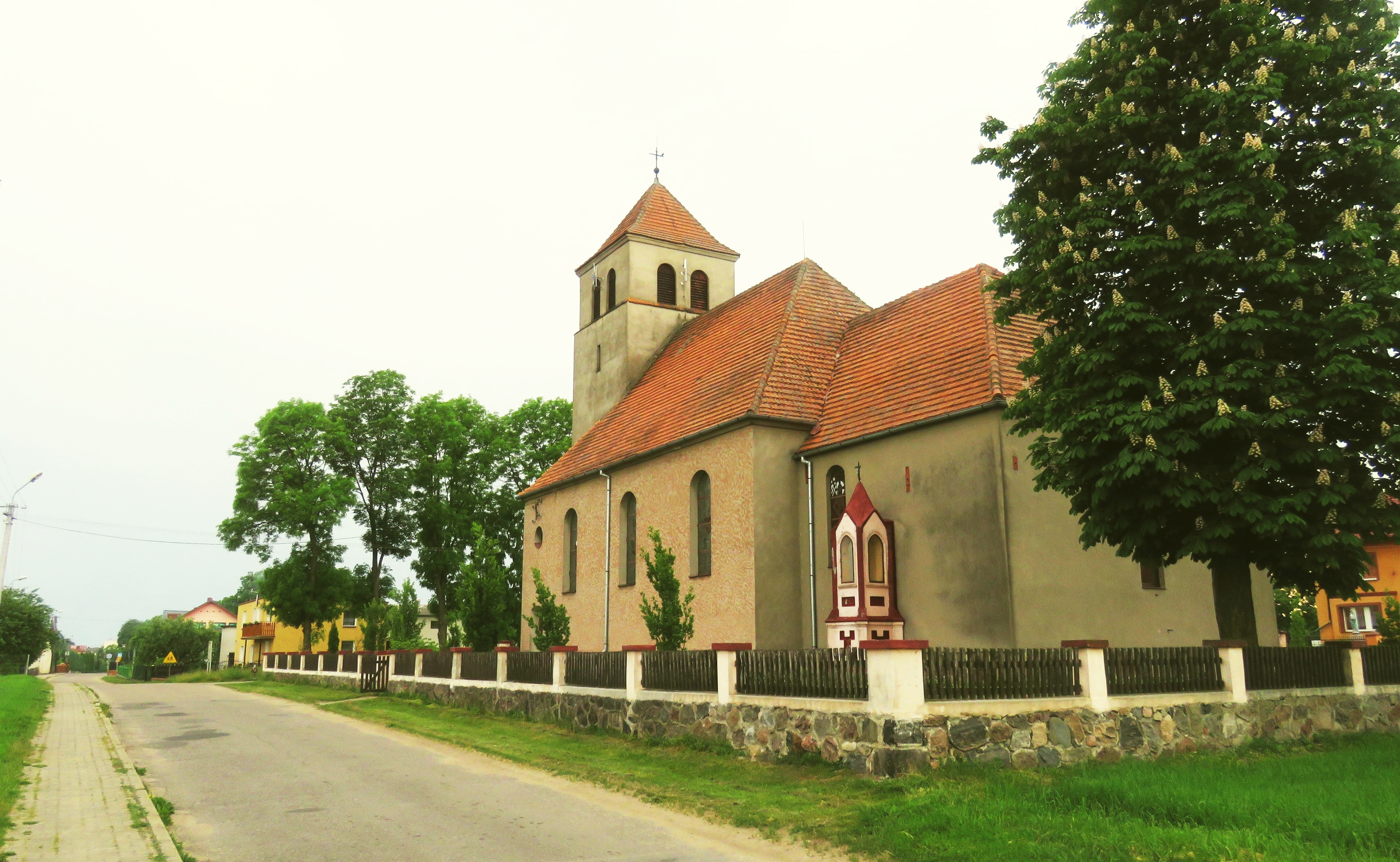

- Location within Poland
- Coordinates: 53°23′42″N 19°39′8″E
- Country: Poland
- Voivodeship: Warmian-Masurian
- County: Nowe Miasto
- Gmina: Bratian
- Elevation: 130 m (430 ft)

Gwiździny [ɡvʲiʑˈd͡ʑinɨ] is a village in the administrative district of Gmina Bratian, within Nowe Miasto County, Warmian-Masurian Voivodeship, in northern Poland.

During the Second World War it was the site of the Gwisdyn subcamp of the Nazi Stutthof concentration camp.
