= Nowy Dwór Bratiański =

Polish village in Nowe Miasto County

- Village
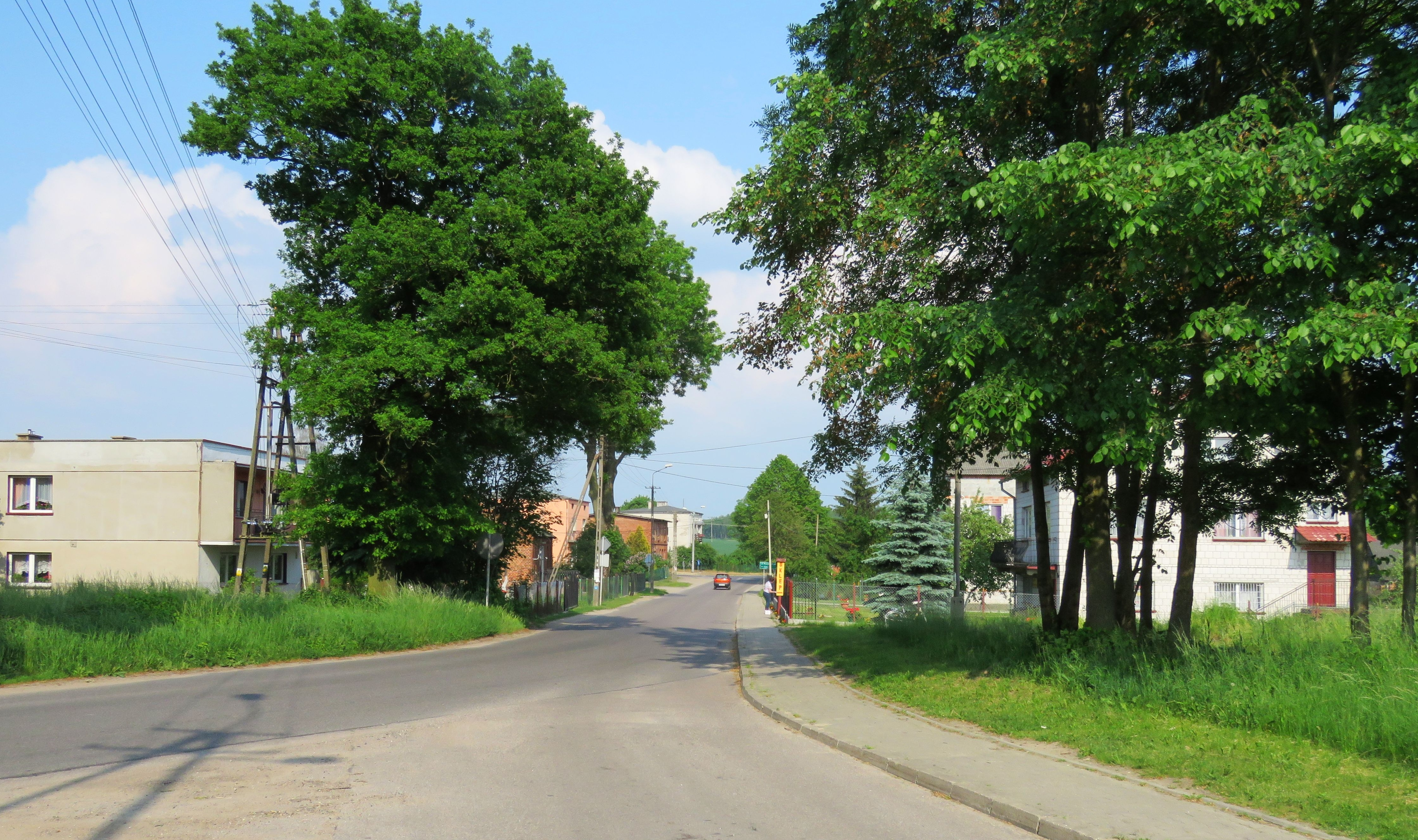

- Location within Poland
- Coordinates: 53°28′21″N 19°33′35″E
- Country: Poland
- Voivodeship: Warmian-Masurian
- County: Nowe Miasto
- Gmina: Bratian

Nowy Dwór Bratiański (Polish pronunciation: [ˈnɔvɨ ˈdvur braˈtjaj̃skʲi]) is a village in the administrative district of Gmina Bratian, within Nowe Miasto County, Warmian-Masurian Voivodeship, in northern Poland.
