= Roman Catholic Diocese of Fenoarivo Atsinanana =

Roman Catholic diocese in Madagascar

Coordinates: 17.3854°S 49.4077°E

Diocese of Fenoarivo Atsinanana Dioecesis Fenoarivensis-Atsinananensis

Location
- Country: Madagascar
- Metropolitan: Toamasina

Statistics
- Area: 25,000 km^{2} (9,700 sq mi)
- Population: Total; Catholics: (as of 2004); 739,116; 110,850 (15.0%)

Information
- Rite: Latin Rite

Current leadership
- Pope: Sede vacante
- Bishop elect: Marek Ochlak

The Roman Catholic Diocese of Fenoarivo Atsinanana (Latin: Fenoariven(sis) – Atsinananen(sis)) is a diocese located in the city of Fenoarivo Atsinanana in the ecclesiastical province of Toamasina in Madagascar.

Its cathedral episcopal see is the Cathédrale Saint Maurice, in the city of Fenoarivo Atsinanana, Toamasina Province.

== History ==
- 30 October 2000: Established as the Diocese of Fenoarivo Atsinanana from the Metropolitan Archdiocese of Antsiranana

== Leadership ==
Bishops of Fenoarivo Atsinanana

- Désiré Tsarahazana (30 October 2000 - 10 February 2009), appointed Bishop of Toamasina; later cardinal
- Marcellin Randriamamonjy (10 February 2009 – 31 October 2024)
- Marek Ochlak (17 April 2025 – present), the last episcopal appointment made by Pope Francis, four days before he died.

== See also ==
- Roman Catholicism in Madagascar
