= Bratian =

- Village
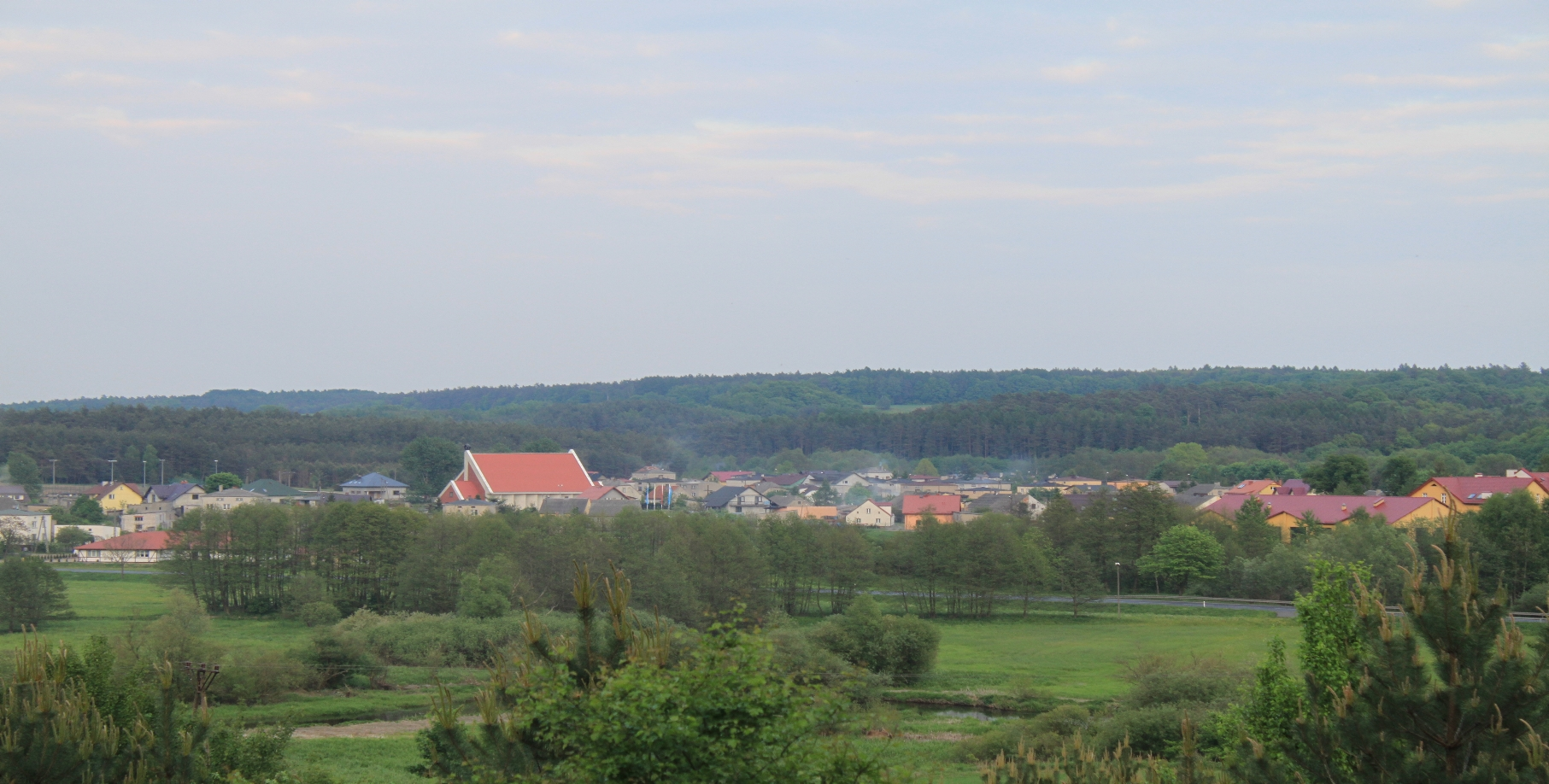

- Location within Poland
- Coordinates: 53°28′N 19°37′E
- Country: Poland
- Voivodeship: Warmian-Masurian
- County: Nowe Miasto
- Gmina: Bratian
- Population: 1,600

Bratian [ˈbratjan] is a village in the administrative district of Gmina Bratian, within Nowe Miasto County, Warmian-Masurian Voivodeship, in northern Poland.

Near the village is National Road 15. From 1975 to 1998 the village was in Toruń Voivodeship.
