= Łąki Bratiańskie =

- Village
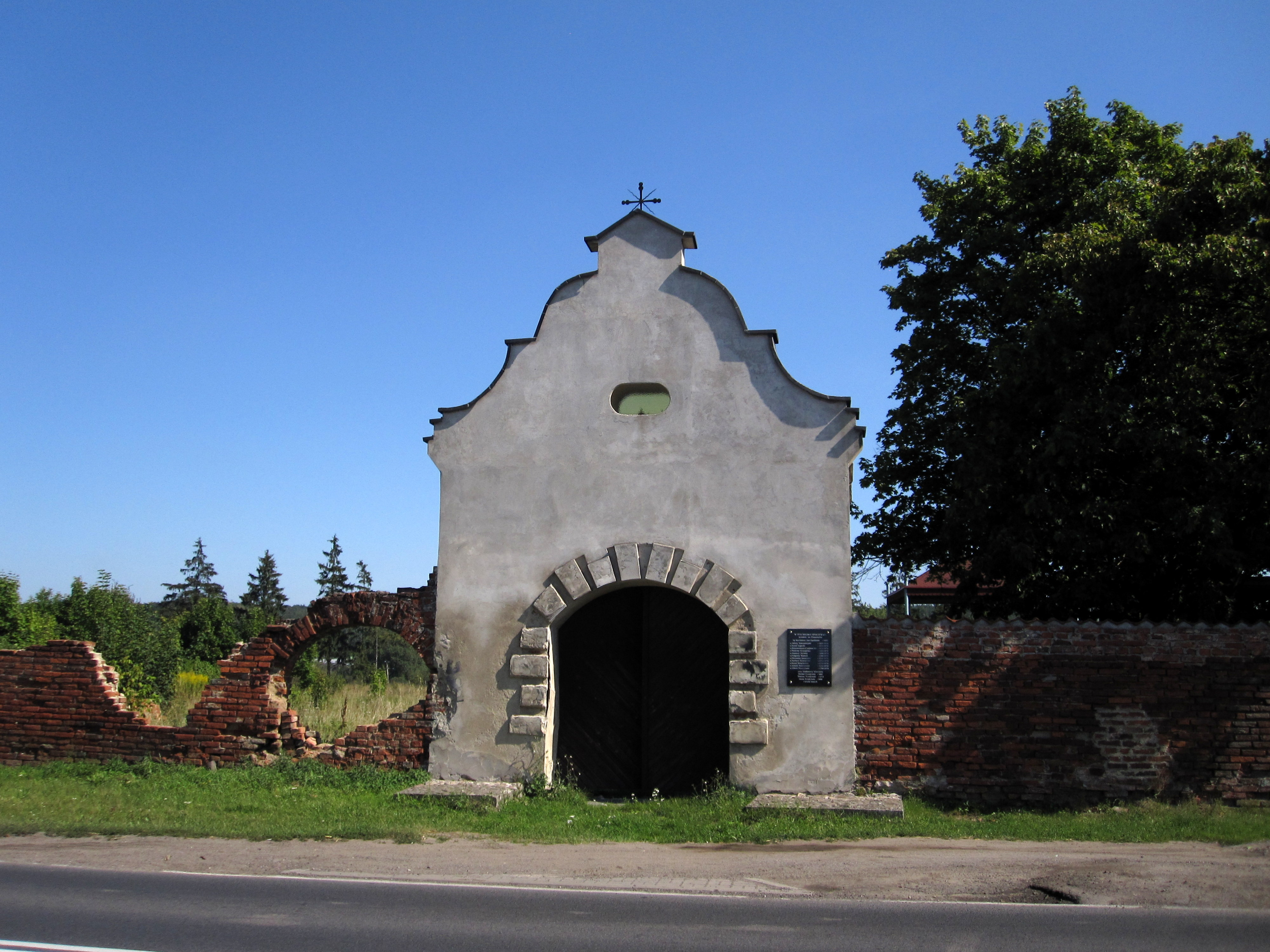

- Location within Poland
- Coordinates: 53°26′44″N 19°35′53″E
- Country: Poland
- Voivodeship: Warmian-Masurian
- County: Nowe Miasto
- Gmina: Bratian

Łąki Bratiańskie (Polish pronunciation: [ˈwɔŋkʲi braˈtjaj̃skʲɛ]) is a village in the administrative district of Gmina Bratian, within Nowe Miasto County, Warmian-Masurian Voivodeship, in northern Poland.

A Reformed Franciscan monastery existed in Łąki Bratiańskie from 1631 to 1882. The monastery was a popular destination for religious pilgrims, especially those coming from Kashubian towns. Between 1785 and 1790, a massive new Baroque church was built by the Franciscan friars. During the Kulturkampf, the monastery and the church were closed down; however, they were opened again once the Prussian Empire resumed normal relations with the Roman Catholic Church. Unfortunately, the entire Łąki Bratiańskie complex burned down in May, 1882 and has never been rebuilt.
