= Nowe Miasto Lubawskie =

Town in Warmian-Masurian Voivodeship, Poland

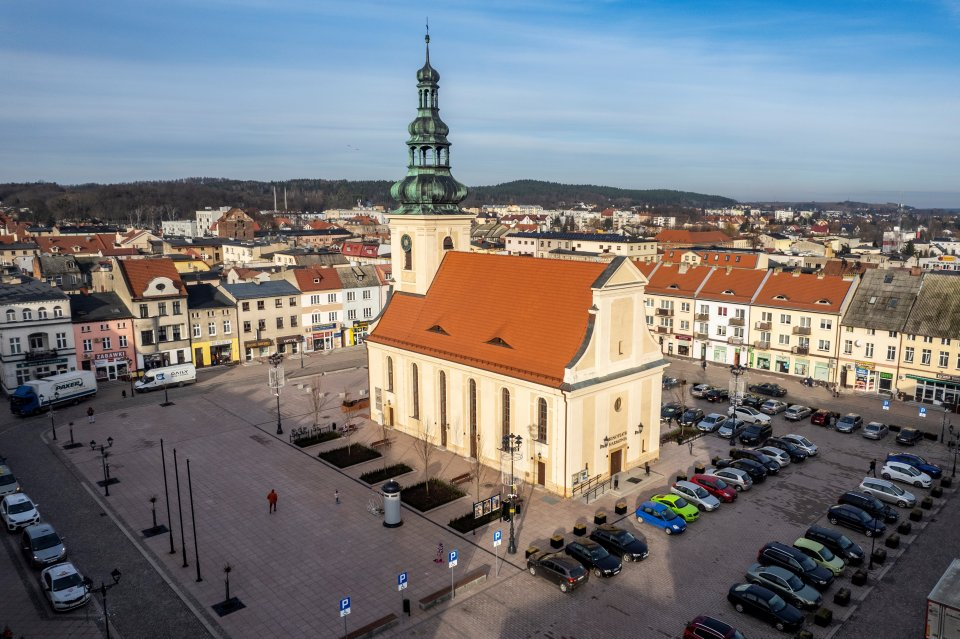
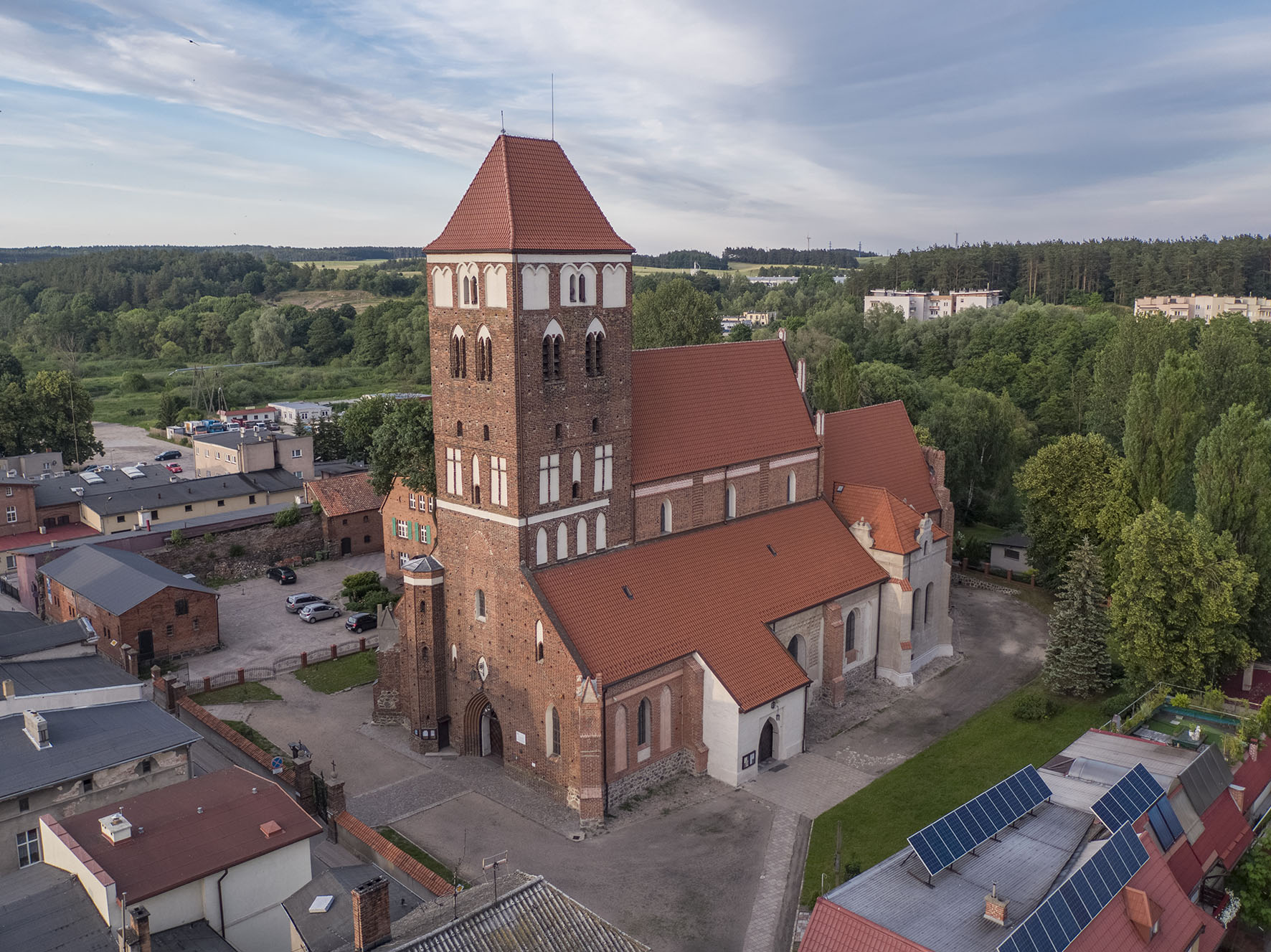
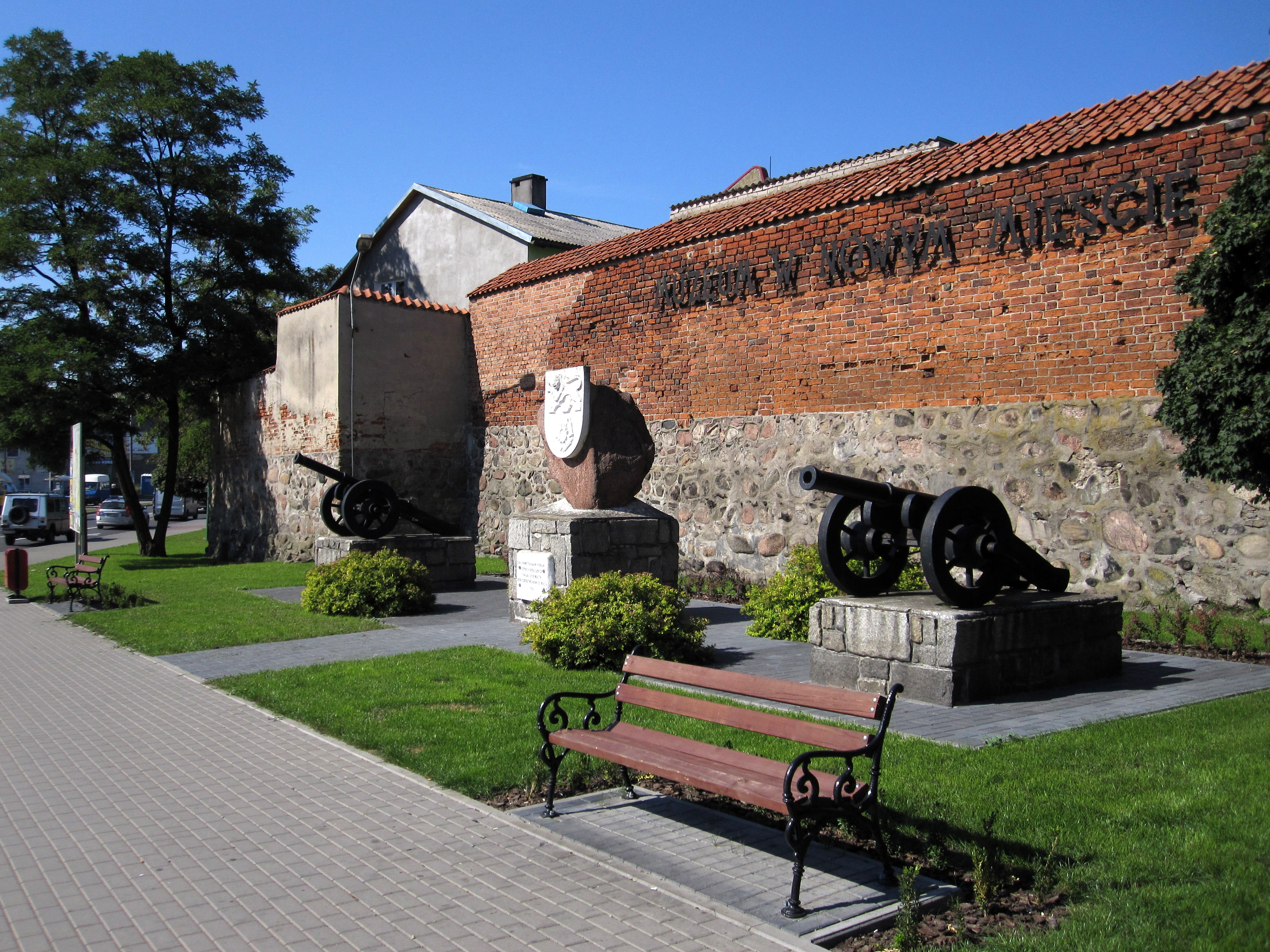
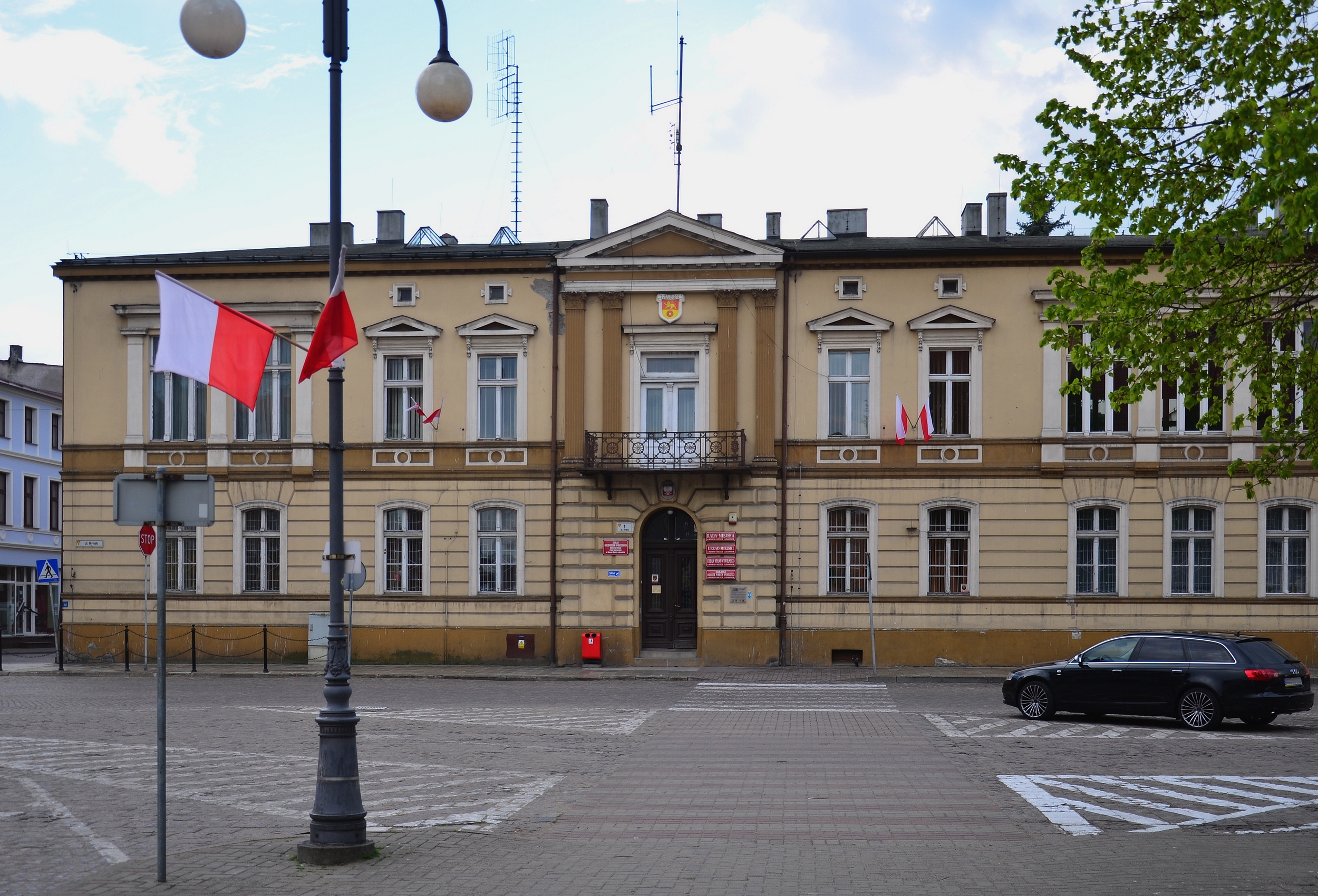
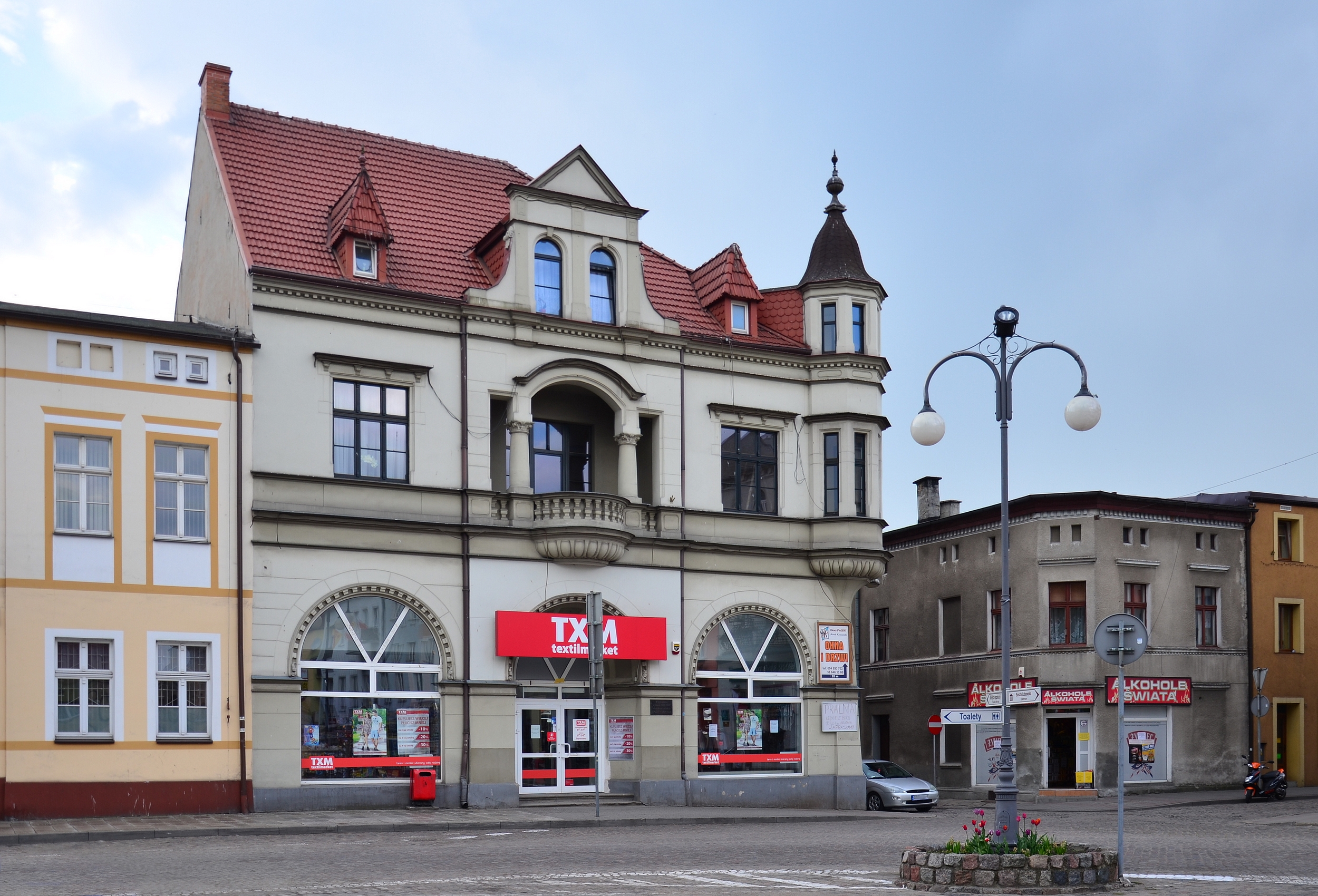
- Rynek (Market Square) St. Thomas' Basilica Medieval town walls Town Hall Townhouses at the Market Square

- Flag Coat of arms

- Location within Poland Location within Warmian-Masurian Voivodeship
- Coordinates: 53°25′32″N 19°35′16″E
- Country: Poland
- Voivodeship: Warmian-Masurian
- County: Nowe Miasto
- Gmina: Nowe Miasto Lubawskie (urban gmina)
- Established: 1325
- Town rights: 1325

Government
  - Mayor: Jacek Wolski

Area
  - Total: 11.37 km^{2} (4.39 sq mi)
- Elevation: 82 m (269 ft)

Population (2024)
  - Total: 10,089
  - Density: 887.3/km^{2} (2,298/sq mi)
- Time zone: UTC+1 (CET)
  - Summer (DST): UTC+2 (CEST)
- Postal code: 13-300
- Area code: +48 56
- Car plates: NNM
- Website: www.umnowemiasto.pl

Nowe Miasto Lubawskie (Polish: [ˈnɔvɛ ˈmjastɔ luˈbafskʲɛ]; German: Neumark in Westpreußen) is a town in northern Poland, situated on the River Drwęca. The total population in January 2024 was 10,089. Nowe Miasto Lubawskie is the capital of Nowe Miasto County in the Warmian-Masurian Voivodeship.

== Geographical location ==
Nowe Miasto Lubawskie lies on the right (west) bank of the upper course of the River Drwęca in Chełmno Land in the historic region of Pomerania, some 15 km south-west of the town of Lubawa, 70 km south-west of the town of Olsztyn, and 120 km south-east of the region's capital, Gdańsk.

== History ==
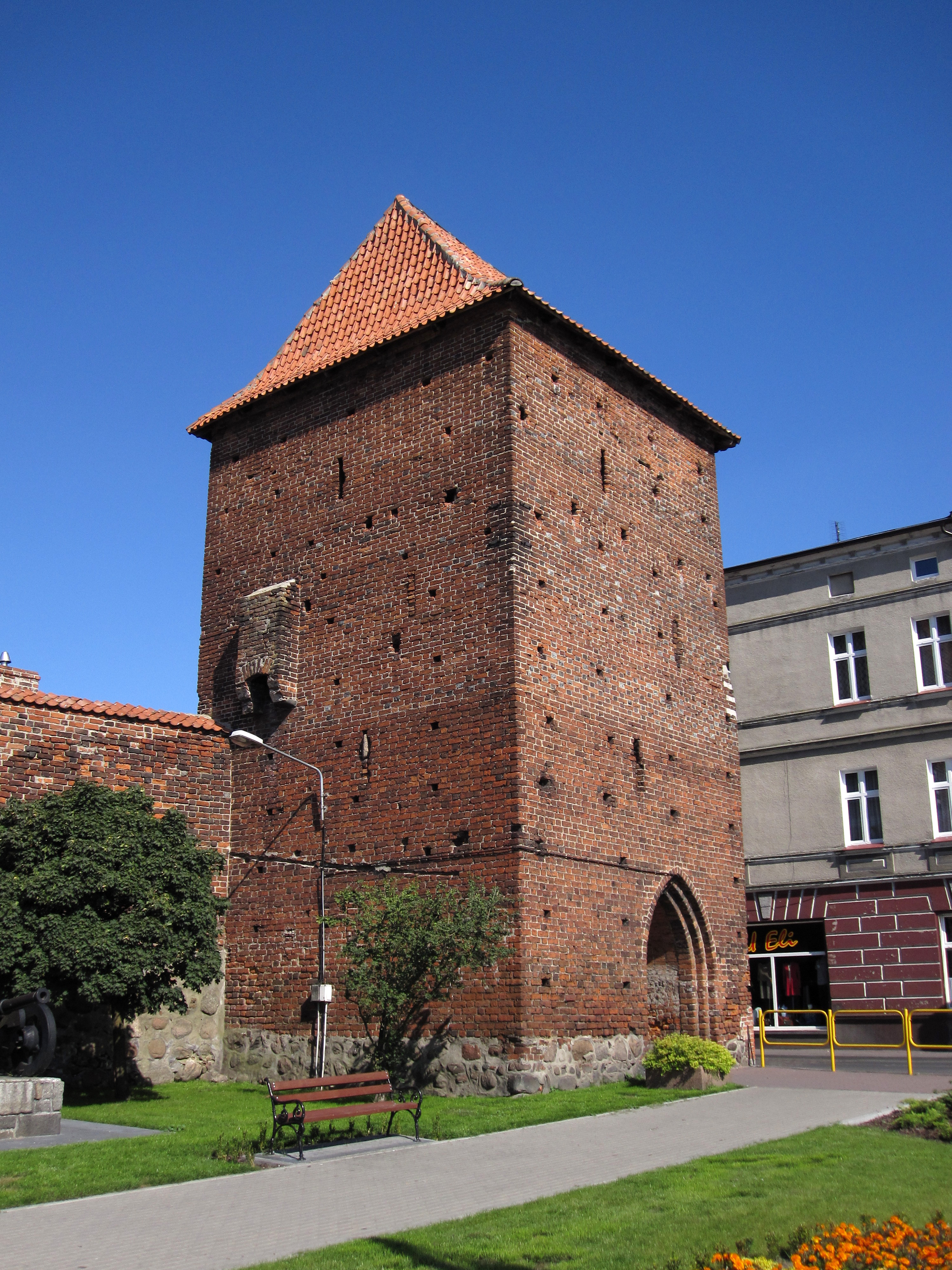
Medieval Brodnica Gate (Brama Brodnicka)

Early history involved settlement by early Slavic peoples; later settlement was by Old Prussians who were conquered by Polish ruler Bolesław Krzywousty. In 1310 the Teutonic Order invaded and occupied the region of Gdańsk Pomerania and Otto von Luttenberg, commander of Culm (Chełmno), founded the settlement in 1325. It was known under the names Nuwenmarkt, Novum Forum and Nowy Targ. Between 1334–43 it was the seat of a Vogt of the Teutonic Order. It adopted Kulm law in 1353.

During the Polish–Lithuanian–Teutonic War, in 1410, the town briefly became part of Poland due to result of local fighting, and remained so until the 1411 peace treaty. In 1440, the town was a founding member of the Prussian Confederation, an association of towns and gentry that opposed the policies of the Order and wanted the region to become part of Poland. In 1454, the association asked Polish King Casimir IV Jagiellon to incorporate the region into the Kingdom of Poland, to which the King agreed and signed the act of incorporation in Kraków in 1454. In the Second Peace of Thorn (1466) the Teutonic Order renounced any claims to the area, and the reincorporation of the town into the Kingdom of Poland was confirmed. Administratively, it was part of the Chełmno Voivodeship in the province of Royal Prussia (which after 1569 was itself part of the province of Greater Poland). During the Reformation, in 1581 the parish church, which is almost as old as the town itself, became evangelical. In the 18th century the town was still surrounded by a town wall and by a rampart, and the parish church was Catholic. A Protestant church was built in 1824.

In the First Partition of Poland in 1772 the town was annexed by the Kingdom of Prussia, and as Neumark it was included to the newly formed province of West Prussia. It was briefly regained by the Poles and was part of the short-lived Polish Duchy of Warsaw between 1807 and 1815, and later it, again, fell under Prussian rule. The population was subjected to Germanisation policies. In October 1831, various Polish infantry units of the November Uprising stopped in the town on the way to their internment places. At the end of the 19th century, the town was capital of Landkreis Löbau in the Prussian administrative district of Regierungsbezirk Marienwerder in West Prussia, where it remained until 1919. According to the German census of 1890, the town had a population of 2,723, of which 800 (29.4%) were Poles. It had a Lutheran and a Catholic church, a Progymnasium, a court, a steam mill with grain trading, and (as of 1885) 2,678 inhabitants. The monastery Maria-Lonk was nearby. Around 1908 the town also had a dairy, an electric power plant, three sawmills and brickwork.

Following World War I, in 1918, Poland regained independence, and after the Treaty of Versailles became effective in January 1920, the town was reintegrated with Poland. Within the Second Polish Republic, Nowe Miasto Lubawskie was the capital of Nowe Miasto County (Polish: powiat nowomiejski) in the Polish Pomeranian Voivodeship.

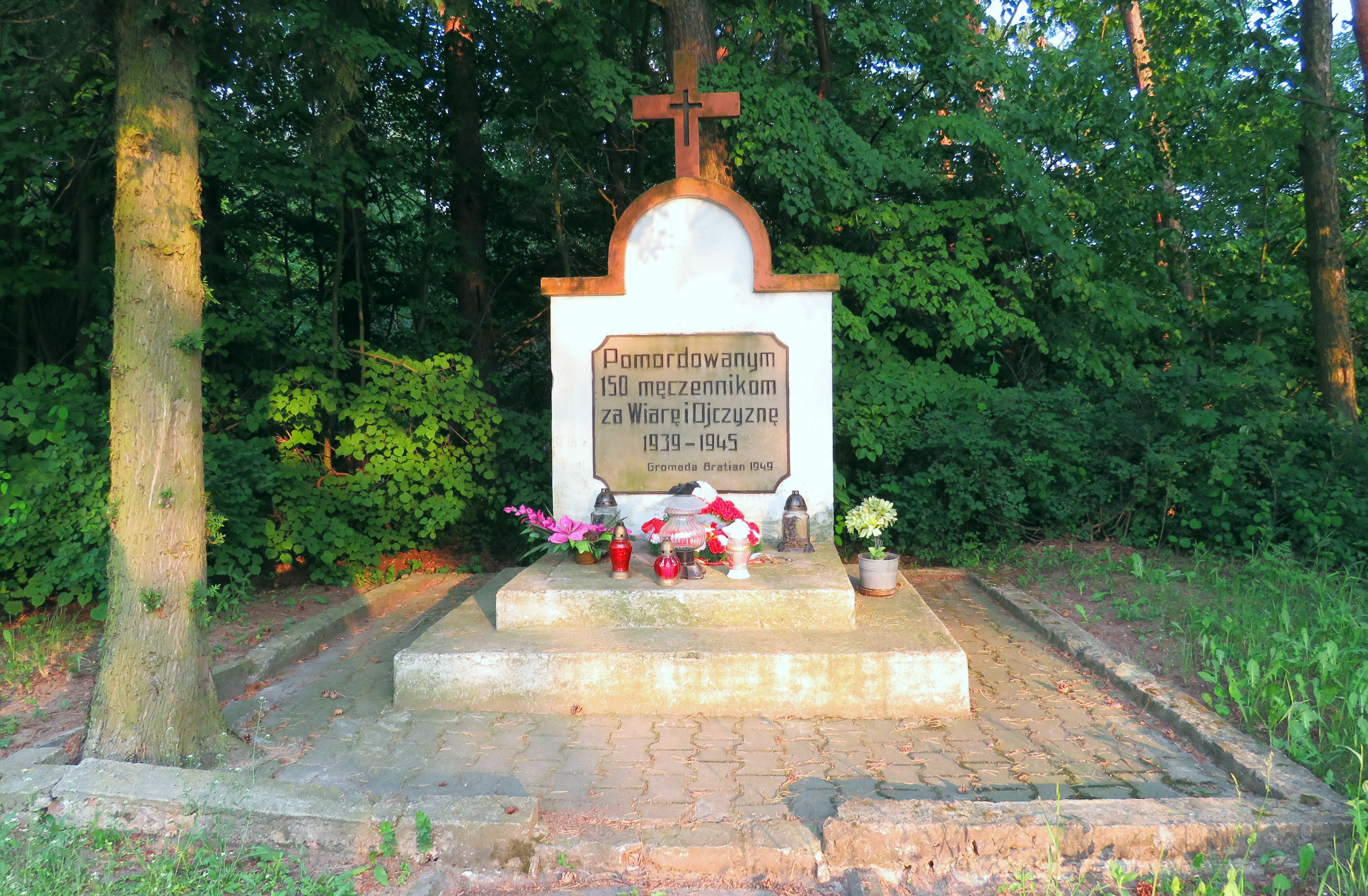
A monument commemorating 150 Poles murdered by the Nazi Germans in the Bratian forest massacre

On 3 September 1939, during the German Invasion of Poland which started World War II, the town and area were captured and then occupied by Germany. Afterwards 2,500 civilians were murdered in actions carried out by the SS and units made up from German minority's militia, the Selbstschutz. Under German occupation, from 26 October 1939 to 1945, Nowe Miasto Lubawskie was annexed directly to Germany and administratively made part of the Landkreis Löbau/Neumark in the newly formed province of Reichsgau Danzig-West Prussia. The local Polish police chief and further two local Polish policeman were murdered by the Russians in the Katyn massacre in 1940. On 21 January 1945 the town was captured by the Red Army. After the war the town was restored to Poland, although with a Soviet-installed communist regime which stayed in power until the 1980s (see People's Republic of Poland).

== Demographics ==
Historical population

Year	Pop.	±%
1789	809	—
1831	1,188	+46.8%
1843	1,474	+24.1%
1875	2,371	+60.9%
1880	2,742	+15.6%
1885	2,678	−2.3%

Year	Pop.	±%
1890	2,723	+1.7%
1900	3,144	+15.5%
1905	3,800	+20.9%
1910	4,144	+9.1%
1921	3,721	−10.2%
1931	4,473	+20.2%

Year	Pop.	±%
1939	4,958	+10.8%
1950	4,497	−9.3%
1960	5,655	+25.8%
2006	11,036	+95.2%
2011	11,162	+1.1%

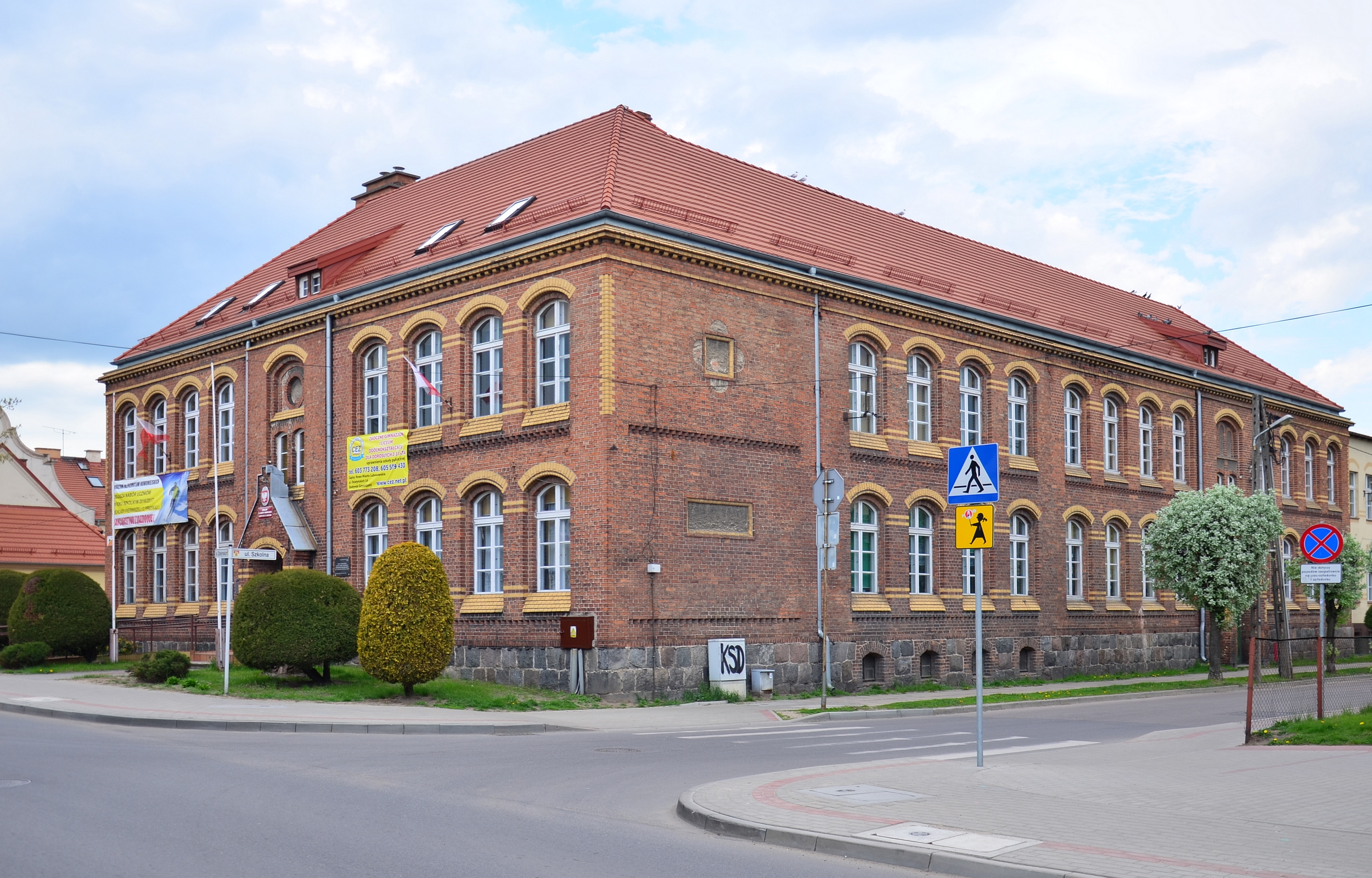
Elementary school

== Sports ==
The local football club is Drwęca Nowe Miasto Lubawskie. It competes in the lower leagues.

== Famous people ==
- Katarzyna Dąbrowska, Polish actress
- Zyta Gilowska, Polish economist and politician
- Wiesław Lendzion, Polish footballer
- Joseph Newmark (1799–1881), American Orthodox rabbi
- Philip Newmark, father of Harris Newmark, Los Angeles pioneer and retailer
- Marek Ochlak (born 1966), Bishop of Fenoarivo Atsinanana, Madagascar
- Harry von Posadowsky-Wehner (1869–1923), German Navy officer, Counter Admiral
- Jonatan Straus, Polish footballer
- Nikolaus von Vormann, German military person, Wehrmacht general
- Leszek Werner (1937–2014), Polish organist and music educator

== International relations ==
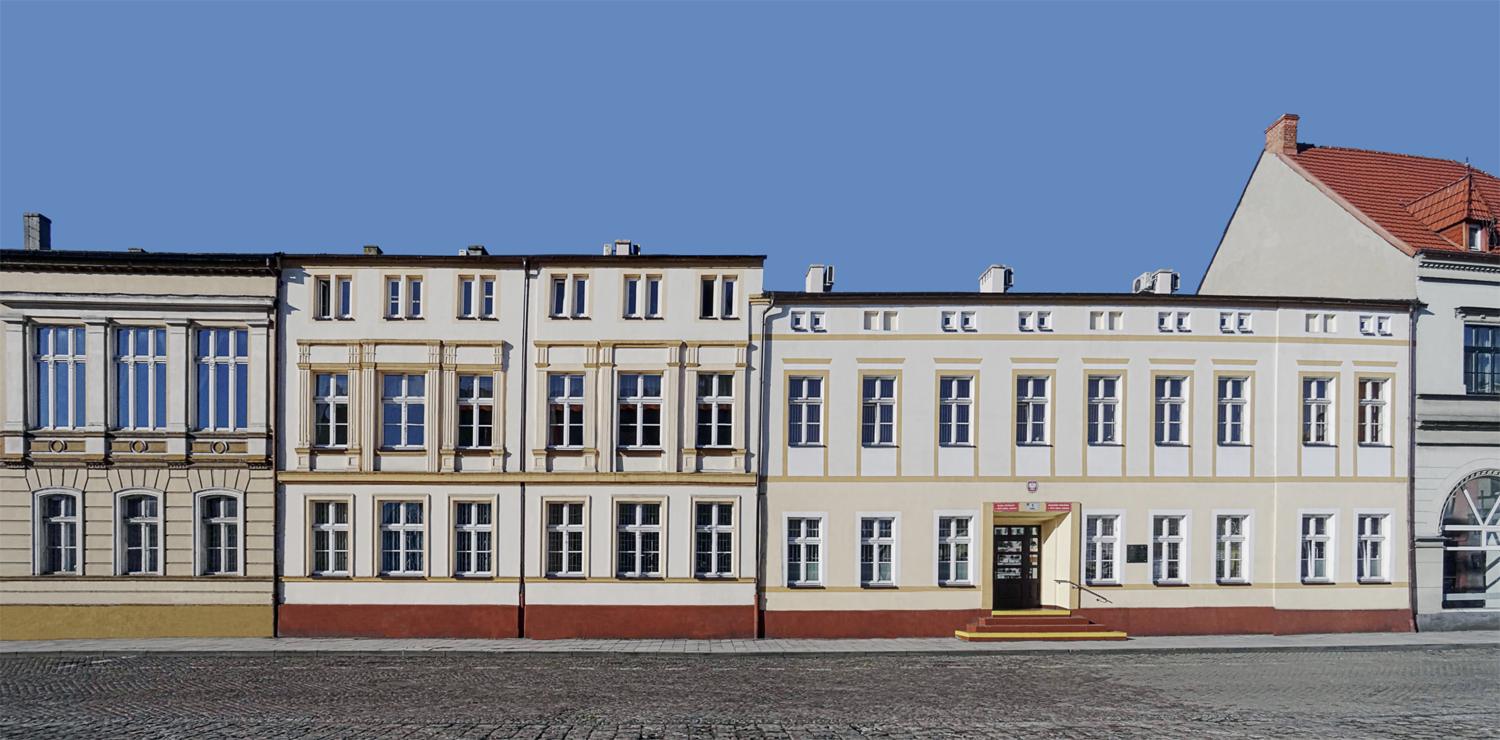
County office

Nowe Miasto Lubawskie is a member of Cittaslow.

=== Twin towns — Sister cities ===
Nowe Miasto Lubawskie is twinned with:

- Hude, Germany
- Šalčininkai, Lithuania
