= Sava Šumanović =

Serbian painter (1896–1942)

- Сава Шумановић
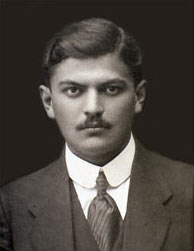
- Born: 22 January 1896; Vinkovci, Kingdom of Croatia-Slavonia, Austria-Hungary
- Died: 30 August 1942 (aged 46); Hrvatska Mitrovica, Independent State of Croatia
- Cause of death: Killed by the Ustaše
- Education: College of Crafts and Arts, Zagreb
- Movement: Original artistic expression

Signature
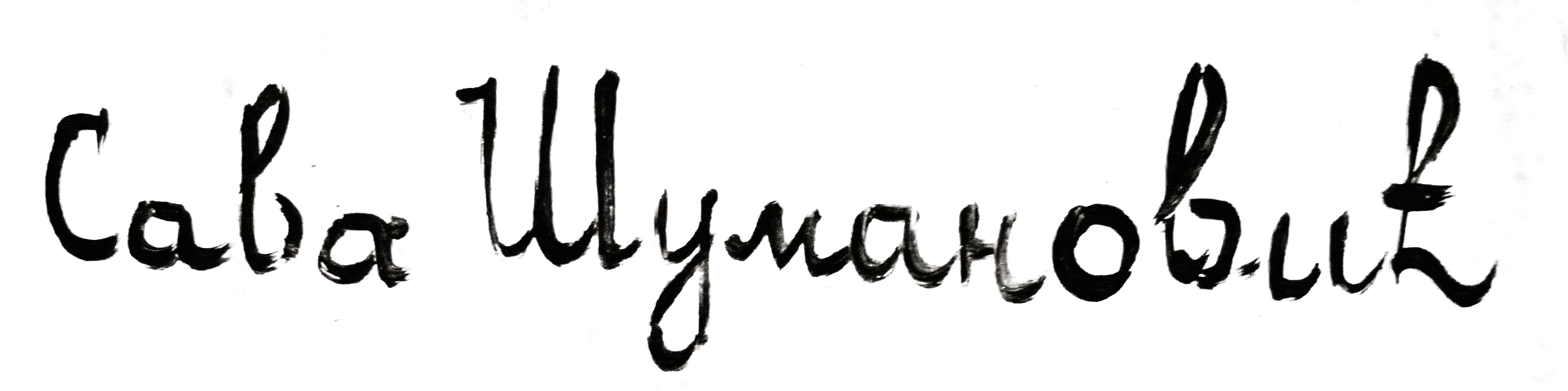

Sava Šumanović (Serbian Cyrillic: Сава Шумановић; 22 January 1896 – 30 August 1942) was a Serbian painter. He is considered to be one of the most important Serbian painters of the 20th century. Šumanović's opus includes around 800 paintings as well as 400 drawings and sketches. He was executed during the mass genocide of Serbs in the Independent State of Croatia. Ustaše tortured him and threw him half alive into a lime pit.

== Biography ==
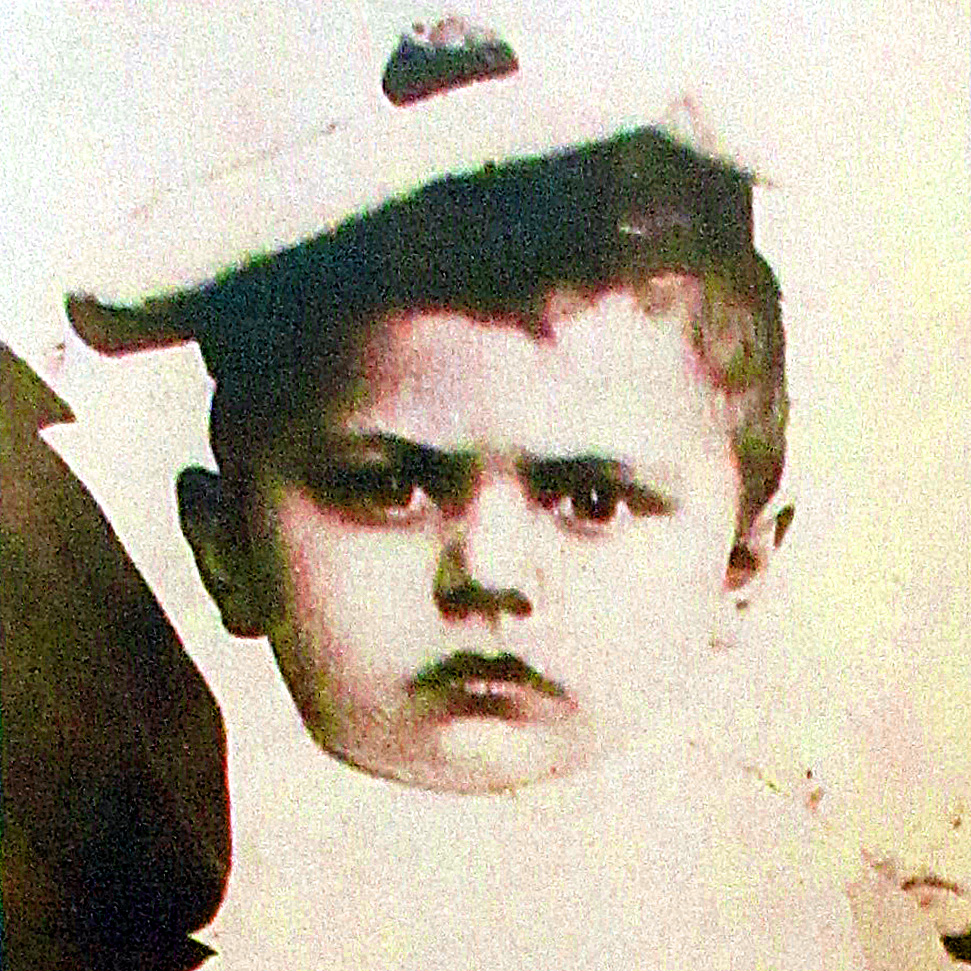
Sava Šumanović as a child

Sava Šumanović was born in Vinkovci, Austria-Hungary (now in Croatia) in 1896, the only child of mother Persida Šumanović (née Tubić) and father Milutin Šumanović, who worked as an engineer. The Šumanovićs were a rich and influential family, who were recorded in Šid as of the 18th century. When Šumanović was four years old his family moved to Šid (modern-day Serbia).

He graduated from the Zemun Gymnasium, where he was first introduced to the art of painting and the work of artists like Vincent van Gogh and Paul Cézanne. He later enrolled in the College of Crafts and Arts in Zagreb and soon after he lived in Paris for several years, since 1920. His professor in Paris was André Lhote. Šumanović befriended Amedeo Modigliani, Max Jacob and various Paris-based Serbian artists and writers such as Rastko Petrović.

In 1924 Šumanović wrote two notable essays: Slikar o slikarstvu and Zašto volim Pusenovo slikarstvo.

Living for a couple of years in Croatia, Šumanović returned to Paris in late 1925, and stayed again for several years, accepting certain influences of the Matisse painting style. In 1927 he produced some of his best known works, including Pijana ladja (Drunken boat) and Doručak na travi (Luncheon on the grass). Šumanović returned to Šid in 1928 and after another year spent in Paris, eventually settled there in 1930. His major exhibition was at the Belgrade New University in 1939, where he exhibited roughly 410 paintings, mostly from the Šid period. It was his first major success after many years. He lived quietly in Šid until the outbreak of World War II in the Kingdom of Yugoslavia in April 1941, when the Nazi puppet state Independent State of Croatia, led by the Croatian fascist Ustaše, occupied Syrmia and began a genocidal campaign against Serbs, Jews, and Romani people.

When the Independent State of Croatia upon its establishment banned usage of Serbian Cyrillic, Šumanović stopped signing pictures and only put the year. Ustaše police arrested Šumanović together with 150 Serbian citizens and took them to a concentration camp in Hrvatska Mitrovica (today Sremska Mitrovica). Šumanović was executed there on 30 August 1942, together with many other Serbs, and buried in a common grave in a Serbian Orthodox graveyard.

== Style ==
His early artistic style was characterized by various influences, mainly Cubism but Fauvism and Expressionism as well. In his later works, Sava Šumanović managed to develop his own, rather original artistic expression, which he simply called "the way I know and can." Due to innovations and unique style, Šumanović can be described as one of the most prominent Serbian painters of the twentieth century as well as a major painter from the Kingdom of Yugoslavia.

== Legacy ==
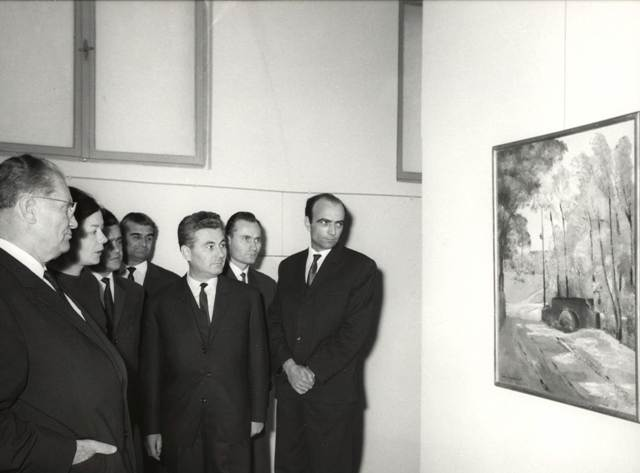
President of Yugoslavia Josip Broz Tito in the Sava Šumanović Gallery in Šid.

A museum dedicated to his life and work is located in Šid. His works are also on display in the museums of Belgrade, Novi Sad, Kragujevac, Zrenjanin and Split.

A gallery devoted to Šumanović's work was established in 1952, based on a gift from Persida Šumanović, the painter's mother. The legacy of 417 works of art, of which 356 are oil paintings, is located in the Šumanović family home (also used as a court). In 1989, the building was renovated and the original exhibition area was expanded from 400 to 600 m^{2} (4,300 to 6,500 sq ft). This enabled a large number of paintings to be exhibited simultaneously. The main activity of the gallery is the preservation and presentation of paintings obtained as gifts. In addition to this, a rich collection of documentary materials has been amassed, as well as an extraordinarily rich Hermoteca (newspaper and periodical library), containing the catalogues from all the exhibitions held until now.

Also part of the gallery is the Memorial House of Sava Šumanović, as well as the archaeological collection “Gradina on the Bosut”, and an antique sarcophagus. The artistic circle “Sava Šumanović,” consisting of local amateur painters, also operates within the gallery. Ten years after the gallery had been established, the memorial in honour of Sava Šumanović was initiated, an event which takes place every three years.

The July 2019 exhibition of his works organised by the Gallery of Matica Srpska in Cultural Center of Serbia in Paris caused wider media coverage and attention.

He is included in The 100 most prominent Serbs list.

== Selected works ==
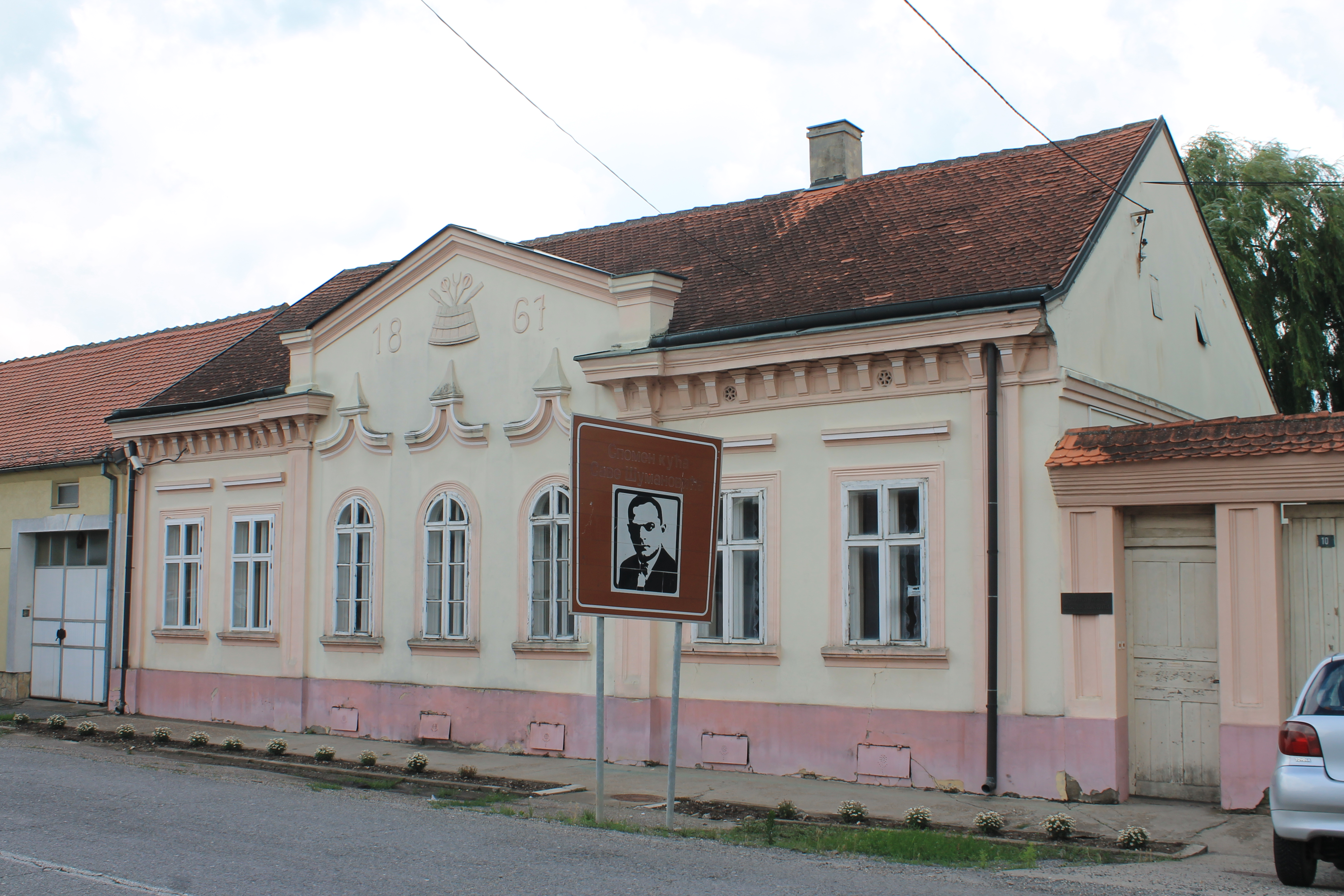
Šumanović's house in Šid

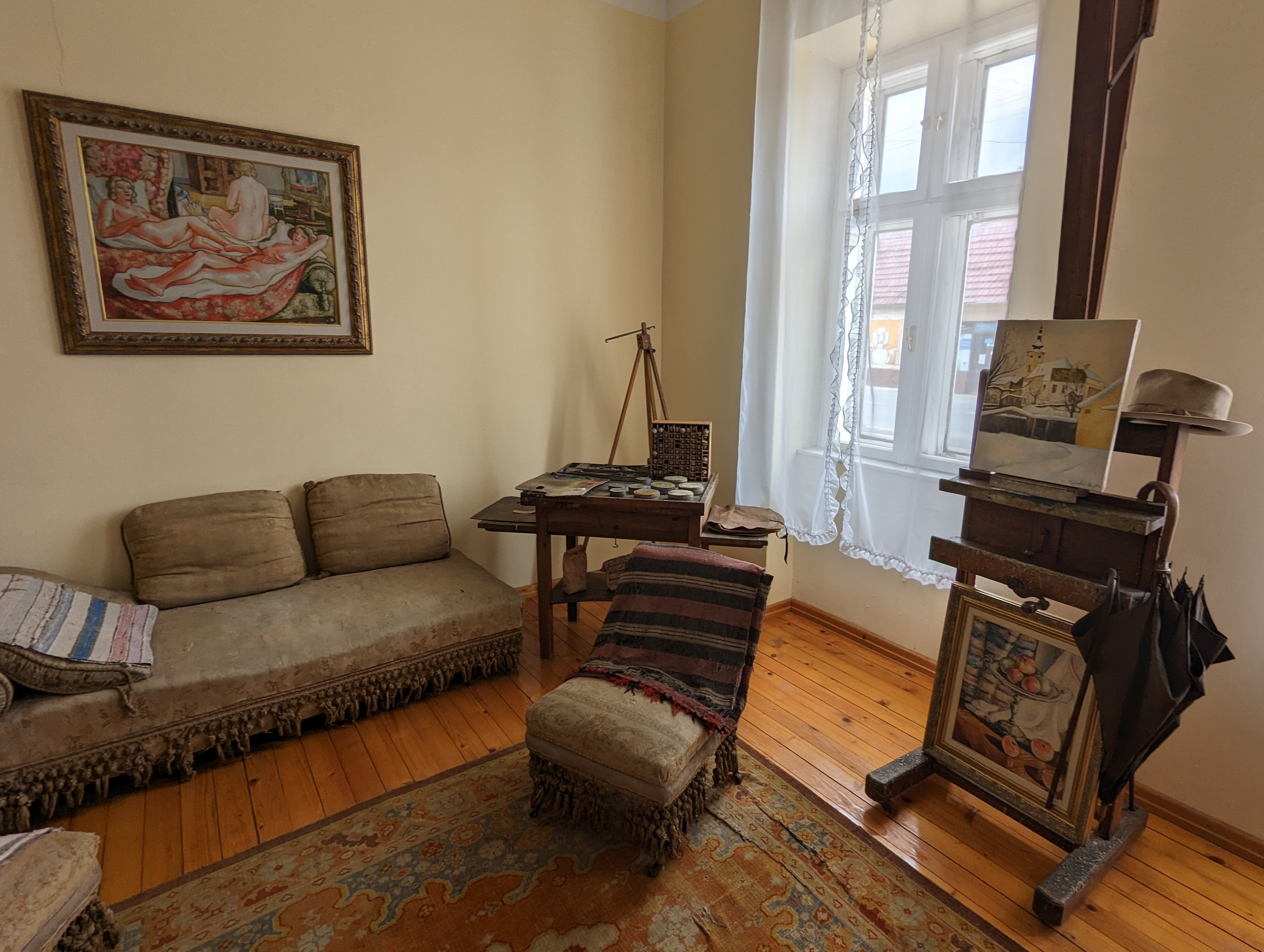
Šumanović's house in Šid

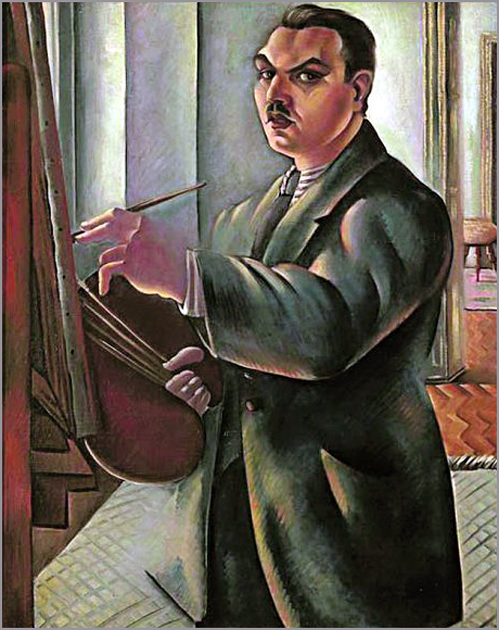
Selfportrait (1925)

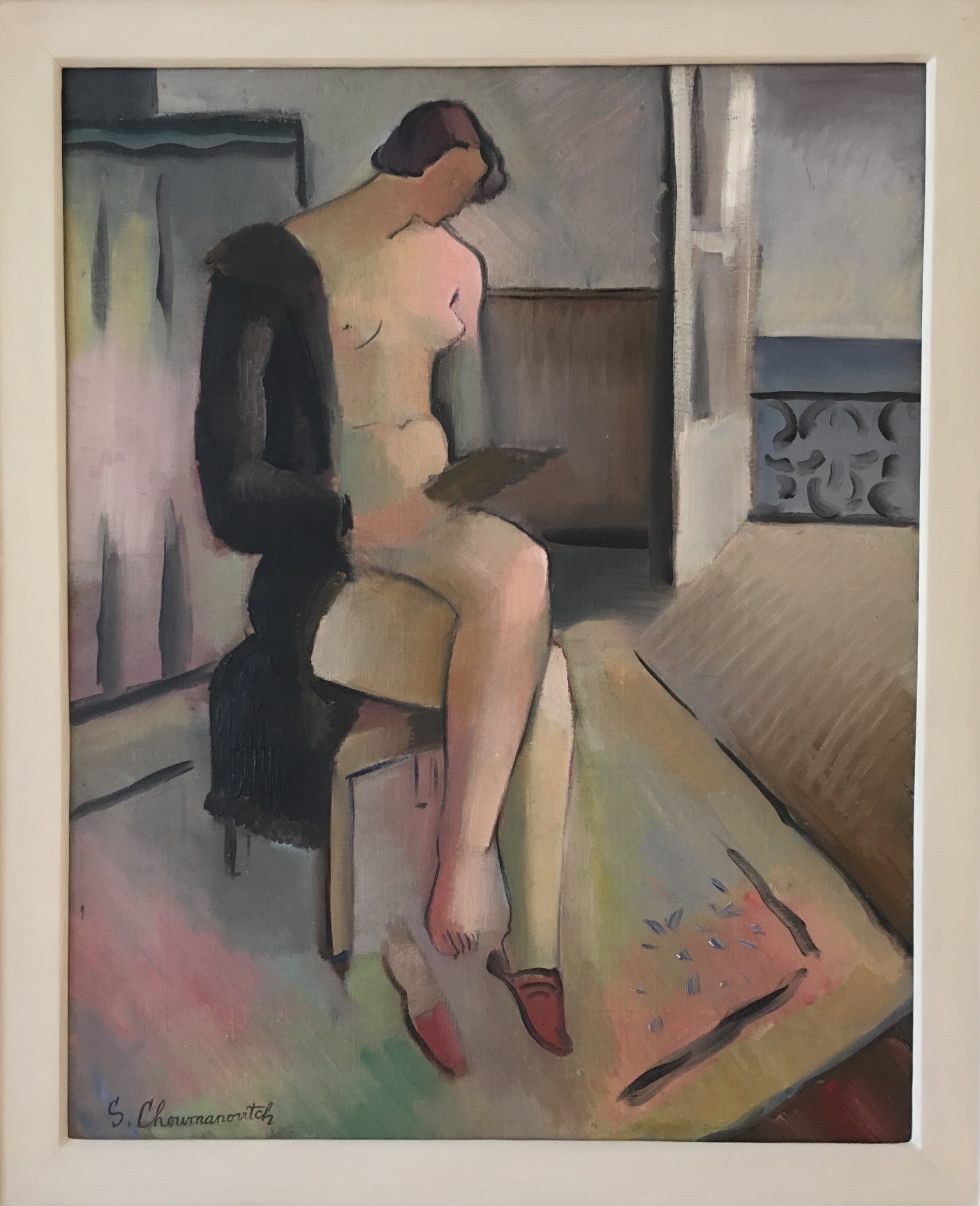
Akt u enterijeru (1926)

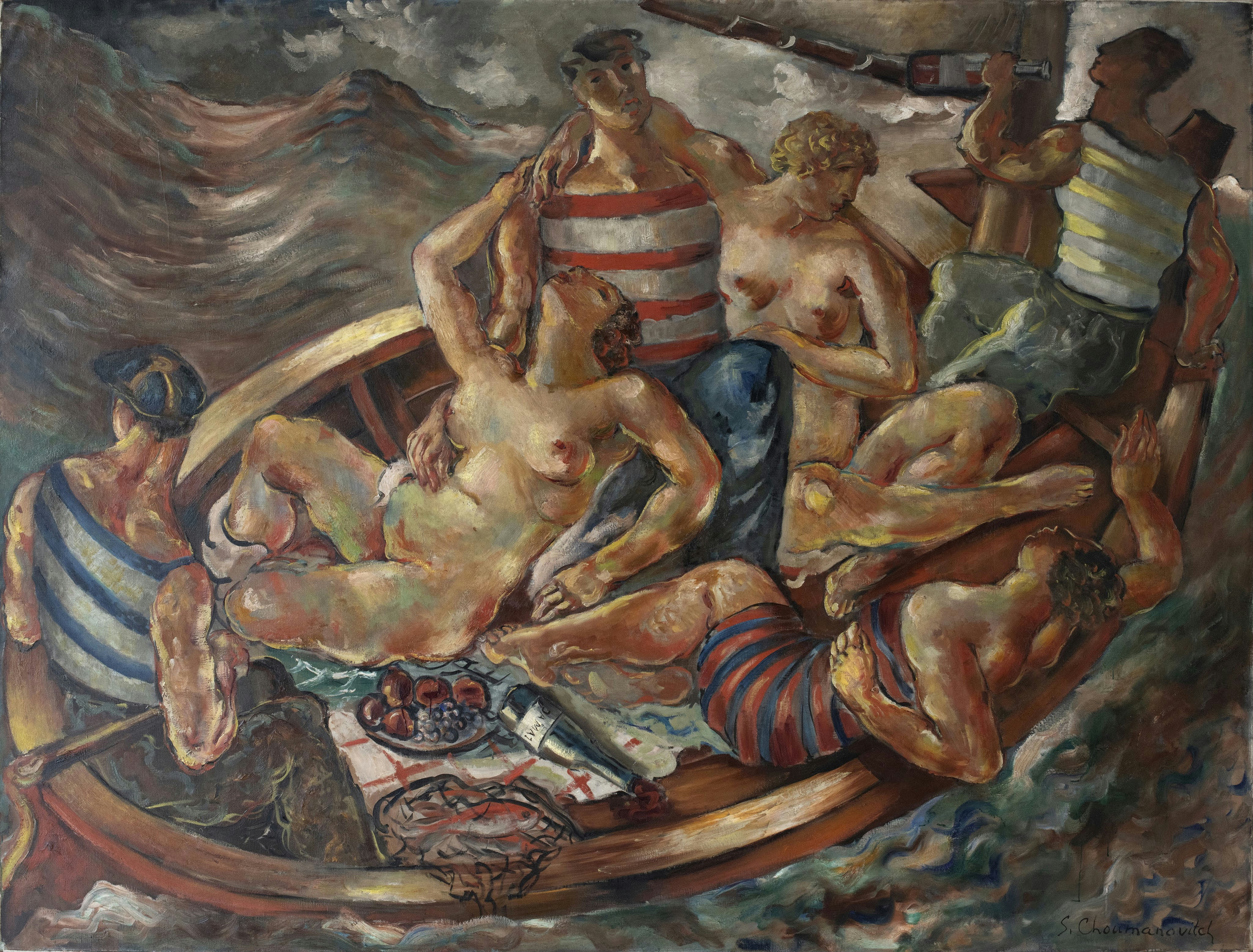
Pijana lađa (1927)

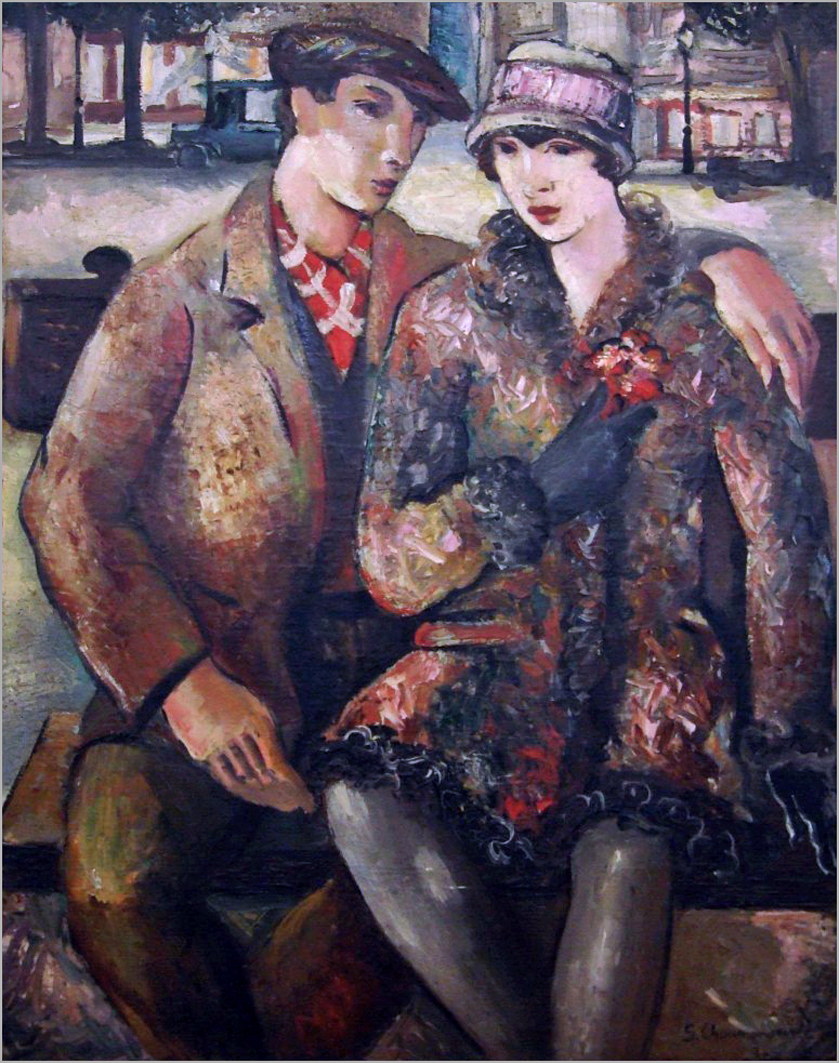
Love from Paris (1927)

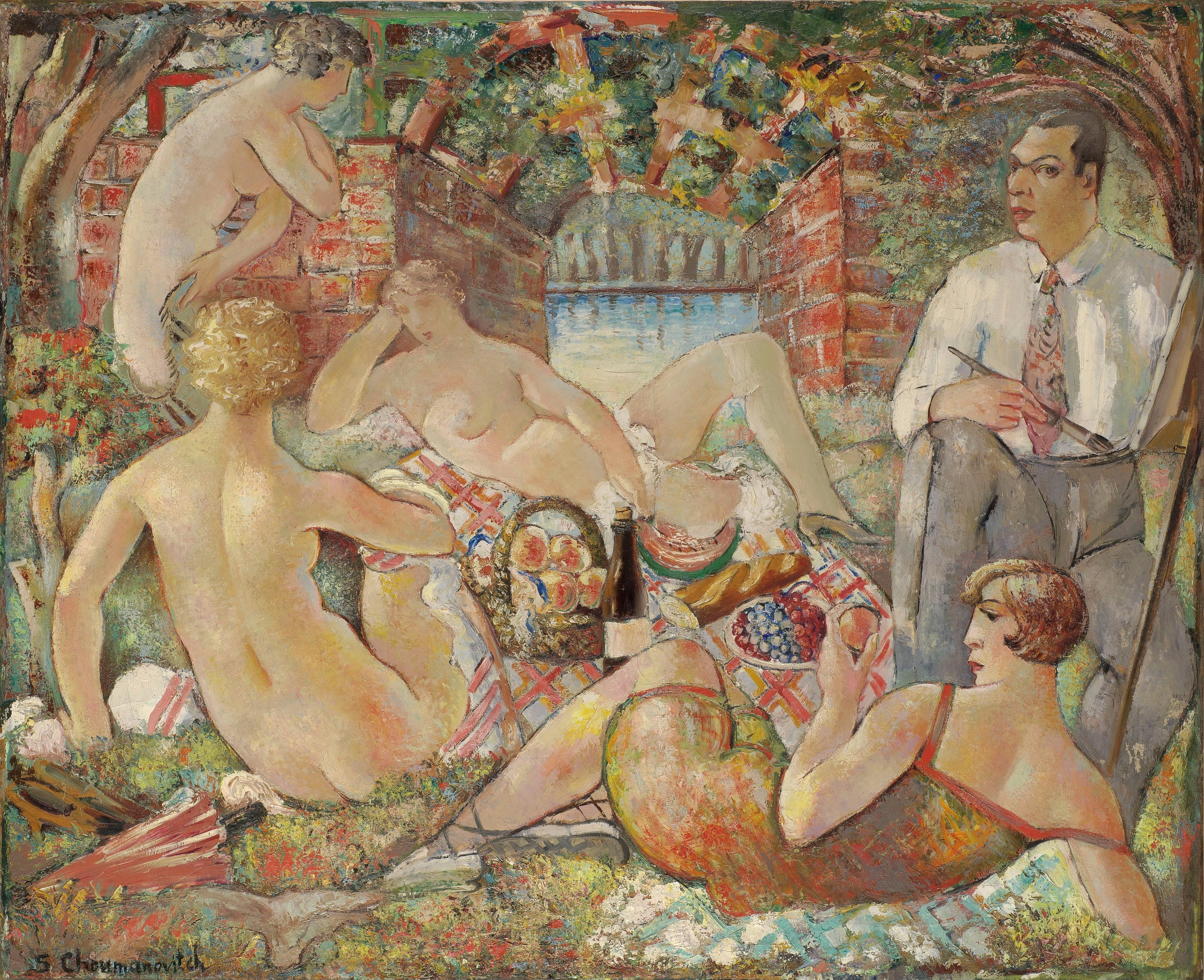
Luncheon on the Grass (1927)

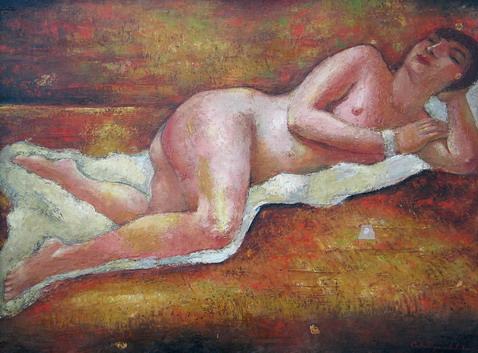
Morning (1929)

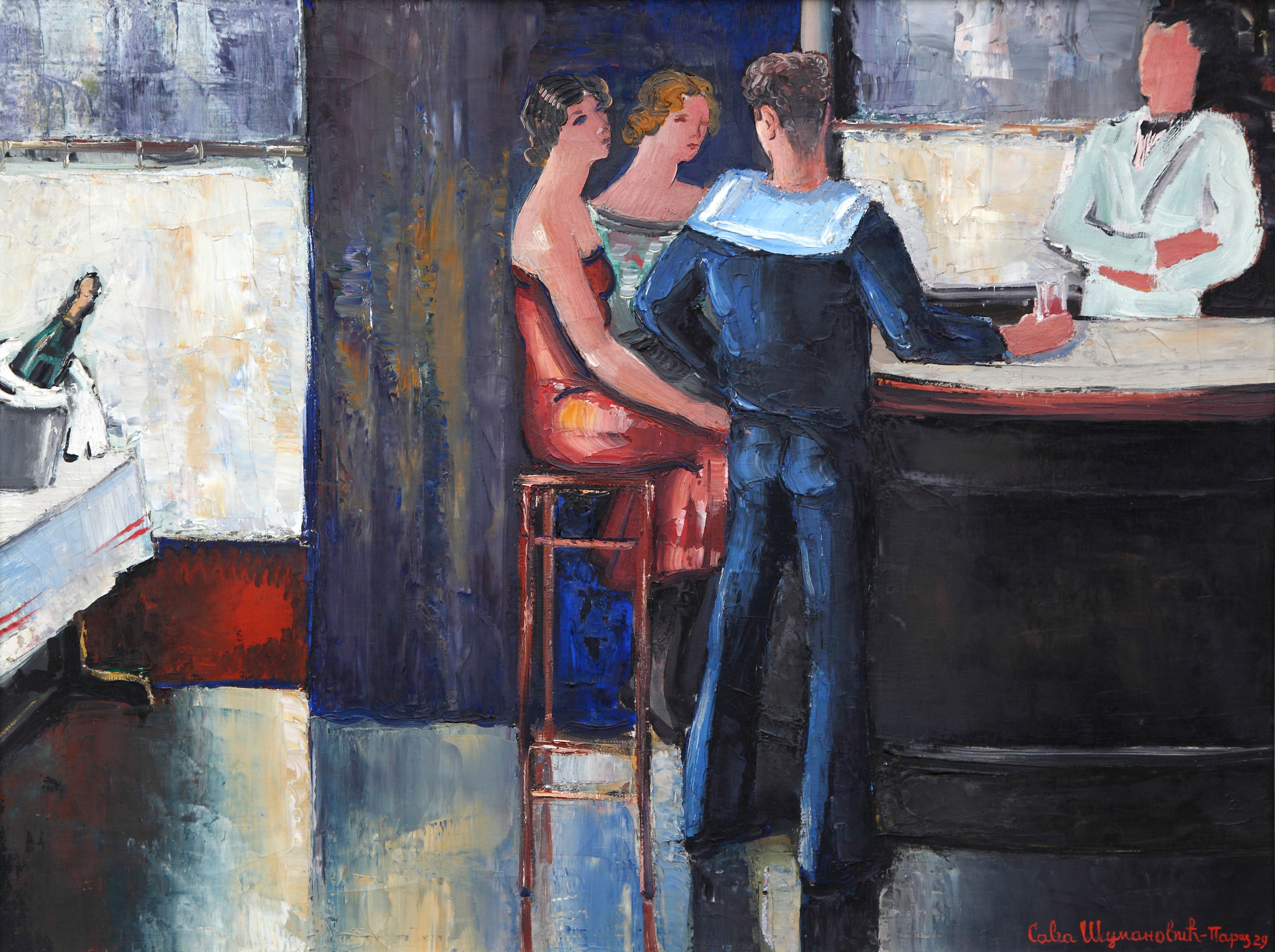
Bar u Parizu (1929)

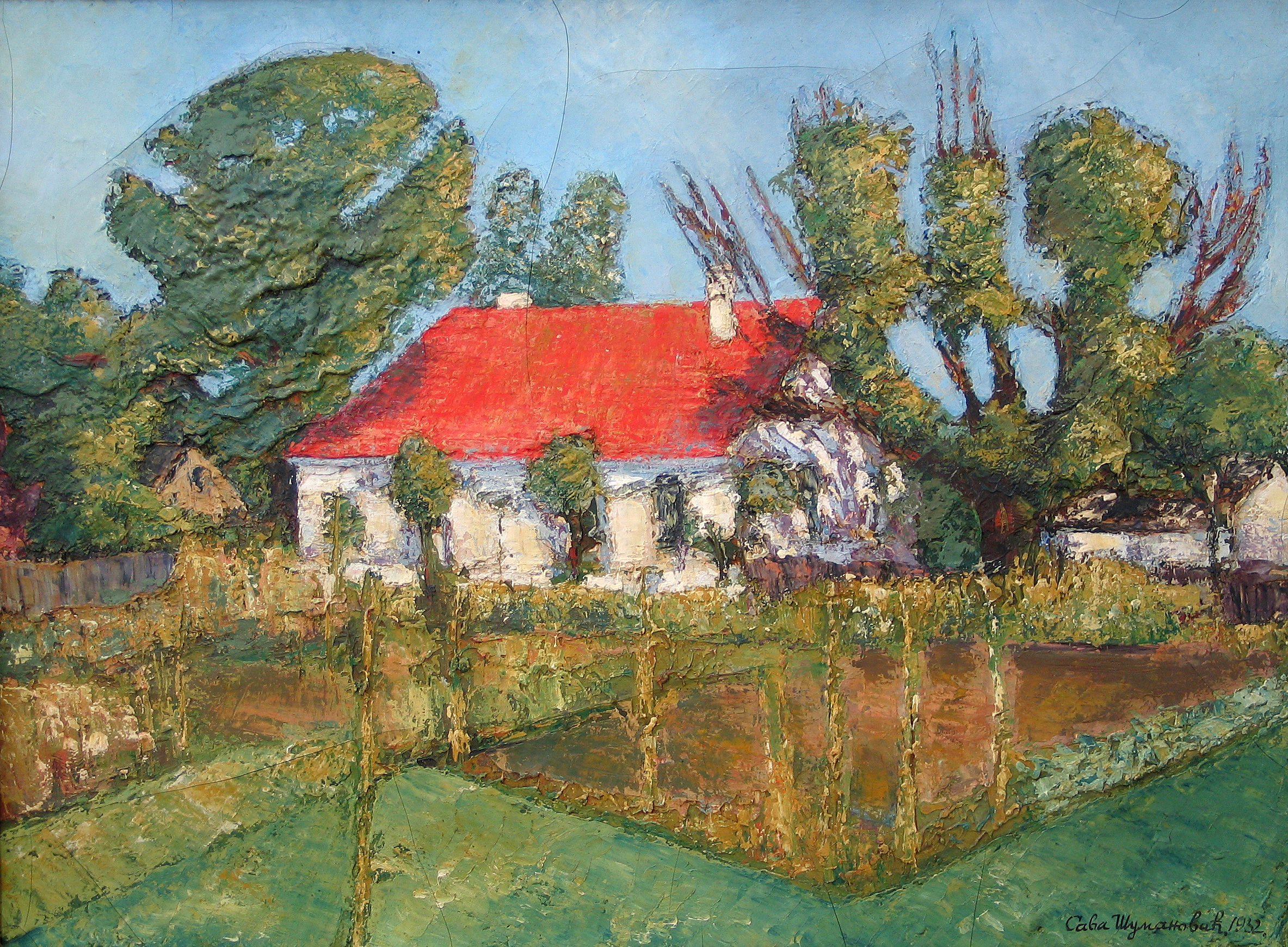
Seoska kuća (1932)

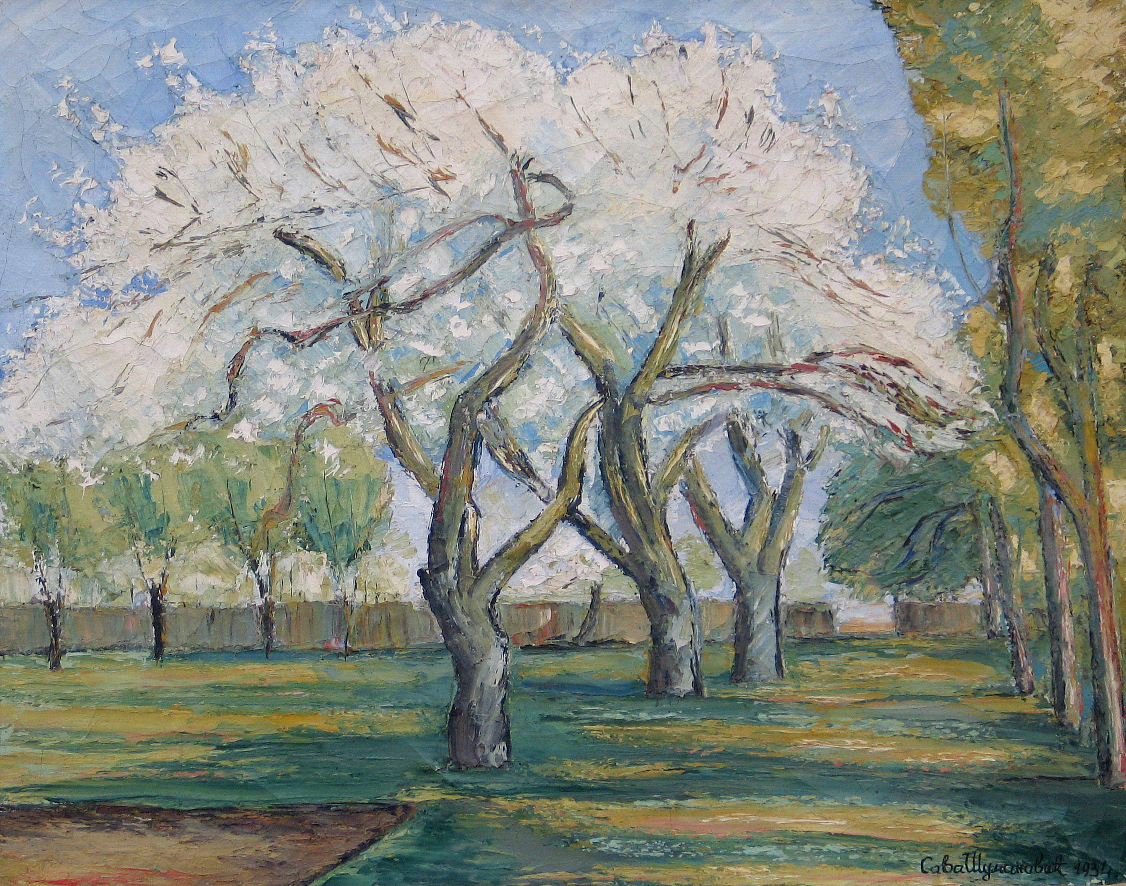
Proleće u šidskim baštama (1934)

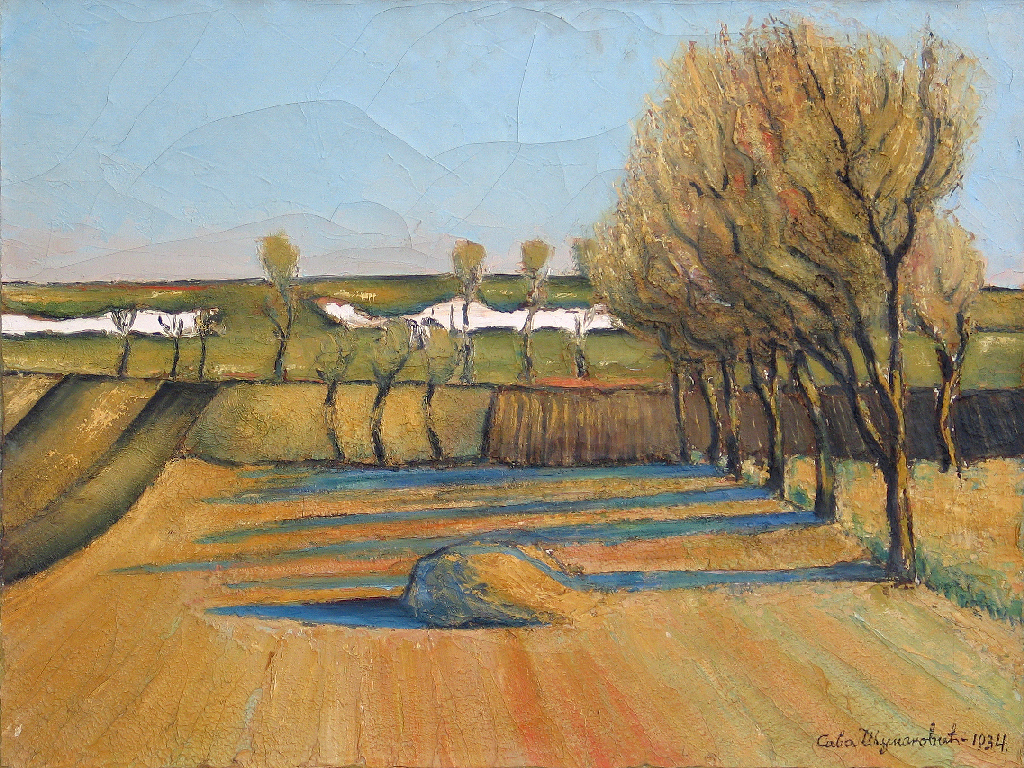
Pred proleće (1934)

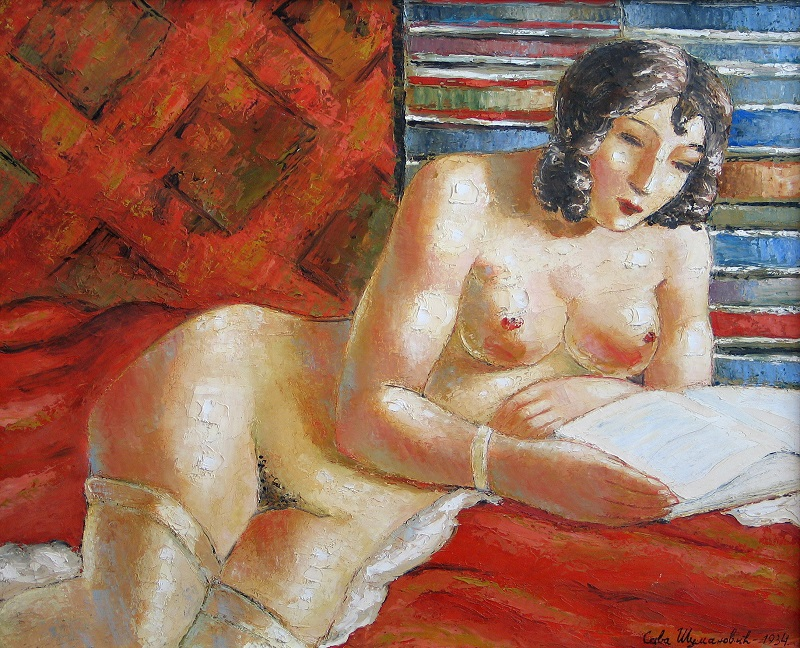
Half-lying female nude on the couch (1934)

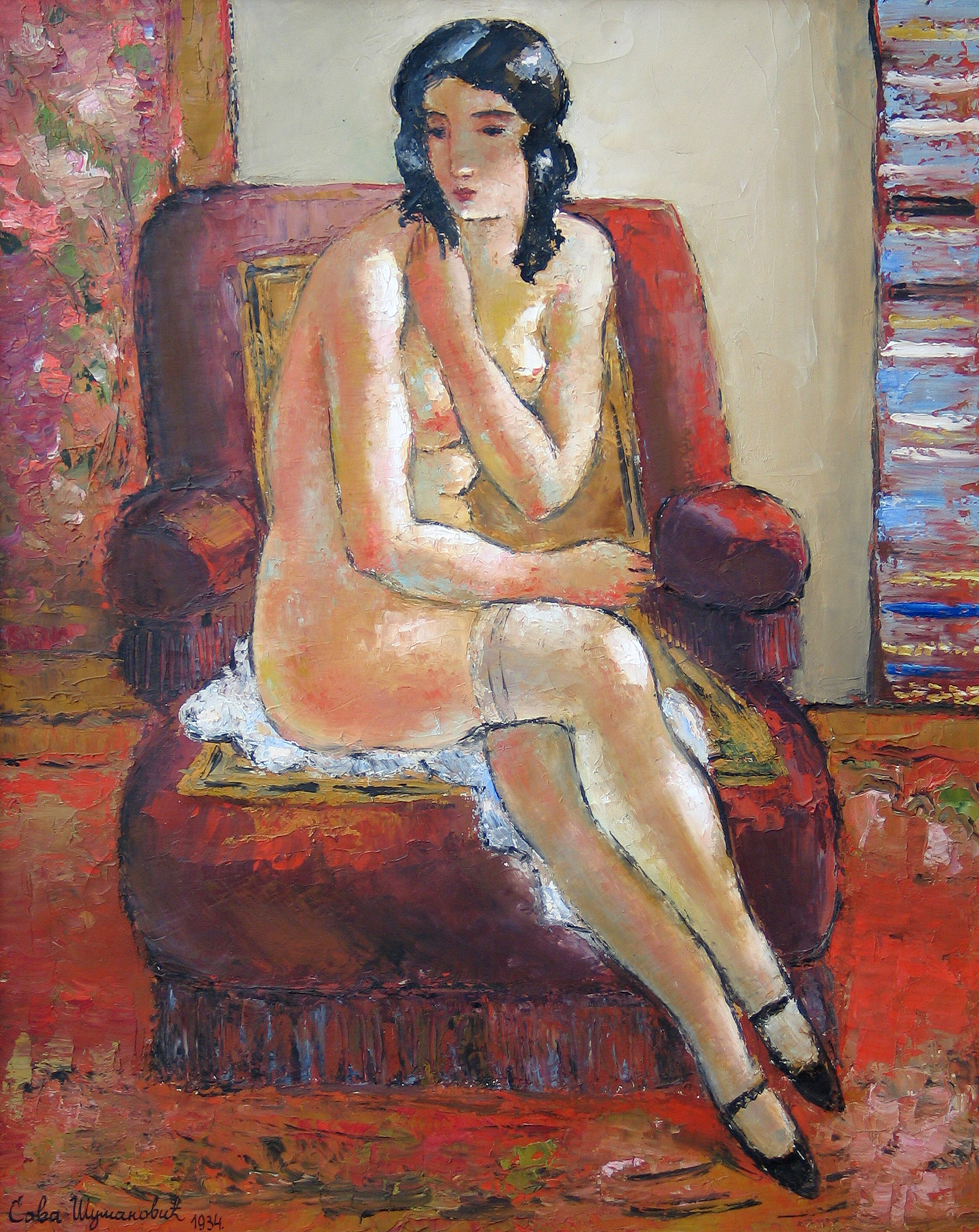
Ženski akt u crvenoj fotelji (1934)

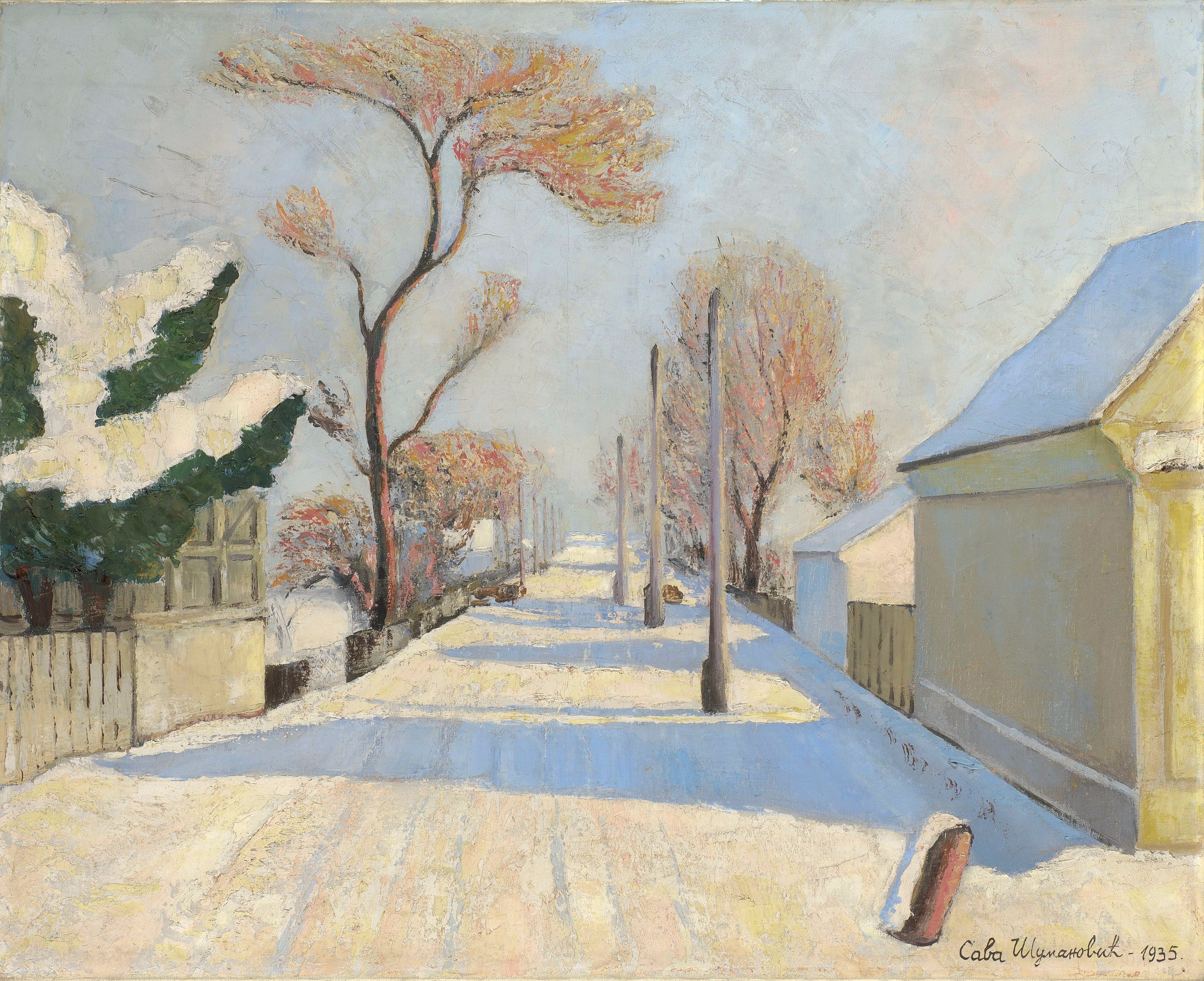
Šid under Snow (1935)

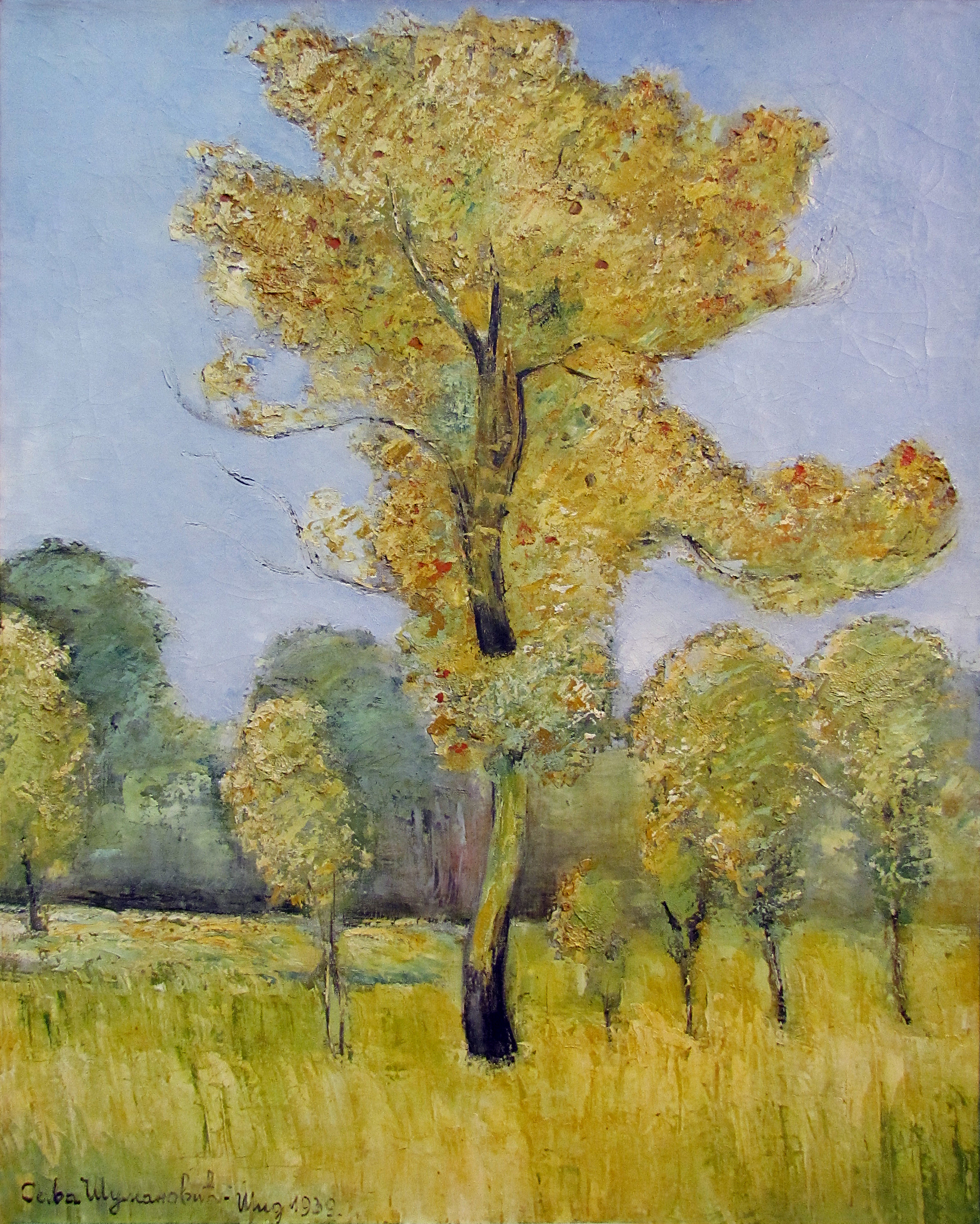
Elm (1939)
