= City Park, Zemun =

Park in Belgrade, Serbia

City Park in Zemun
- Градски парк у Земуну
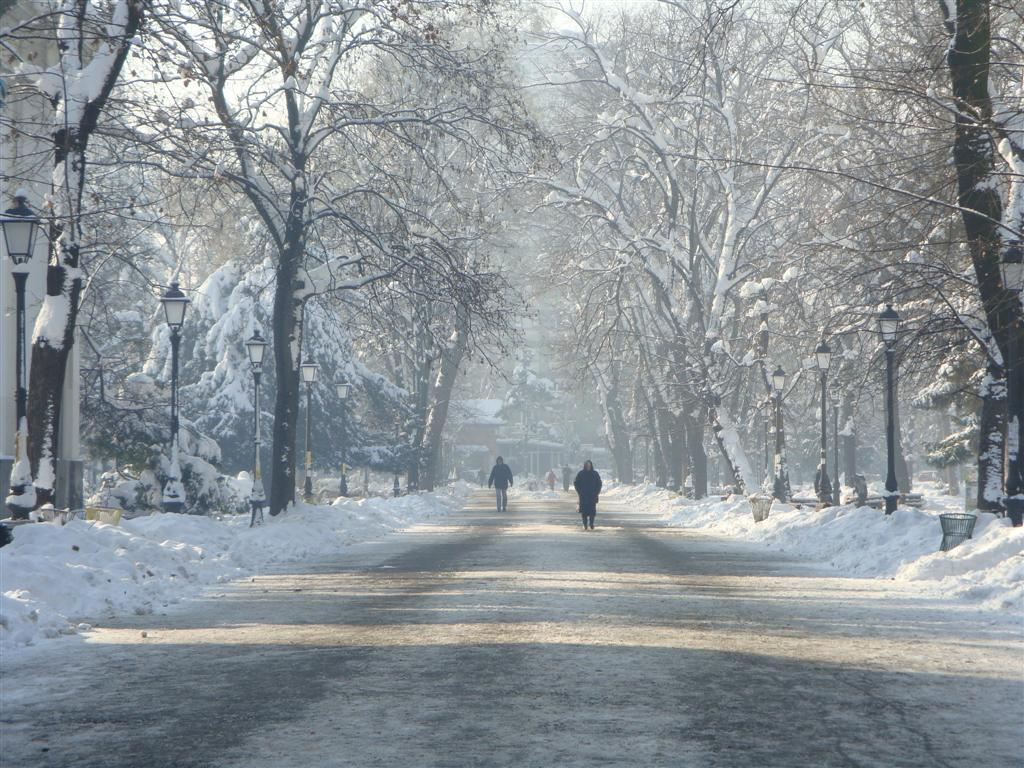
- Main promenade in winter

- Location within Belgrade
- Location: Zemun, Belgrade
- Coordinates: 44.840842°N 20.408962°E
- Open: Open all year

City Park or Zemun Park (Serbian: Градски парк у Земуну / Земунски парк) is a park in Zemun, a neighborhood of Belgrade, the capital of Serbia. Located on the rim of the Old Core of Zemun, it is considered today as one of the symbols of Zemun and one of the most beautiful parks in Belgrade.

== Location ==
The park is located in the Zemun's neighborhood of Donji Grad. It has an irregular shape and is bounded by the streets Nemanjina on the west, Nikolaja Ostrovskog and 22. Oktobra on the south, Vrtlatska while on the north the border is marked by the Savska street and the complex of the Clinical Hospital "Zemun". With the smaller, surrounding green and wooded areas between the buildings and along the streets, it forms a green belt, stretching from Zemunski Kej on the east, across Tošin Bunar on the west.

== History ==
=== Kontumac ===
On the location of modern park, from 1730 to 1871 there was Kontumac, or the quarantine hospital. As Zemun was Austro-Hungarian border town to Serbia, which was administered by the Ottoman Empire to 1815 (de facto; de jure to 1878), the quarantine was built for both the passengers and the goods coming from across the Sava river. List of notables held at Kontumac at various times includes rebellion leader Karađorđe, linguist Vuk Karadžić, writer Joakim Vujić, French poet Alphonse de Lamartine and Danish author Hans Christian Andersen.

Kontumac was built in 1730 in the southwest corner of the town. Originally, it was subordinated to another Kontumac, in Banovci, Two quarantines were connected with the deeply dug trench, large enough to be travelled by freight and passenger carts. In 1746, empress Maria Theresa ordered expansion of Zemun's Kontumac, which began to develop in the pattern of Roman-style limes, as a system of the hard-built lookouts and cabins. A system of buildings was built inside, water well, stables, etc. The quarantine complex was fortified with the pillars and planks. In 1776, the deep ditch was dug around it. As part of the preparations for the upcoming war with the Ottomans, the complex was further fortified with the high wall, with loopholes and gates, leaving only four entrances into the cantonment. Part of the wall survived at the corner of the Vrtlarska and Gundulićeva streets.

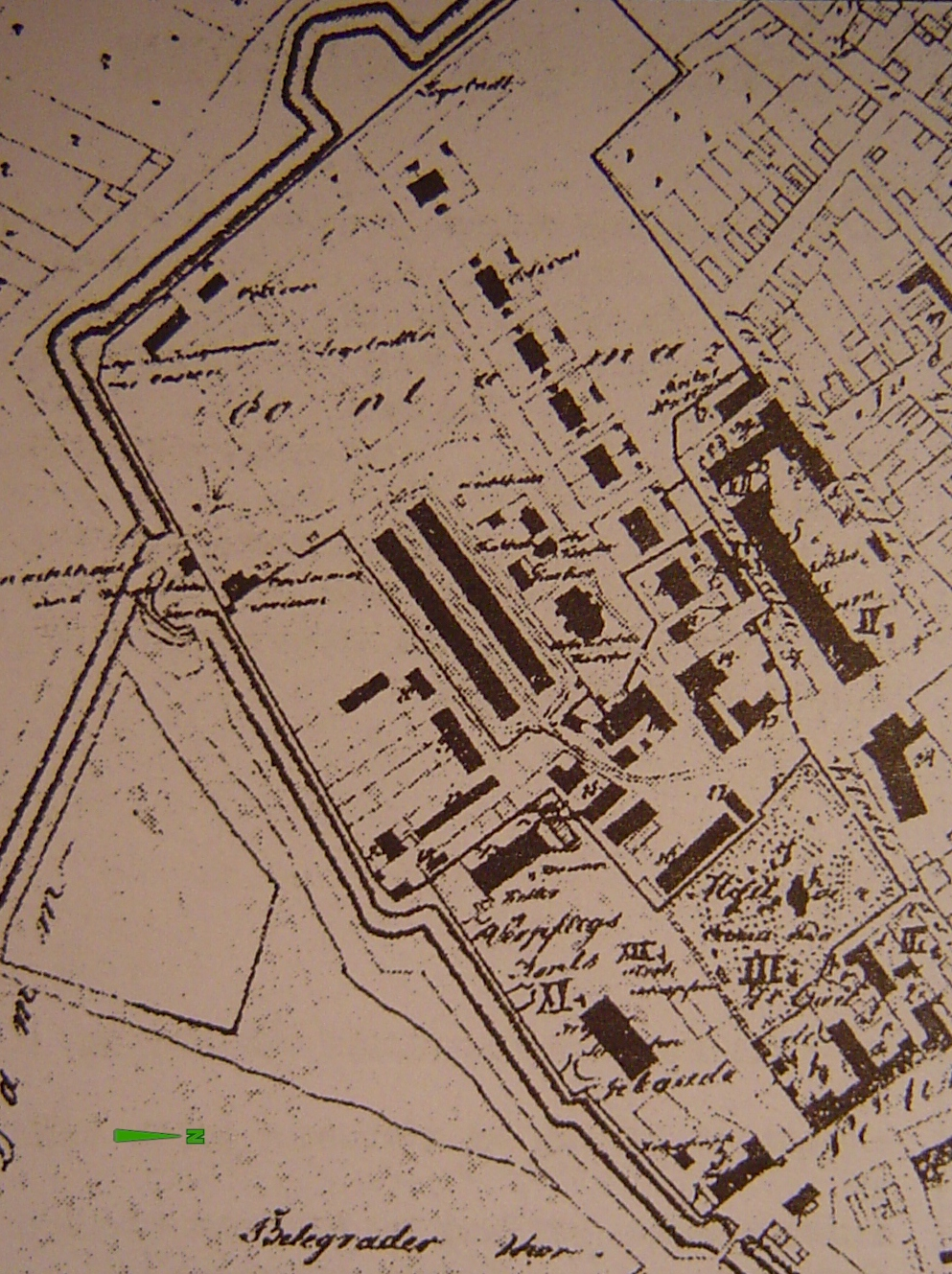
1830 map of the Kontumac

From 1787, Kontumac in Zemun took the primacy from the one in Banovci, which was bit off the main road. All passengers, goods and postal shipments coming from the Ottoman Empire were first checked in the so-called Outer Kontumac. They were checked by the physicians, but without physical touch. Main focus were plague, cholera and smallpox. Those who had symptoms were placed in the isolation in the barrack close to the Danube, which lasted up to 52 days, which was in 1780 reduced to 21. If they had milder symptoms, the patients were placed in the lazaretto, which was located where the modern Zemun Hospital is. Healthy passengers were kept in the quarantine, too, but the length of their containment depended on how close the outbreak of the disease was to the compound. Those who died in Kontumac were buried at the "plague cemetery" in Kalvarija.

An inn was on the location of present Zemun Gymnasium. It had three rooms, kitchen, taproom, grocery store, lard storage, wine cellar with the capacity of 16 tons, bakery and barn for 12 cattle. Surviving contract from 1818 shows that the innkeeper was allowed to serve food and drink both the citizens of Zemun and residents of Kontumac (Kontumaši). The Kontumaši had to pay for food and firewood for themselves. At the location of the modern children's playground, there was parlatoria, built as the log cabin without roof. It was used for talks with the quarantined people during the visitations. A supervisor, called latov was overseeing every conversation, minding the proper distance between the visitors and the quarantined. Latov also had the task of collecting money used by the quarantined to pay for the services. They didn't pay to the innkeeper directly, instead the money was thrown in the vinegar-filled vessel, and latov collected it with slotted spoon. At twilight, the Kontumac guardsmen would close from the outside both the inn and the four gates of the entire complex.

Merchandise and post shipments were originally kept in the special storage, before especially picked personnel would check it. Coffee, rice and other grainy goods were unpacked and placed outdoors, under the canopy for three weeks of aeration. Textile wrapping bags were immersed in the water and if they couldn't be cleaned, they were burned. Wool, fur, raw silk, yarn, fabric, leather, etc., were kept up to six weeks as the "diseases easily caught on it". The most dangerous was the examination of the cotton. Especially selected workers were immersing naked arms into the cotton as soon as it would arrive, mingling it. They were then kept in the quarantine to see if the disease will develop. Though rare, deaths of the cotton examiners were recorded. Gold and hard objects were rinsed in salt water and soap foam. Letters were cleaned with vinegar at first, but this proved as the bad solution. Instead, the letters were later opened and held above the vinegar vapor which allowed Austrian state to spy on every correspondence claiming quarantine laws.

However, being a border town Zemun also became an important trading post. Hence, the area of Kontumac was also a duty free zone between Austria and Turkey, and later Serbia. The zone contained rows of warehouses where goods were stored and sanitized prior to taxation. Apart from lazaretto, it also contained quarters for the people during their stay in the zone. Having large number of people at one place, hospitality and catering services developed around the zone, and numerous kafanas were opened, with colorful names: Kod Zlatnog Krsta ("At Golden Cross"), Kod Zlatnog Točka ("At Golden Wheel"), Kod Cara ("At the Emperor"), Kod Zlatnog Slona ("At Golden Elephant"), Kod Zlatnog Sunca ("At Golden Sun"), etc.

=== Park ===
Map of the park

Partial shutting down of the Kontumac complex began on 1 May 1869. Zemun was granted a free royal city status in 1871, and the Kontumac was officially closed, though successive closing of the quarantine continued until 1883. Majority of the objects within the former complex were demolished in the 1870s and the 1880s. Apart from two surviving churches, two longest surviving buildings later hosted the district administration and gendarmerie. They were demolished in 1953.

In 1875 the lot became a municipal property and the decision to turn it into the promenade and the park was made. The park was an idea of Ivan Perković, who also conducted the works on adapting the terrain into the park. The construction began in 1880 when the green area around the Great Realschule (modern Zemun Gymnasium) was formed. Original park was formed in the next 6 years and was officially open in 1886. For a while, it was named Elizabet-Park, after the Elisabeth, Empress consort of Austria, while it got its present name after the World War I. However, the forming of the park into its present size and layout lasted for decades and was finally completed in 1931. The seedlings were supplied by the well known Viscount's Nursery Garden from the town of Ilok.

The park was scheduled for reconstruction in 2008 but it was postponed. A thorough reconstruction began in October 2017. The reconstructed area occupies 2.38 ha (5.9 acres) and covered the reconstruction of all pathways, fences and stairways replacement of the benches, decorative lights on additional monuments and construction of another children's playground which will be separated from the rest of the park with the newly formed wall of hedge. The reconstruction was finished on 4 May 2018.

== Characteristics ==
The park covers an area of 7.72 ha (19.1 acres). It is populated by the both deciduous and conifer trees. 15 individual trees are protected by the law. In total, there are 1,300 individual trees in the park. In April 2022, it was announced that plans are to declare the entire park a natural monument by the end of 2022.

In 1932, the building of the Faculty of Agronomy was constructed in the southern section of the park. A meteorological equipment was also located in the park. The meteorological weather station column was placed in October 1848, predating the park. Apart from being "an ornament of the park" later, it was useful for the townspeople as he after the meteorology progressed, gave the basic weather info on daily basis: temperature, atmospheric pressure, humidity, soil temperature and the Danube's water level. It was damaged in the 1944 allied bombing and was dismantled after October 1944.

There are numerous sculptures and monuments in the park. Among them, in 1933 a monument to Lamartine was erected on the location between the two churches in the park. It commemorated Lamartine's stay in the Kontumac in 1833, during his travels to the East which he published in 1835 as the "Voyage en Orient". In 1946, two Partisan monuments were erected, commemorating the fightings with the German occupational forces during the World War II: the "Bombard" (by Vanja Radauš) and the "Hostage" (by Boris Kalin). In front of the Orthodox church, there is a monument known as khachkar a gift from the people of Armenia to the people of Yugoslavia after the help from the Yugoslav pilots during the aftermath of the disastrous 1988 Armenian earthquake, which struck on 7 December 1988. The monument, in the form of a traditional Armenian memorial stele with carved crosses, was sculptured by Ruben Nalbandian. It is one of only two khachkars in Serbia. In 2004, a bust of poet Branko Radičević was dedicated.

Remains of the Roman sarcophagus are exhibited between the gymnasium and the military barrack. Archaeologist Josip Brunschmidt was the first to describe it, in 1895, when it was already exhibited in the park. It is 2.18 m (7 ft 2 in) long, 1.4 m (4 ft 7 in) wide and 73 cm (29 in) tall. It was originally discovered in the foothills of the Gardoš hill. At the time, the pieces of the lid were located in the Magistrates building. The sarcophagus is made of green sandstone, without any ornaments, while the lid is made of white stone, similar to that from Tašmajdan quarry in Belgrade. Rim of the lid is ornamented with sculptured human heads on the each corner and on the mid-lengths of the longer sides. It was fully restored in December 2020.

There are three drinking fountains in the park and several protected individual trees of European yew and four groups of Caucasian walnuts. There is also one preserved Artesian well.

== Buildings ==
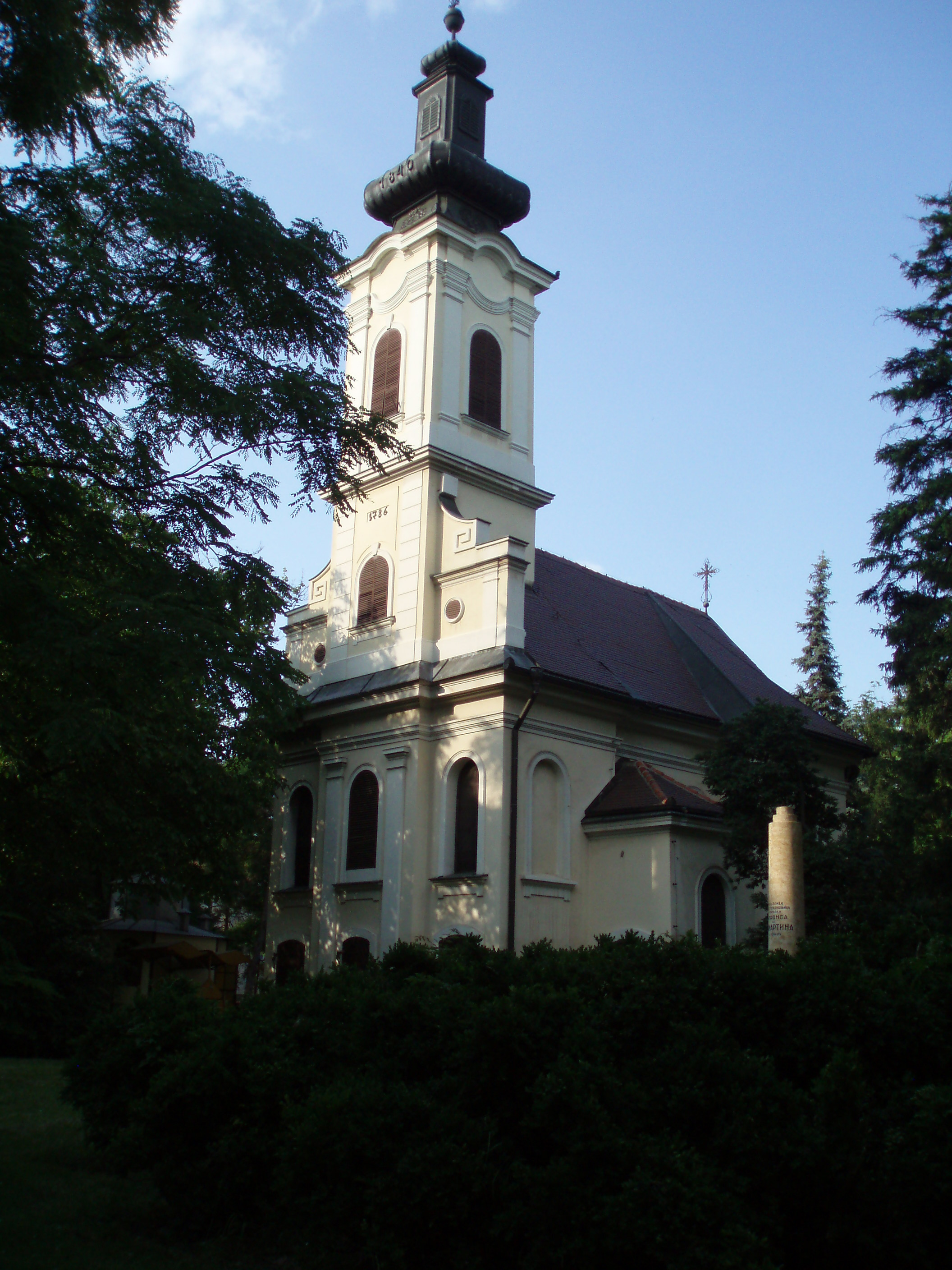
Church of the Saint Archangels Michael and Gabriel

Apart from Clinical Hospital "Zemun" and the Faculty of Agronomy, there are other important Zemun's buildings surrounding the park or within its borders: "Svetozar Miletić" and "Majka Jugovića" elementary schools, "Kosta Manojlović" music school, Zemun Gymnasium, Pinki Hall, Franciscan monastery of Saint John the Baptist and monastery of Sisters of Mercy. Within the park, there rare two churches, an Orthodox monastery of the Saint Archangels Michael and Gabriel and Roman Catholic chapel of the Saint Roch. Both churches were built in the temperate Baroque style for the people who were spending time in the Kontumac and were protected as the cultural monuments in 1966.

Pinki Hall was built in 1974, on the location of the former National Hall of King Alexander. Construction of an underground garage with 150 parking spaces at Pinki Hall began in August 2022. It is being built after the mid-1970s plan for the park area. The plan had to be revised, and the planned garage was reduced by half, and to only one underground level. Deeper digging proved unfeasible because of the high level of underground waters due to the proximity of the Danube. In June 2023 the deadline for the works was set for the early 2024.

=== Church of the Saint Archangels Michael and Gabriel ===
The church was built in 1786, on the location of an older, small church. It was built by Teodor Toša Apostolović (1745–1810), with his personal funds. Apostolović was a Serbian merchant and philanthropist who donated the land between Bežanija and Zemun to the Serbian church municipality of Zemun, of which he was a president when the church was built. The area and the subsequent neighborhood and the main street in it ar today called Tošin Bunar ("Toša's Well") after him. After the Kontumac was disbanded, the church lost its importance.

After a large number of Russian White émigrés settled in Yugoslavia in the 1920s, especially in Belgrade and Zemun, the church was revitalized and until 1945 served as a Russian church. Within the new Communist regime after 1945, the church was largely neglected and unkempt. By 1981, the hieromonk Filaret Mićović took over the management and restored the church. However, in the process the original frescoes were completely destroyed while the church even served as a weaponry storage. Mićović obtained the permit to demolish the church completely and build a new temple covering 3,000 m^{2} (32,000 sq ft) instead. When Patriarch Pavle was elected as the new head of the Serbian Orthodox Church in 1991, he annulled the permit, preserving the old church.

=== Church of the Saint Roch ===
The church was built in 1836 and, just like its Orthodox counterpart in the park, it was built on the foundation of an older chapel. It was designed by Joseph Felber, who also projected the Zemun's town hall, Magistrate in Zemun and another, Orthodox church of the Holy Trinity. After the Kontumac was turned into the park, and especially after the World War II, the church lost its importance. Today it is operational only occasionally.

== Gallery ==
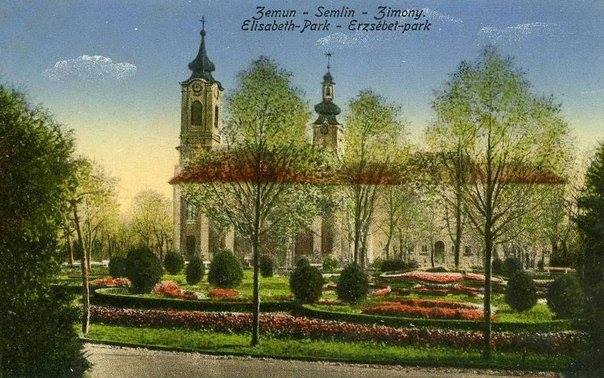
Postcard from c. 1900

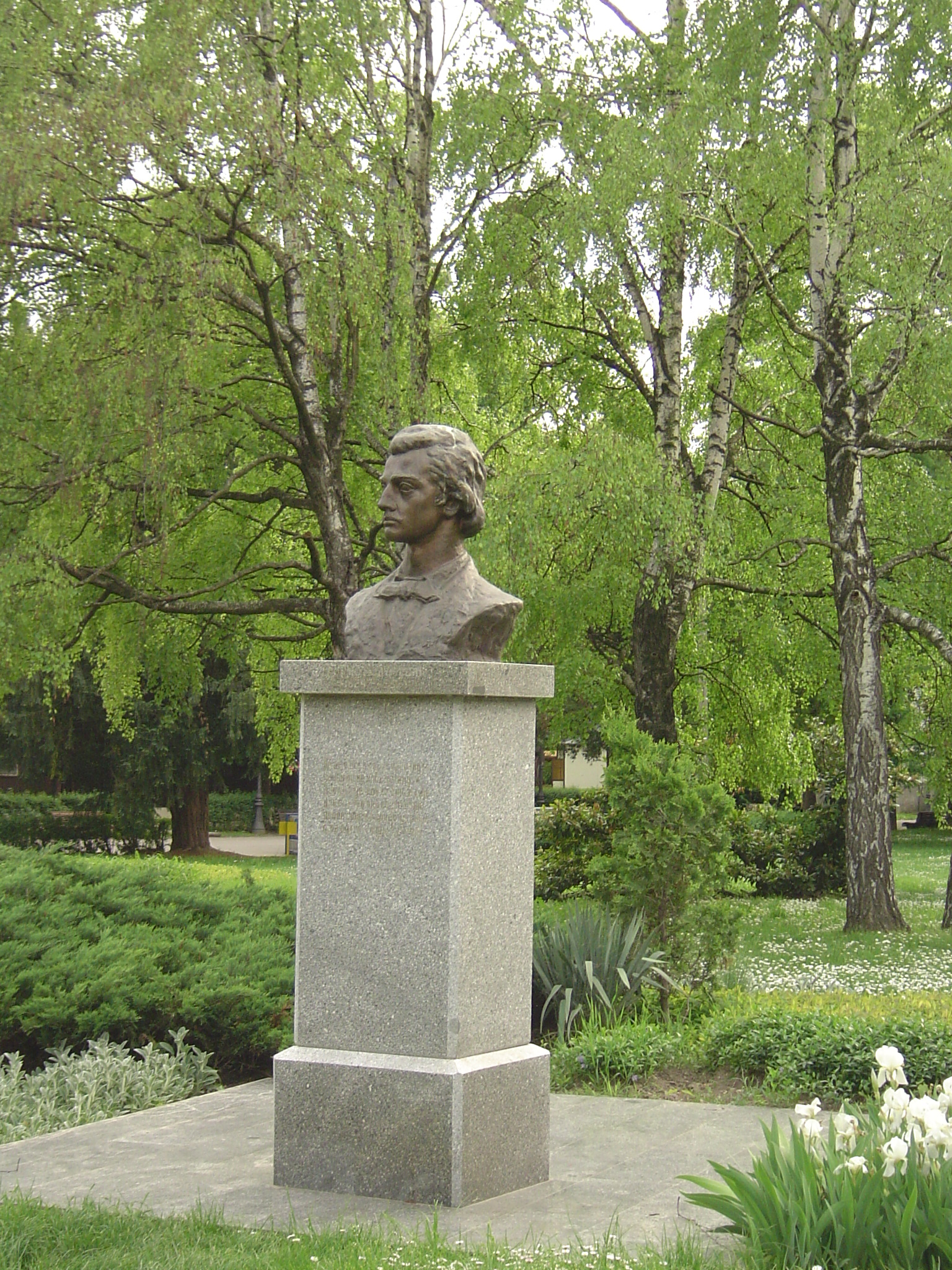
Bust of Branko Radičević

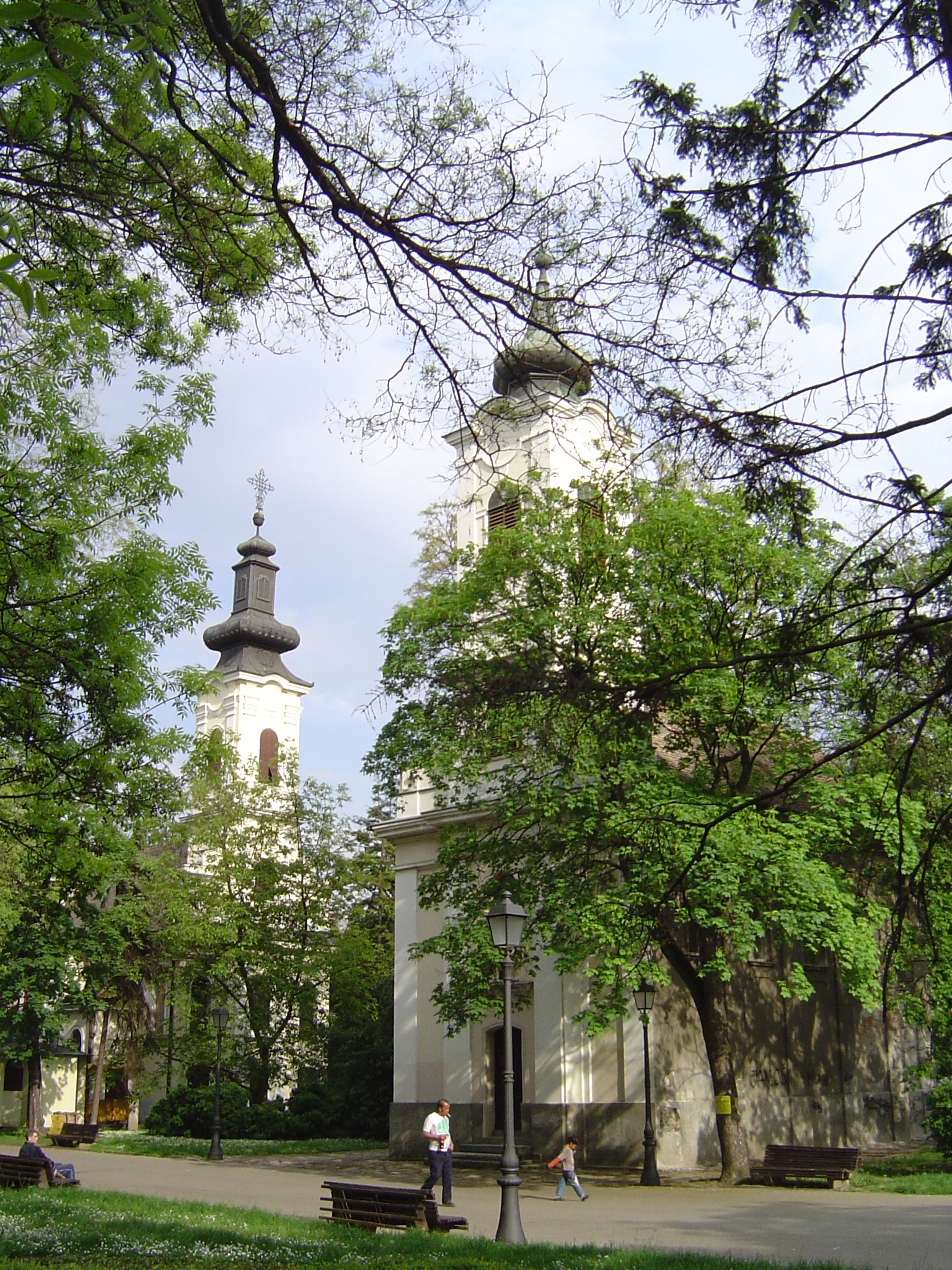
Serbian Orthodox (left) and Roman Catholic (right) churches

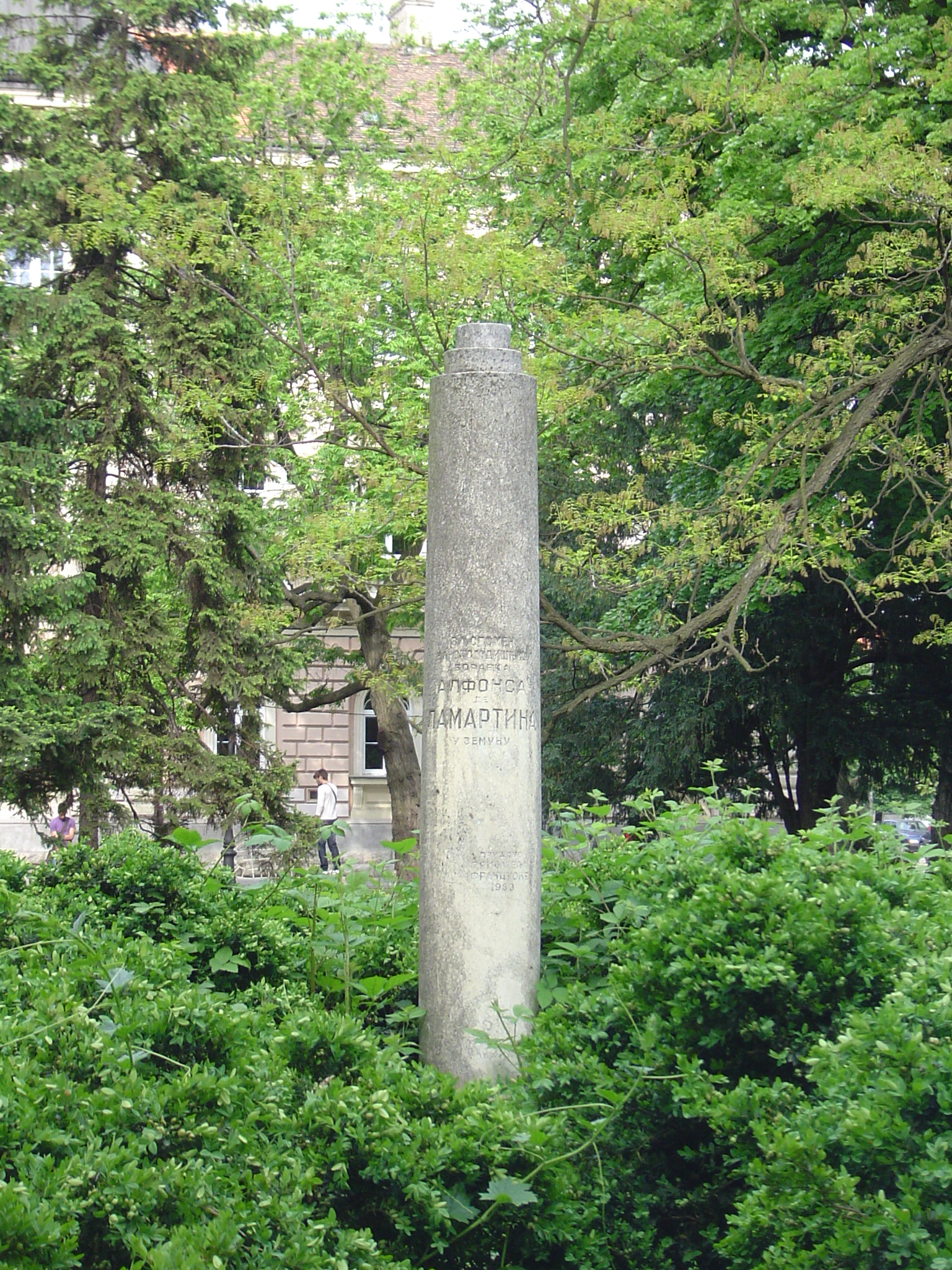
Memorial to Alphonse de Lamartine

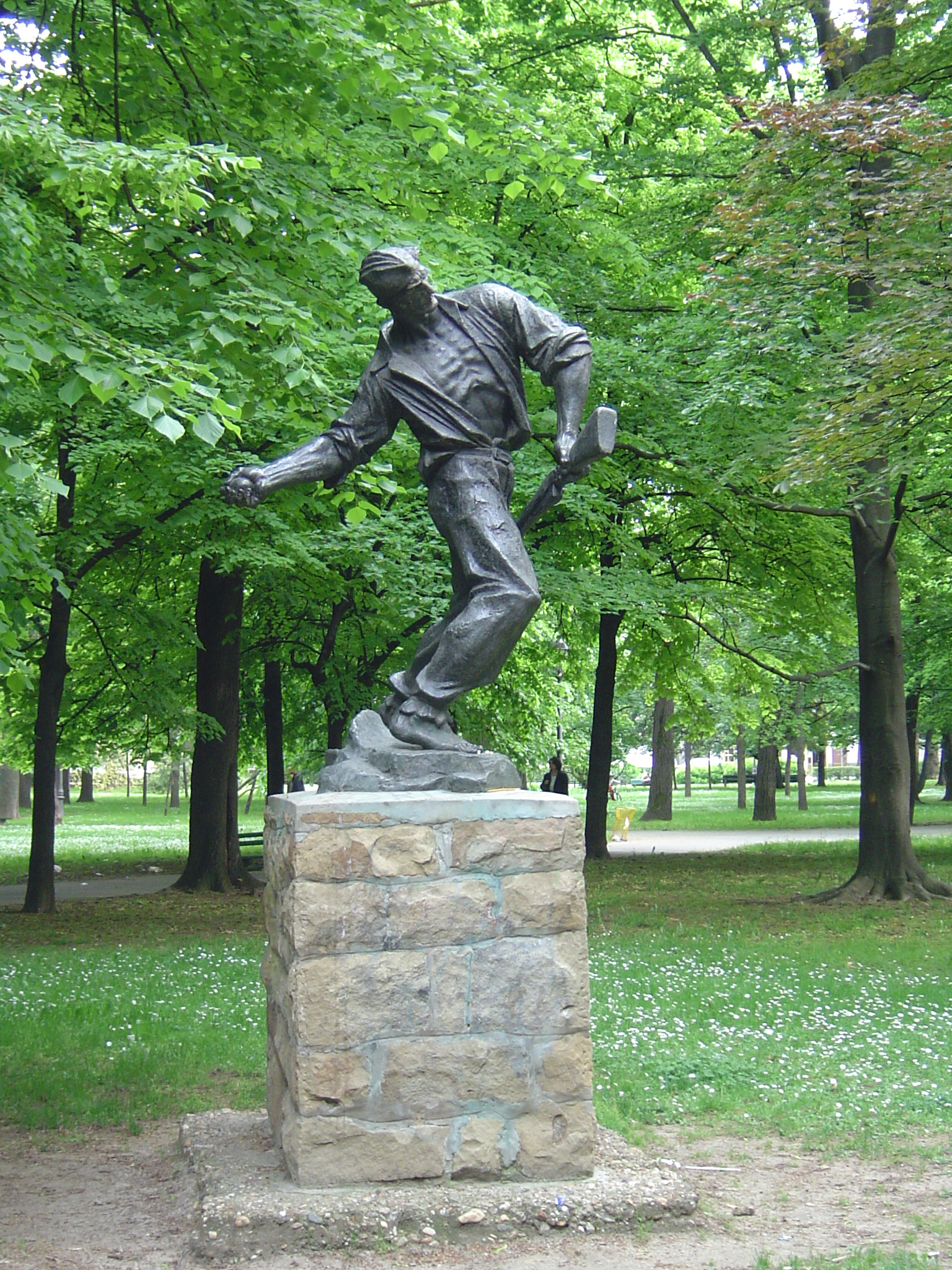
Monument to the Partisan bombard

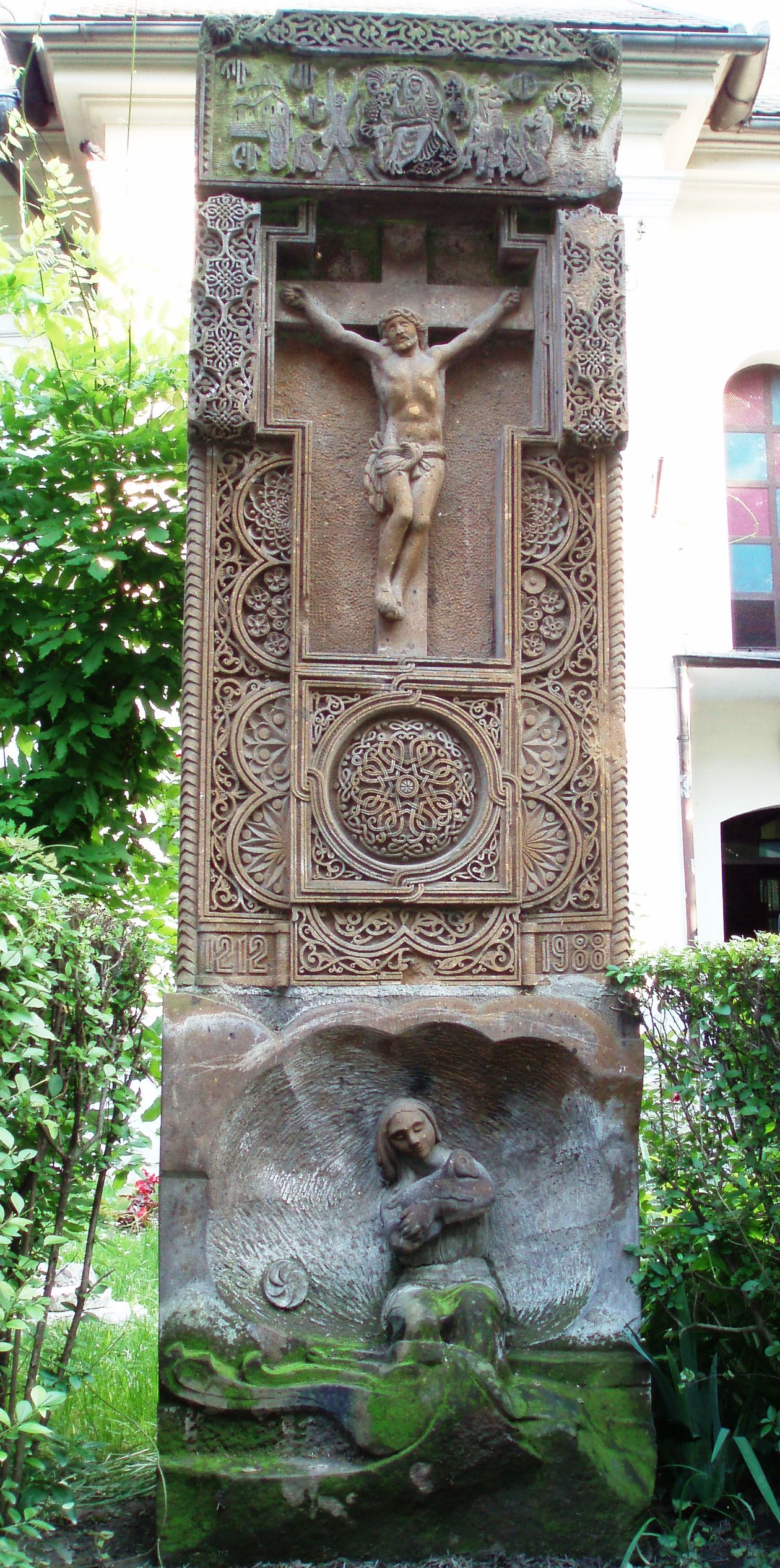
Monument of the gratitude of the Armenian people

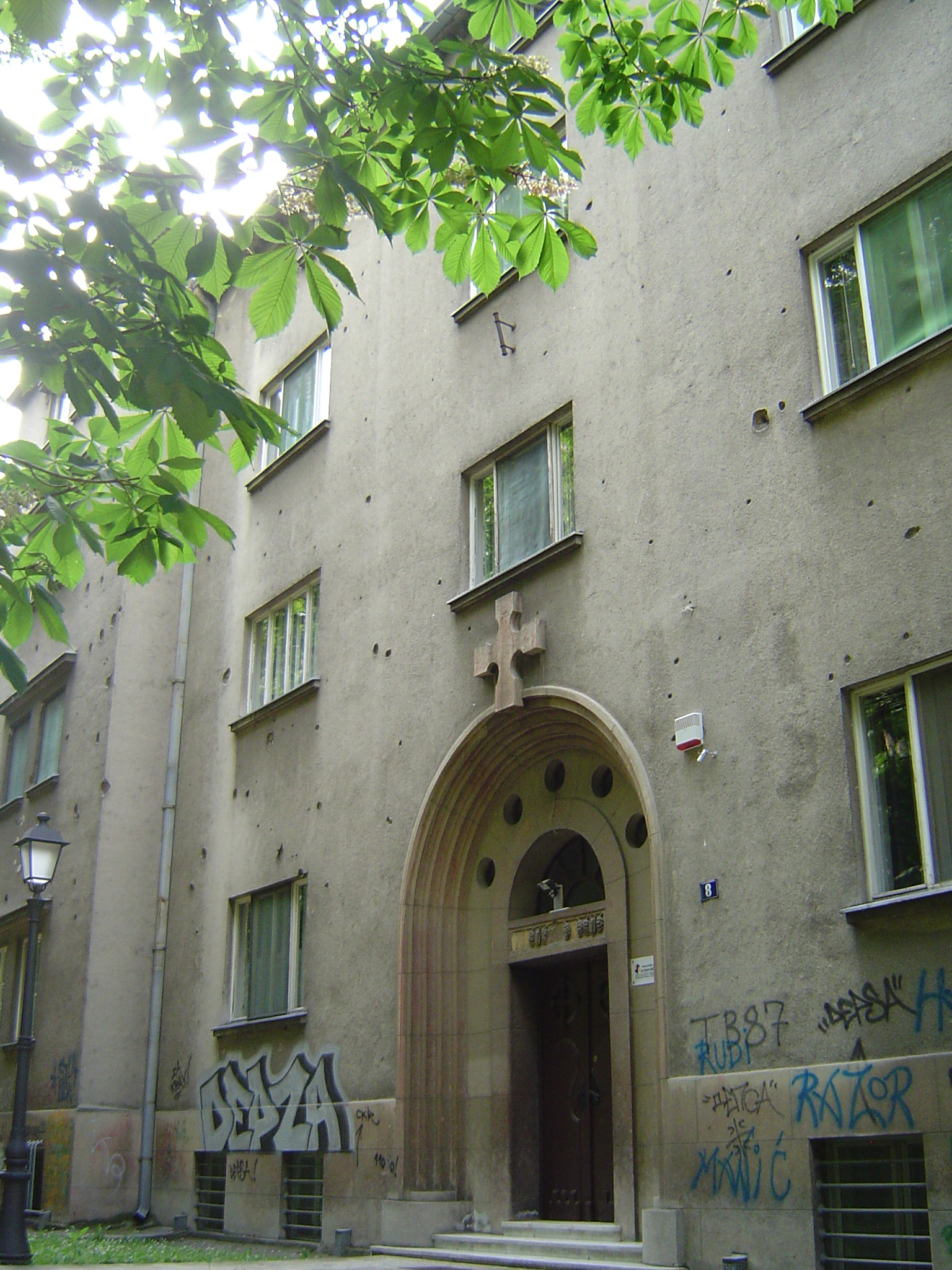
Monastery of the Sisters of Mercy

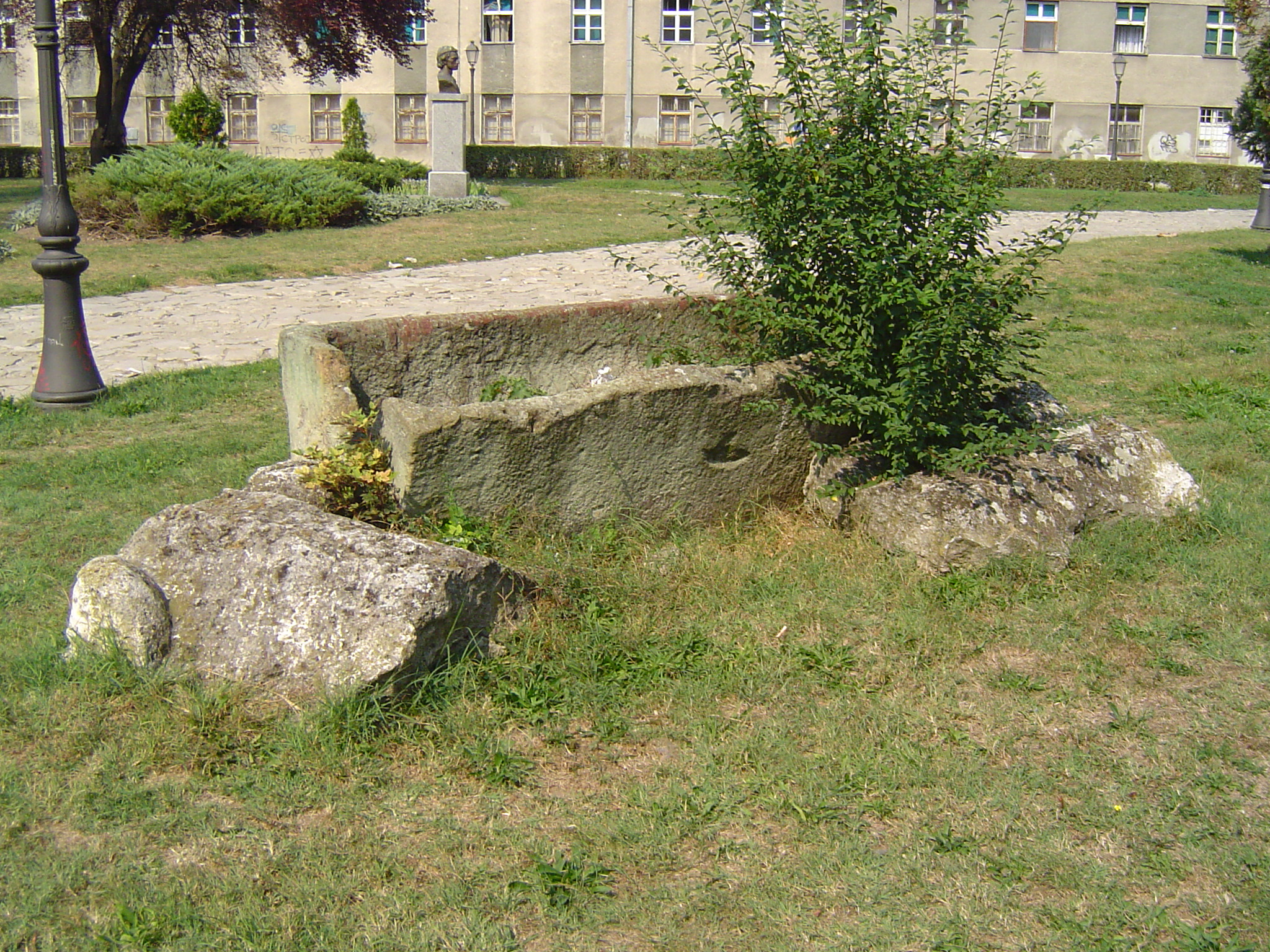
Remains of the Roman sarcophagus

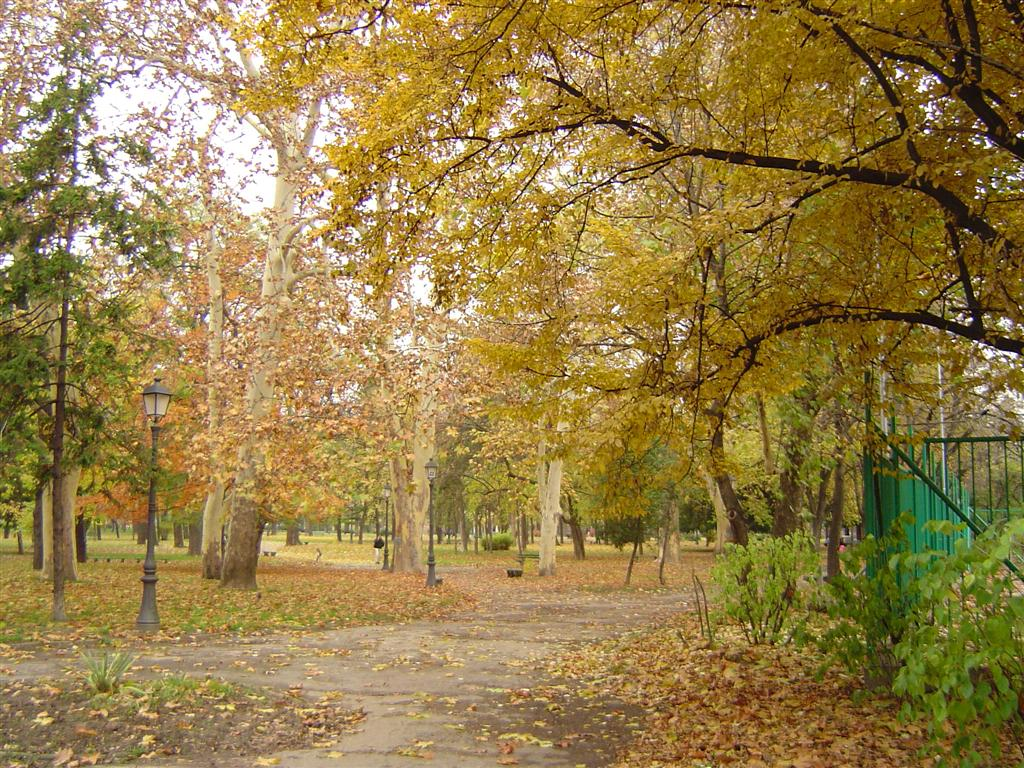
Park in autumn 1

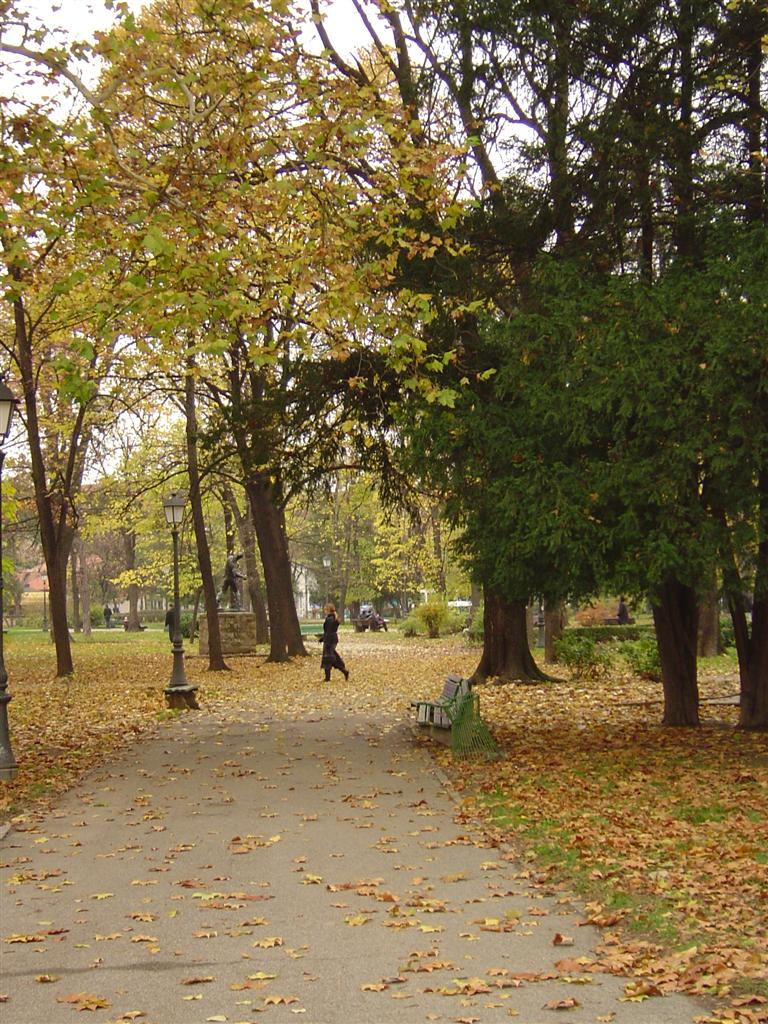
Park in autumn 2

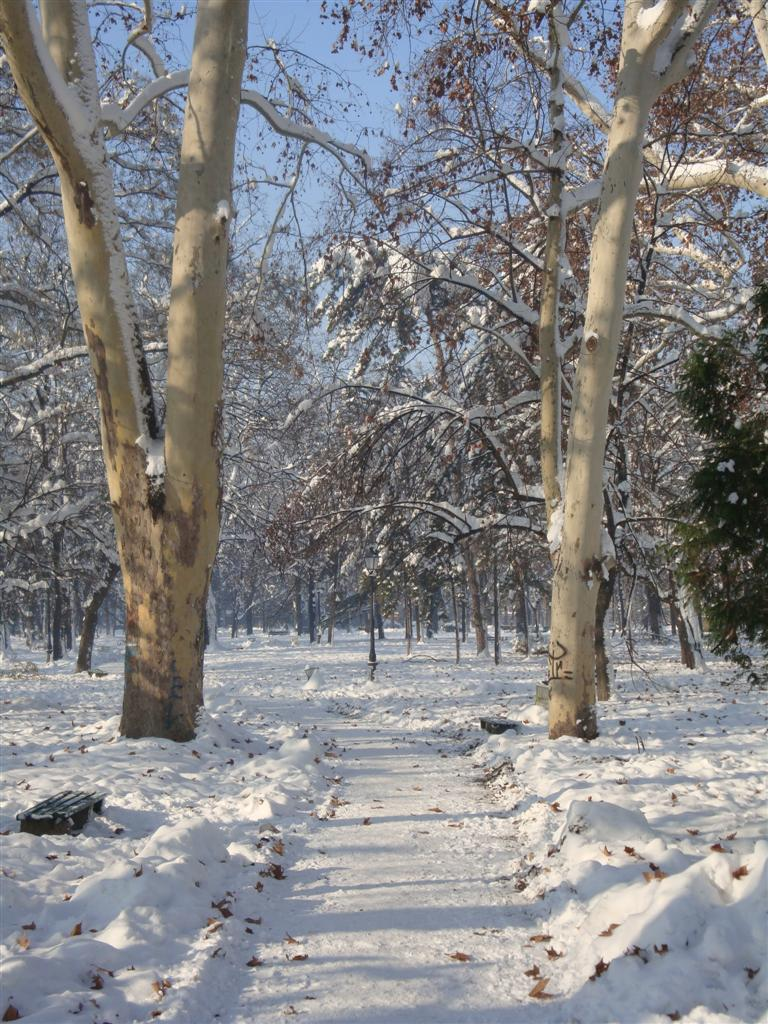
Park in winter

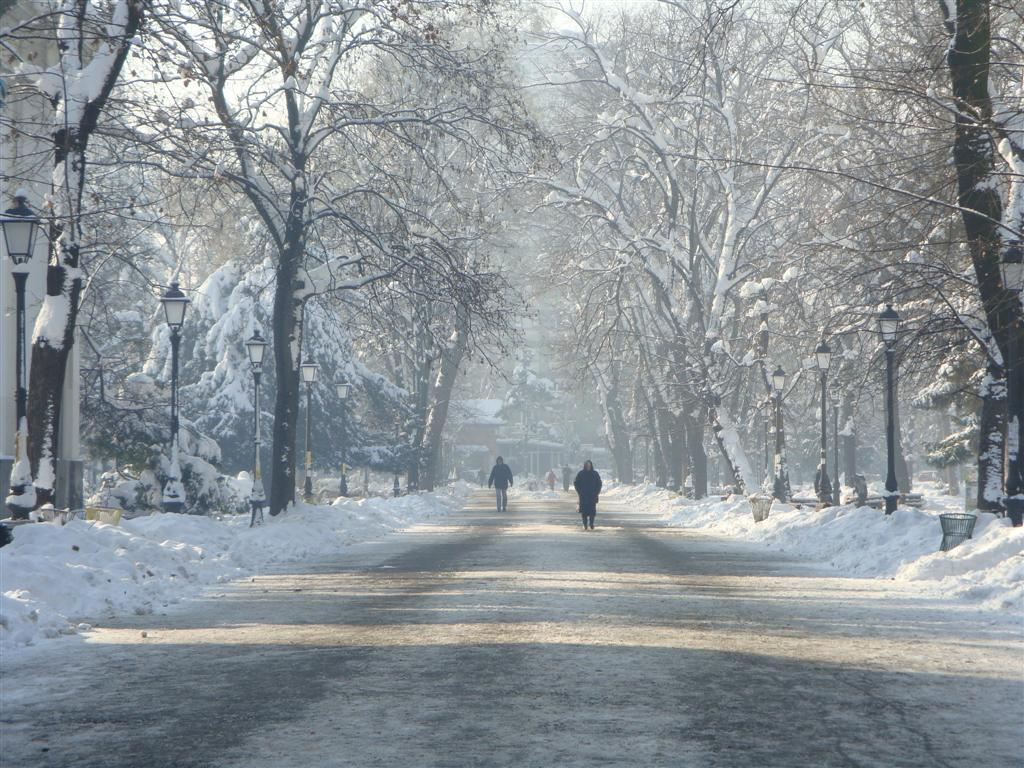
Main alley

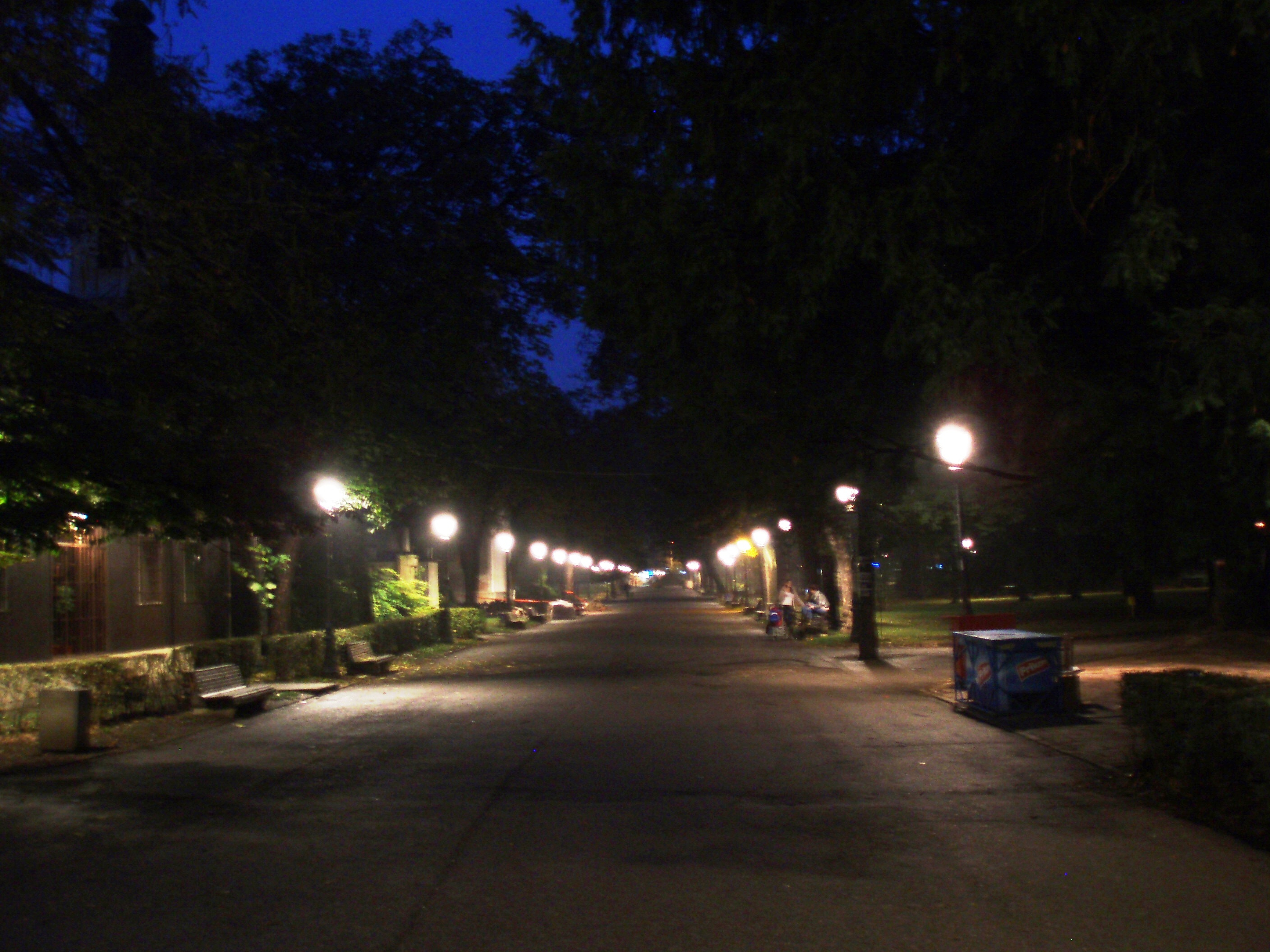
Main alley at night

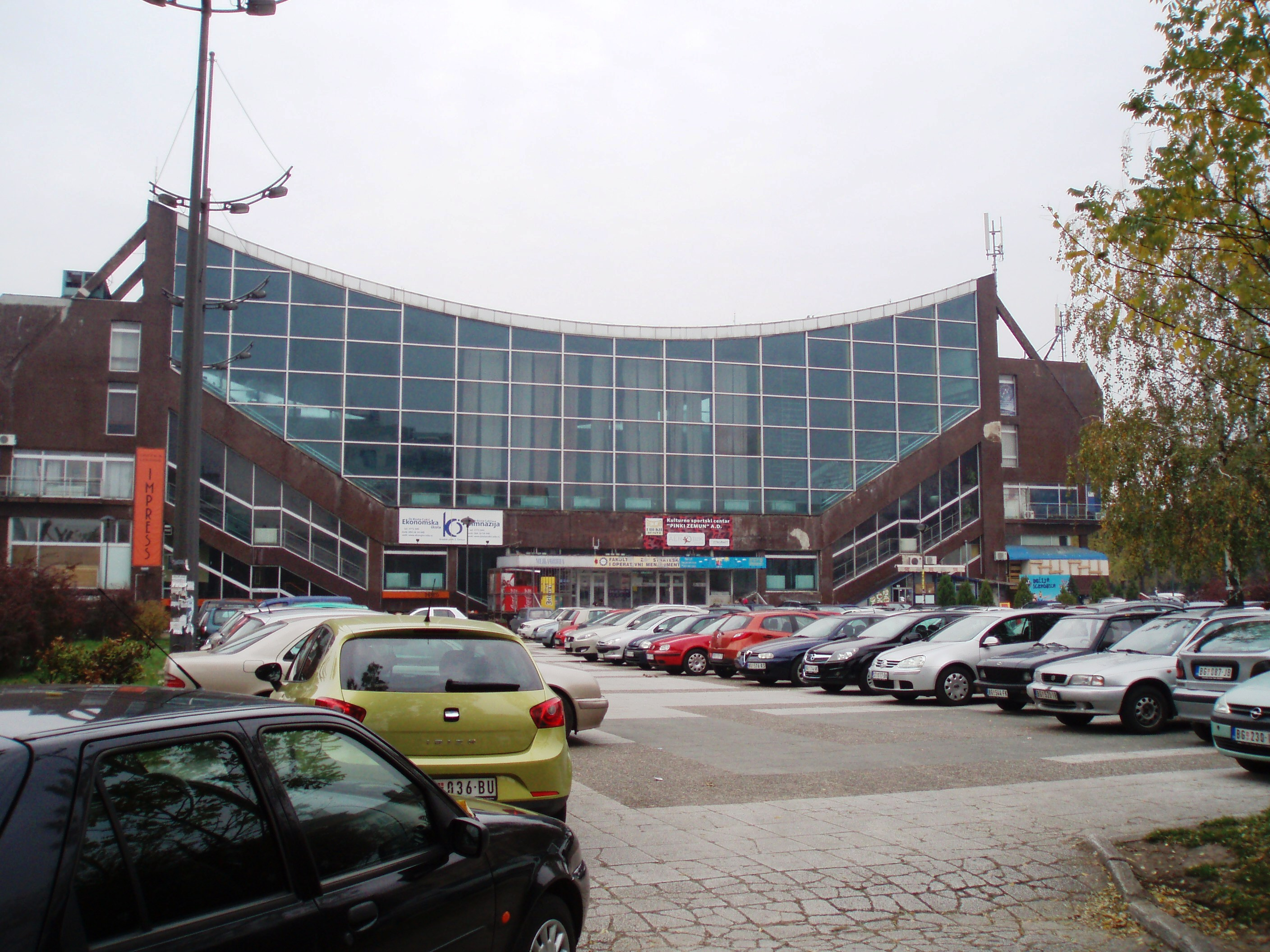
Pinki Hall

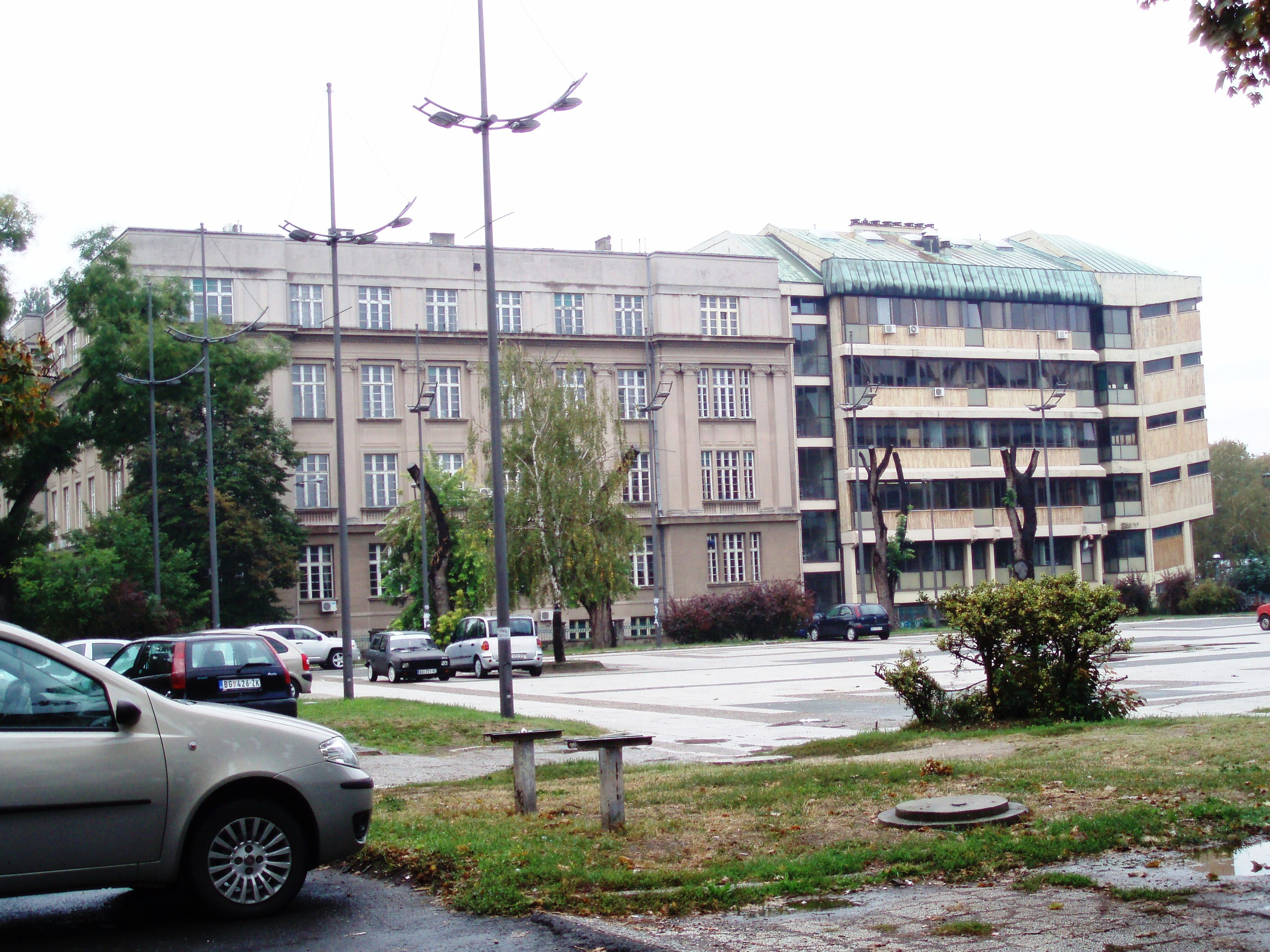
Faculty of Agriculture

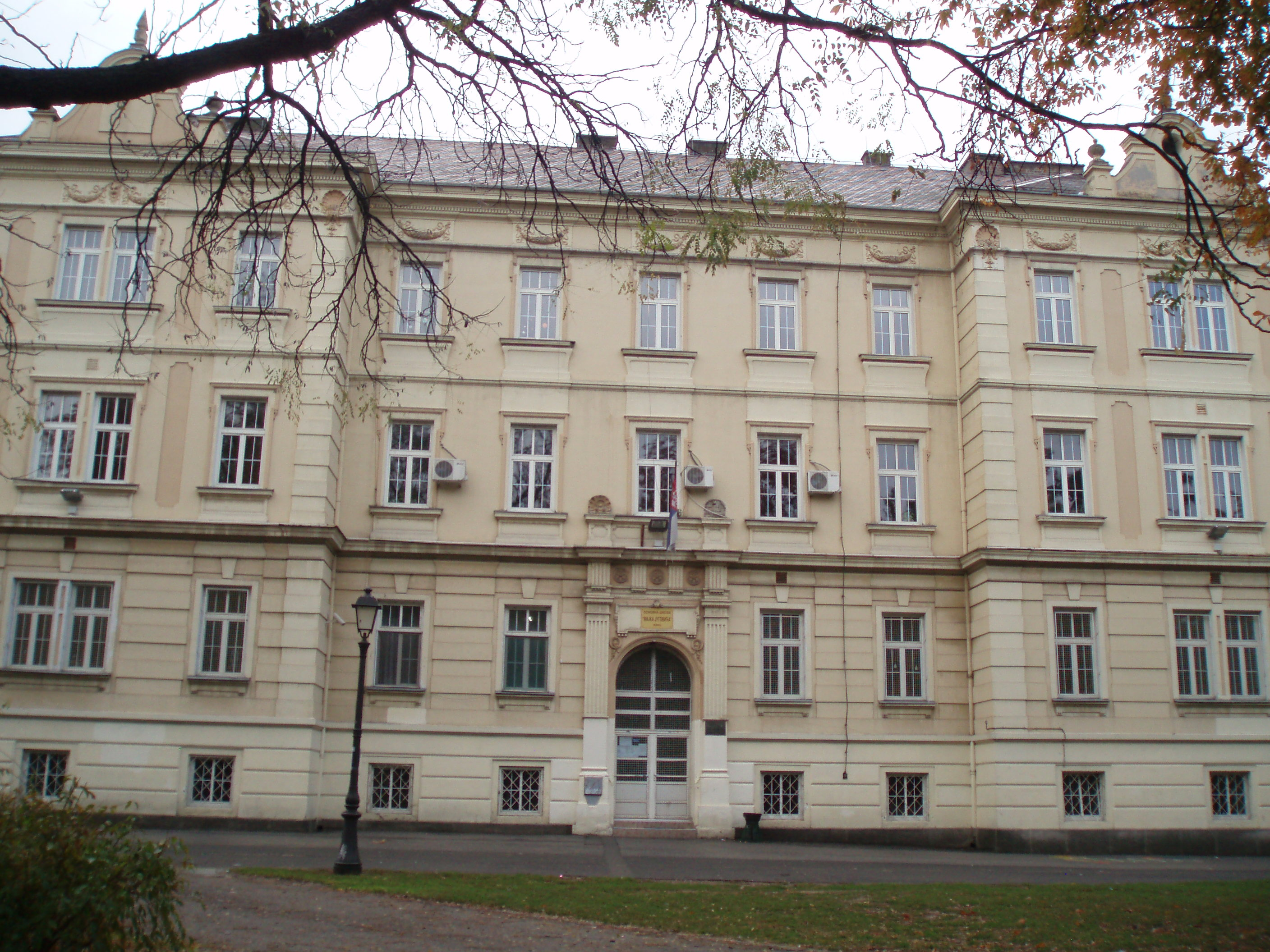
"Majka Jugovića" elementary school

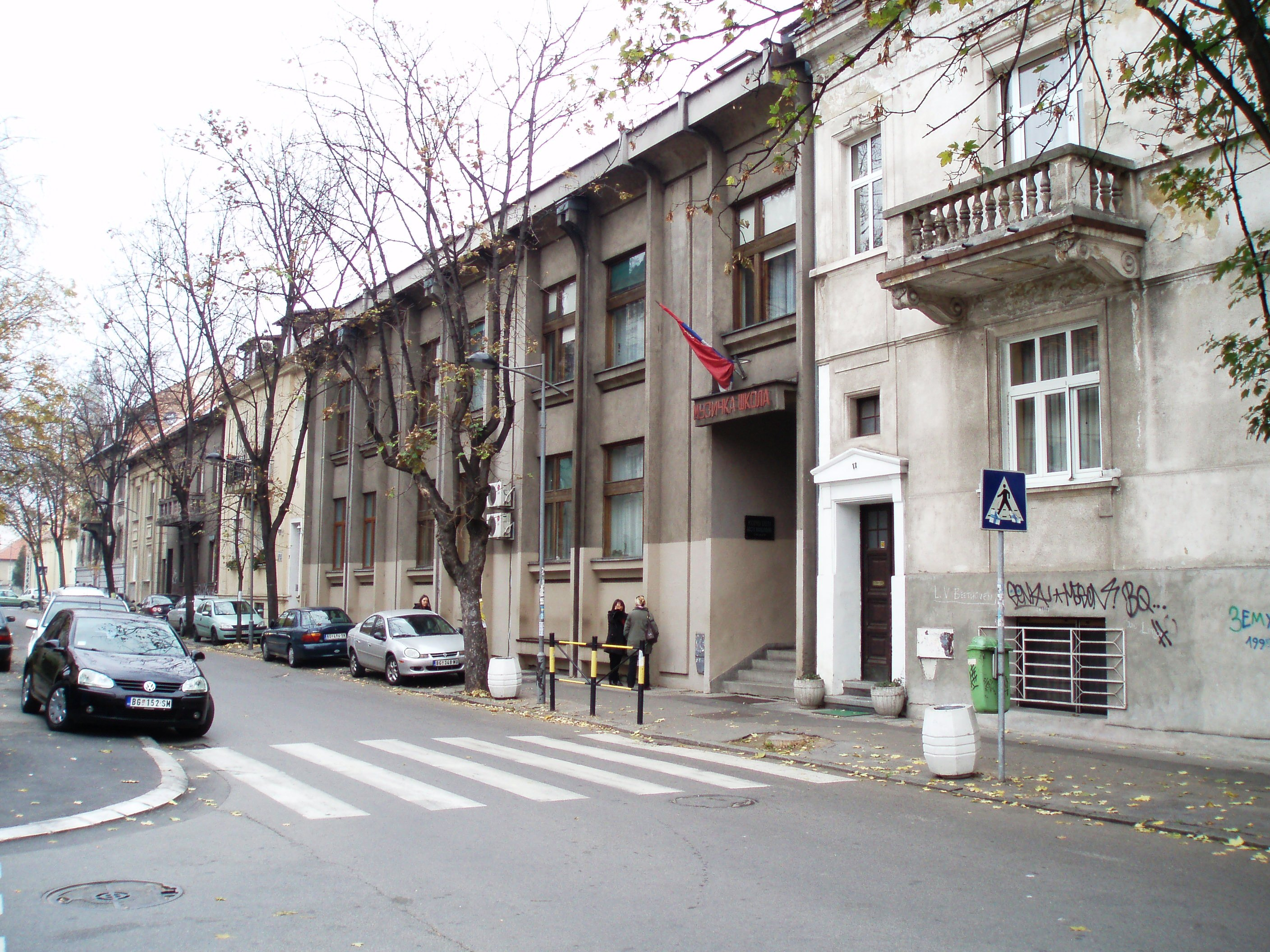
"Kosta Manojlović" elementary school

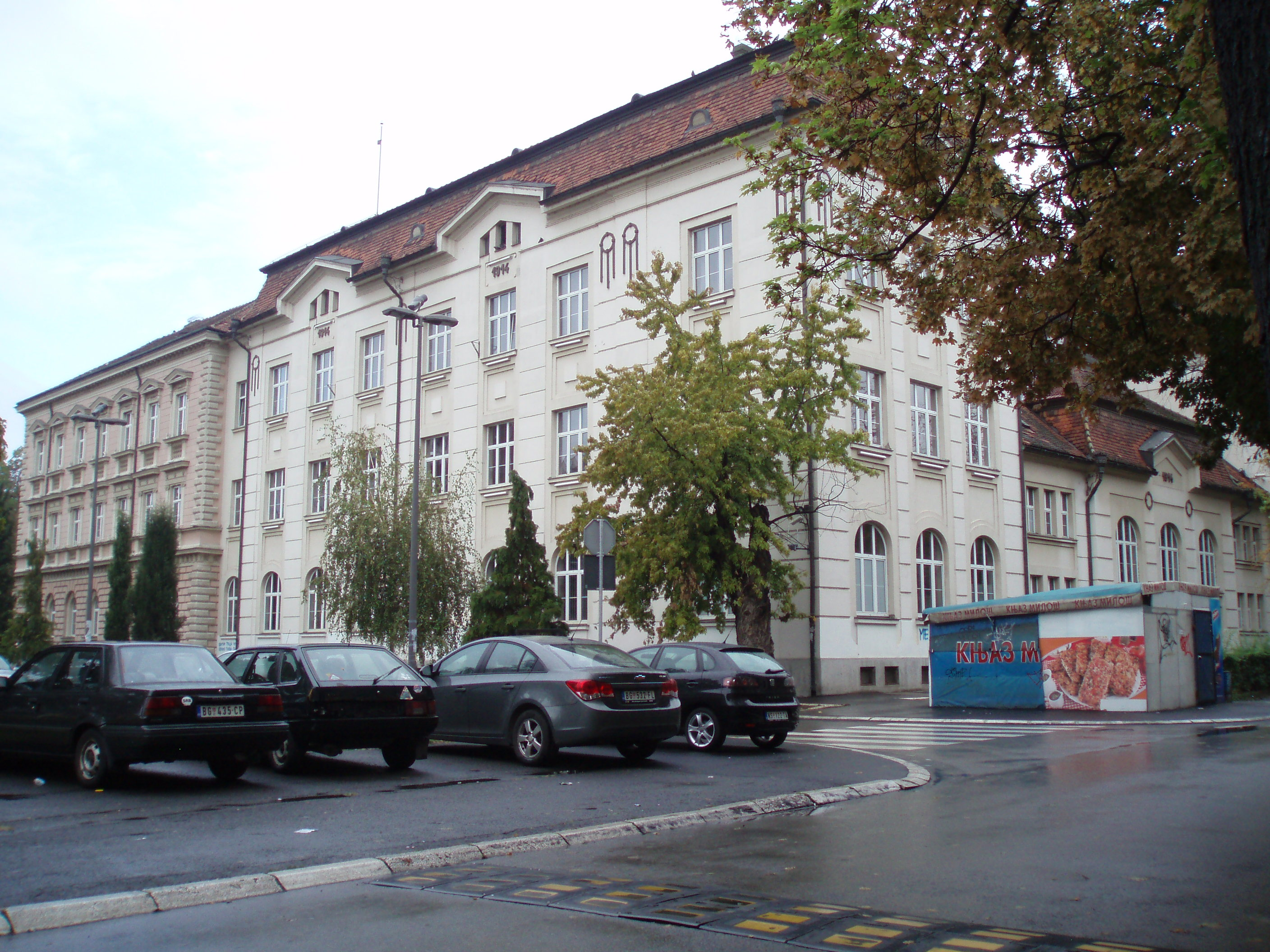
Zemun Gymnasium
