= Zemun Gymnasium =

- Земунска гимназија Zemunska gimnazija
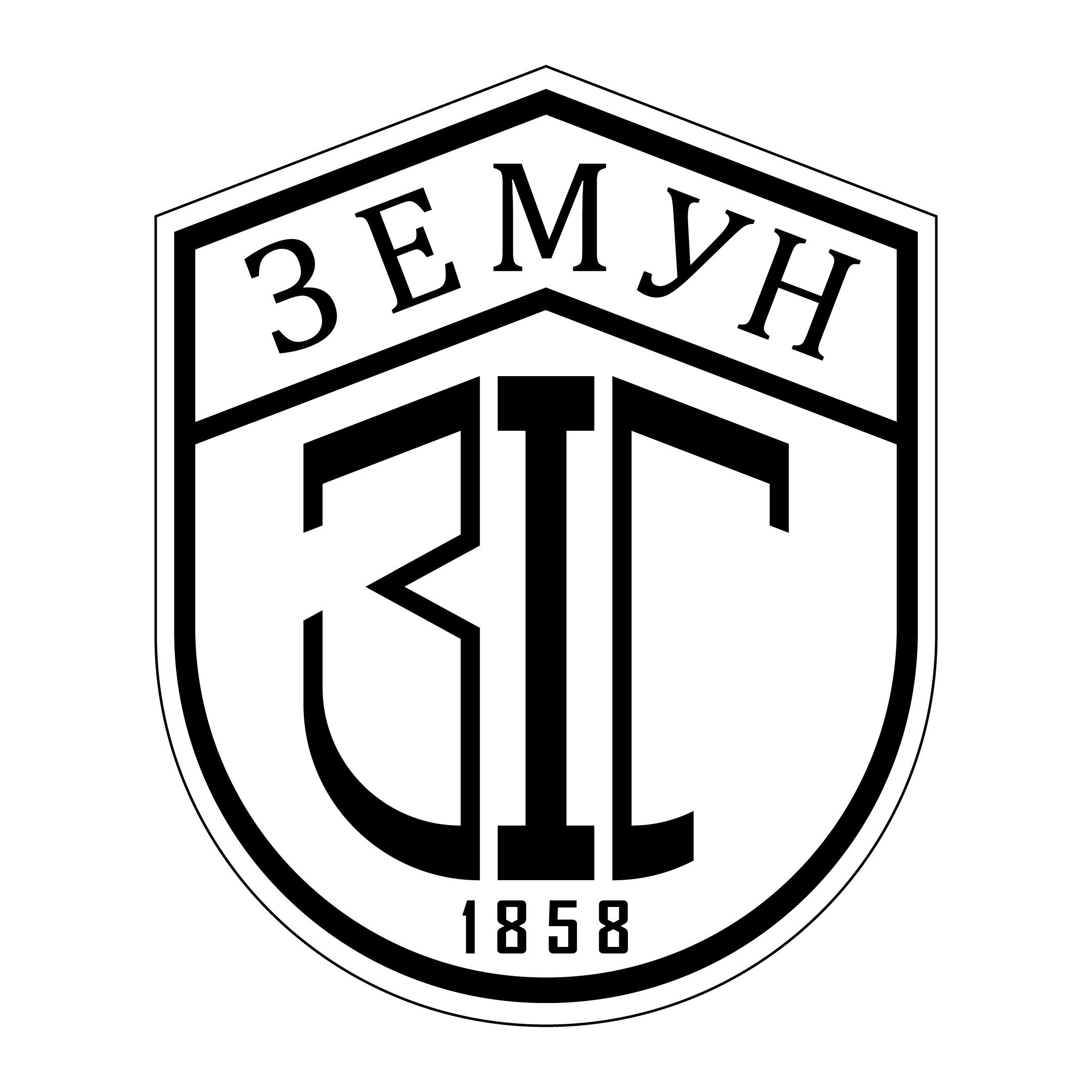

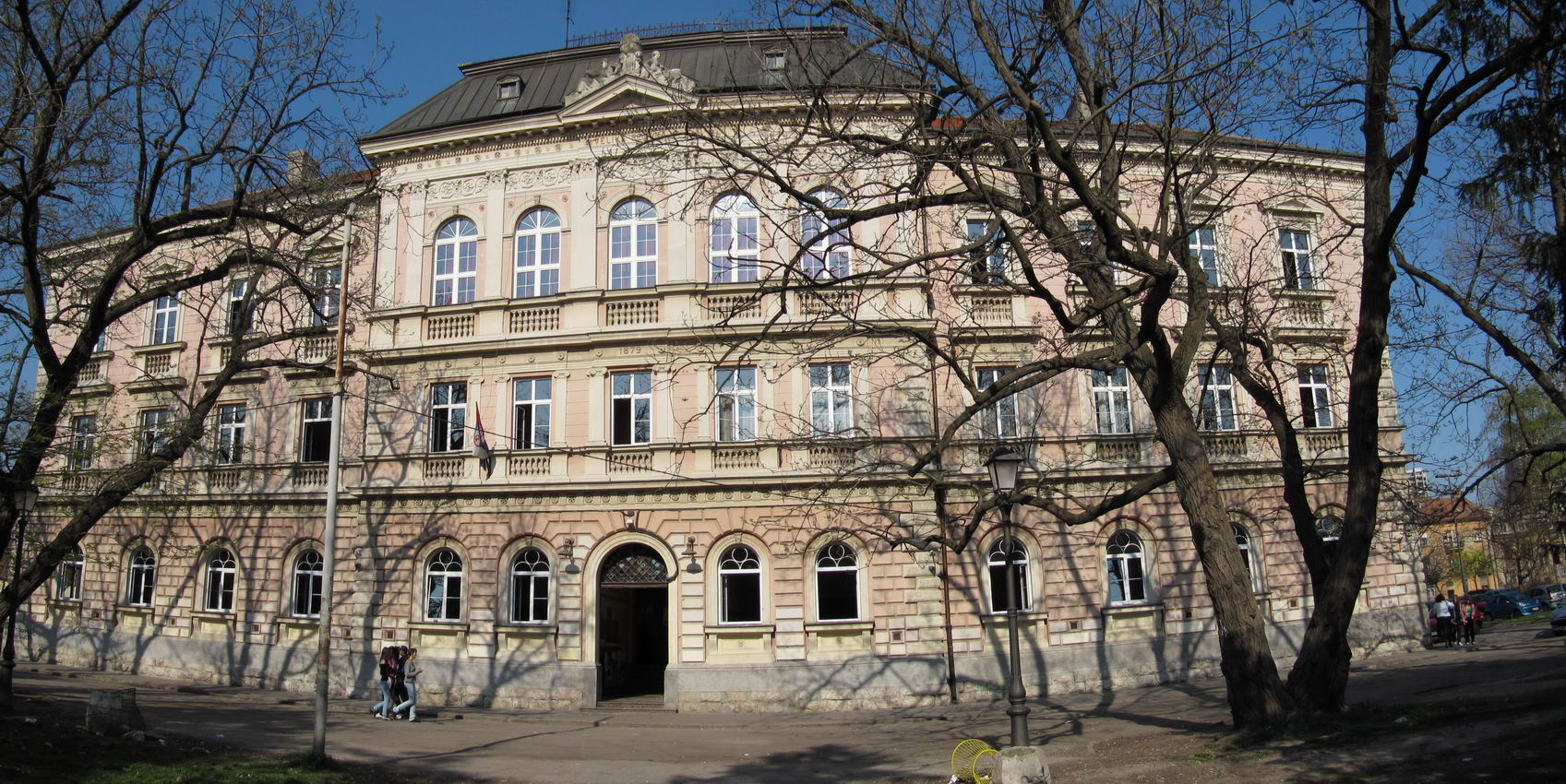

Location
- 1 Gradski park Syrmia; Zemun, City of Belgrade, 11080; Serbia; 44.841489°N 20.410956°E

Information
- School type: public, comprehensive high school
- Established: 23 September 1858
- Status: open
- Authority: Ministry of Education, Science and Technological Development
- Head of school: director Miloš Bjelanović (as of February 2018)
- Classes: 12 per year (48 in total)
- Language: Serbian
- Student Union/Association: Student parliament of Zemun Gymnasium
- Colors: blue and green
- Website: ZemunskaGimnazija.edu.rs

The Zemun Gymnasium (Serbian: Земунска гимназија, Zemunska gimnazija) is the most prominent gymnasium in Belgrade, Serbia. It is located in Belgrade’s Zemun municipality.

== History ==
The gymnasium was founded on 23 September 1858 on the orders of the Austrian military command in Zemun as a two-year lower realgymnasium. It initially had only one grade and just 21 students. Zemun was then a part of the Austrian Empire that was to become Austria-Hungary, and the language of instruction was German. By 1872 the gymnasium had four grades.

Founded in 1858, it's Belgrade second oldest, after the First Belgrade Gymnasium (founded in 1839), and Serbia's sixth oldest gymnasium, after those in Sremski Karlovci (founded in 1791), Novi Sad (founded in 1810), Kragujevac (founded in 1833) and Šabac (founded in 1837).

In 1883 it was decided that Serbian should be the language of instruction, and a year later, on the orders of the Government, girls were restricted to the first grade, so it was solely for boys by 1887.

Due to World War I events, the school experienced a multitude of problems, and did not start functioning normally again until 1925. Though part of the Serbian, and later Yugoslav, educational system since 1918, German language remained in use until 1925. That same year, the school was open for girls. First cinema in Zemun was open in the school building in 1926.

Today's gymnasium exists since 1958, after a merger with two smaller schools (for boys and for girls) created in 1946 after the liberation of Serbia & Yugoslavia from the Nazis by the Communist Partisans and the Red Army. For a while, a Commerce school was located in the building, while in the 1970s the gymnasium was organized as an "educational center".

In 2008, the Zemun Gymnasium celebrated its 150th anniversary.

In the 2017/18 school year 320 first graders were admitted in total of 11 classes. They are divided in three sections: sociolinguistic, natural sciences-mathematics and physics. Additional 12th grade, for informatics, is planned for 2018/19.

By the number of students, it is the largest gymnasium in Serbia as of 2018.

== The building ==
The gymnasium building is located in the City park, situated between University of Belgrade's Faculty of Agriculture building and a primary school.

The present building was built in 1879 in the Neo-Renaissance style by Nikola Kolar. By 1912 the initial building proved to have inadequate space for accommodating all the students so plans were set up to expand it. Expansion was finished in 1916. The added structure was intended to be in Neo-Renaissance style too, but was, instead, built in post-secessionist style. Hence, the building is actually formed by two buildings with a completely enclosed interior court.

The total floor area of the building is 10,000 m (33,000 ft), of which 5,500 m (18,000 ft) is used for everyday curricular activities. The interior of the building was renovated in 2009, and the building is now under the State's protection as a cultural monument.

== Present ==
As of February 2018, the gymnasium has 1,205 students in four grades. There are 95 teachers, of which 20% were students in the gymnasium themselves, and 22 additional workers.

The school's library has 35,000 books. It is the oldest student's library in Serbia. About 100 books originate from before 1850.

In 1993 a private foundation called "Fund of the former students and professors of the Zemun Gymnasium" was founded. Every year the foundation organizes intergenerational meetings while the best student is being awarded with a gold coin. The award will be named Gordana Vunjak-Novakovic after the world famous bio engineer and alumni of the school.

In 2014, the school organizes a project "Meeting of the European gymnasiums". It is a yearly meeting of the gymnasiums, and as of 2018 the schools from Serbia, Hungary, Romania, Slovenia and Bosnia and Herzegovina participate.

== Notable alumni ==
- David Albahari, writer
- Momčilo Bajagić, musician
- Đorđe David, musician
- Jelena Karleuša
- Mlađan Dinkić, politician
- Jovan Karamata, mathematician
- Predrag Koraksić Corax, caricaturist
- Aleksandar Lokner, musician
- Željko Mitrović, media mogul
- Goran Paskaljević, movie director
- Ivana Peters, musician
- Pavle Radosavljević, Nikola Tesla's secretary
- Dragan Rumenčić, caricaturist
- Aleksandar Vučić, politician
- Oliver Vujović, secretary general SEEMO
- Gordana Vunjak-Novakovic, bio engineer
- Sava Šumanović, painter

== See also ==
- Zemun
- Gymnasium (school)
- Ninth Belgrade Gymnasium "Mihailo Petrović-Alas"
