= Rudawa =

Rudawa may refer to the following places in Poland:

- Rudawa (river), a river in southern Poland
- Rudawa, Lesser Poland Voivodeship (south Poland)
- Rudawa, Kłodzko County in Lower Silesian Voivodeship (south-west Poland)
- Rudawa, Wołów County in Lower Silesian Voivodeship (south-west Poland)
- Rudawa, Świętokrzyskie Voivodeship (south-central Poland)
- Rudawa, Opole Voivodeship (south-west Poland)
