= Żerków (disambiguation) =

Żerków is a town in Greater Poland Voivodeship (west-central Poland).

Żerków may also refer to:

- Żerków, Lower Silesian Voivodeship (south-west Poland)
- Żerków, Lesser Poland Voivodeship (south Poland)

== See also ==
- Żerkówek
