= Bukowice, Wołów County =

Bukowice
- Village
- Location within Poland
- Coordinates: 51°18′23″N 16°46′37″E
- Country: Poland
- Voivodeship: Lower Silesian
- County: Wołów
- Gmina: Brzeg Dolny

Bukowice [bukɔˈvit͡sɛ] is a village in the administrative district of Gmina Brzeg Dolny, within Wołów County, Lower Silesian Voivodeship, in south-western Poland.
