= Węglewo, Wołów County =

Węglewo
- Village
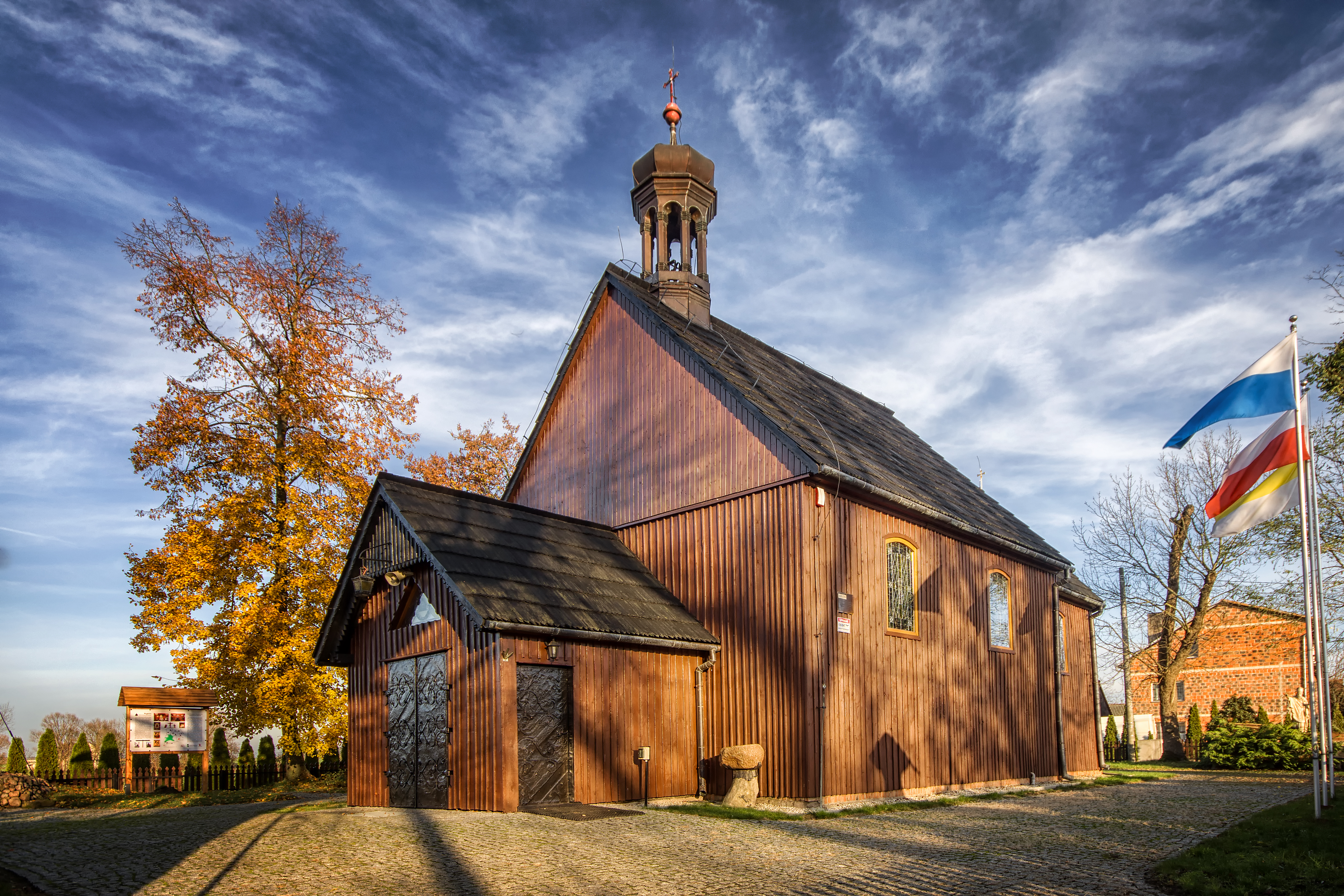
- Catholic church

- Location within Poland
- Coordinates: 51°28′39″N 16°41′38″E
- Country: Poland
- Voivodeship: Lower Silesian
- County: Wołów
- Gmina: Wińsko

Węglewo [vɛŋˈɡlɛvɔ] is a village in the administrative district of Gmina Wińsko, within Wołów County, Lower Silesian Voivodeship, in south-western Poland.
