= Jodłowice =

- Village
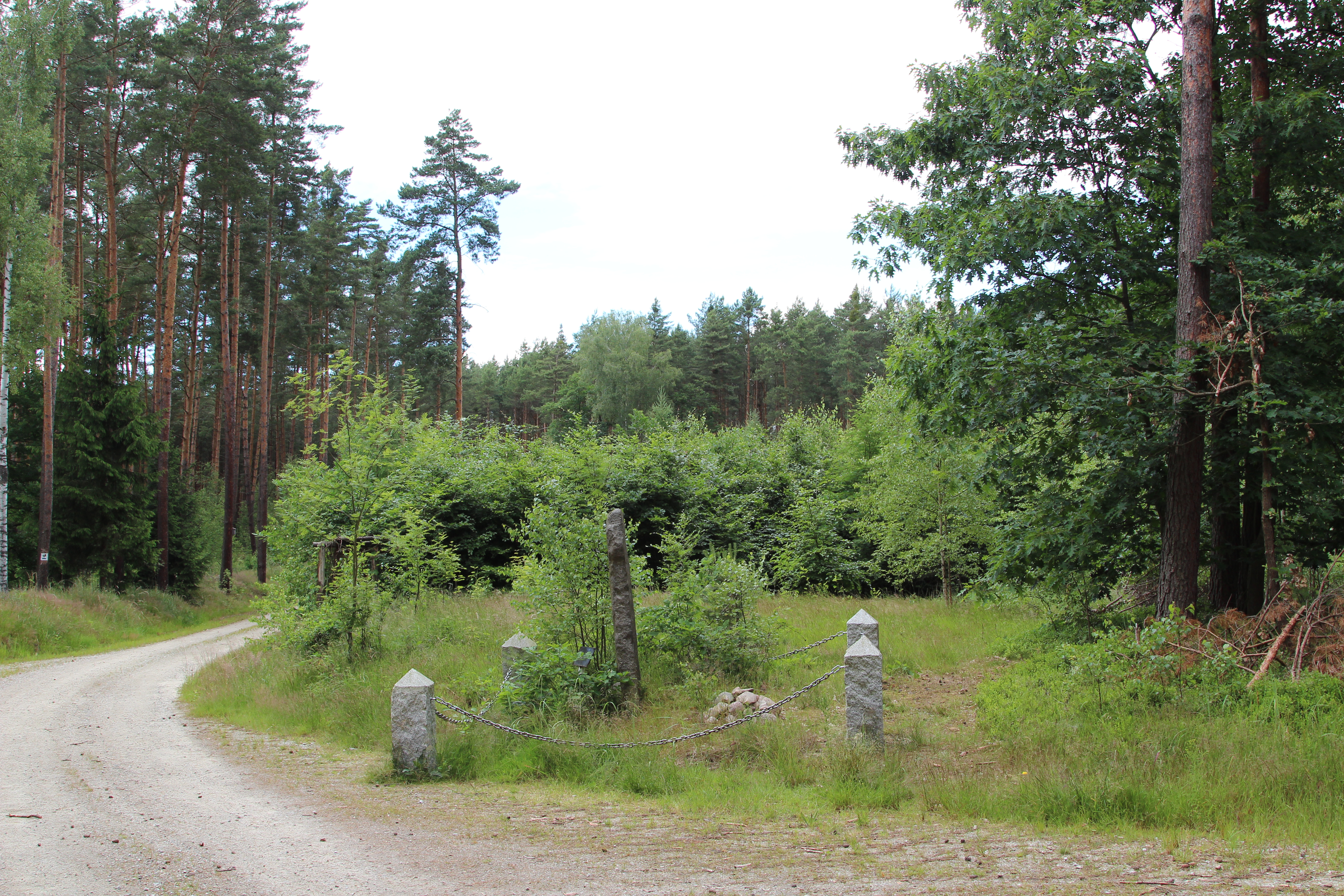
- Jodlowice stone cross

- Location within Poland
- Coordinates: 51°16′53″N 16°47′37″E
- Country: Poland
- Voivodeship: Lower Silesian
- County: Wołów
- Gmina: Brzeg Dolny

Jodłowice [jɔdwɔˈvit͡sɛ] (German: Tannwald) is a village in the administrative district of Gmina Brzeg Dolny, within Wołów County, Lower Silesian Voivodeship, in south-western Poland.
