= Jakubikowice =

- Village
- Location within Poland
- Coordinates: 51°27′13″N 16°36′05″E
- Country: Poland
- Voivodeship: Lower Silesian
- County: Wołów
- Gmina: Wińsko

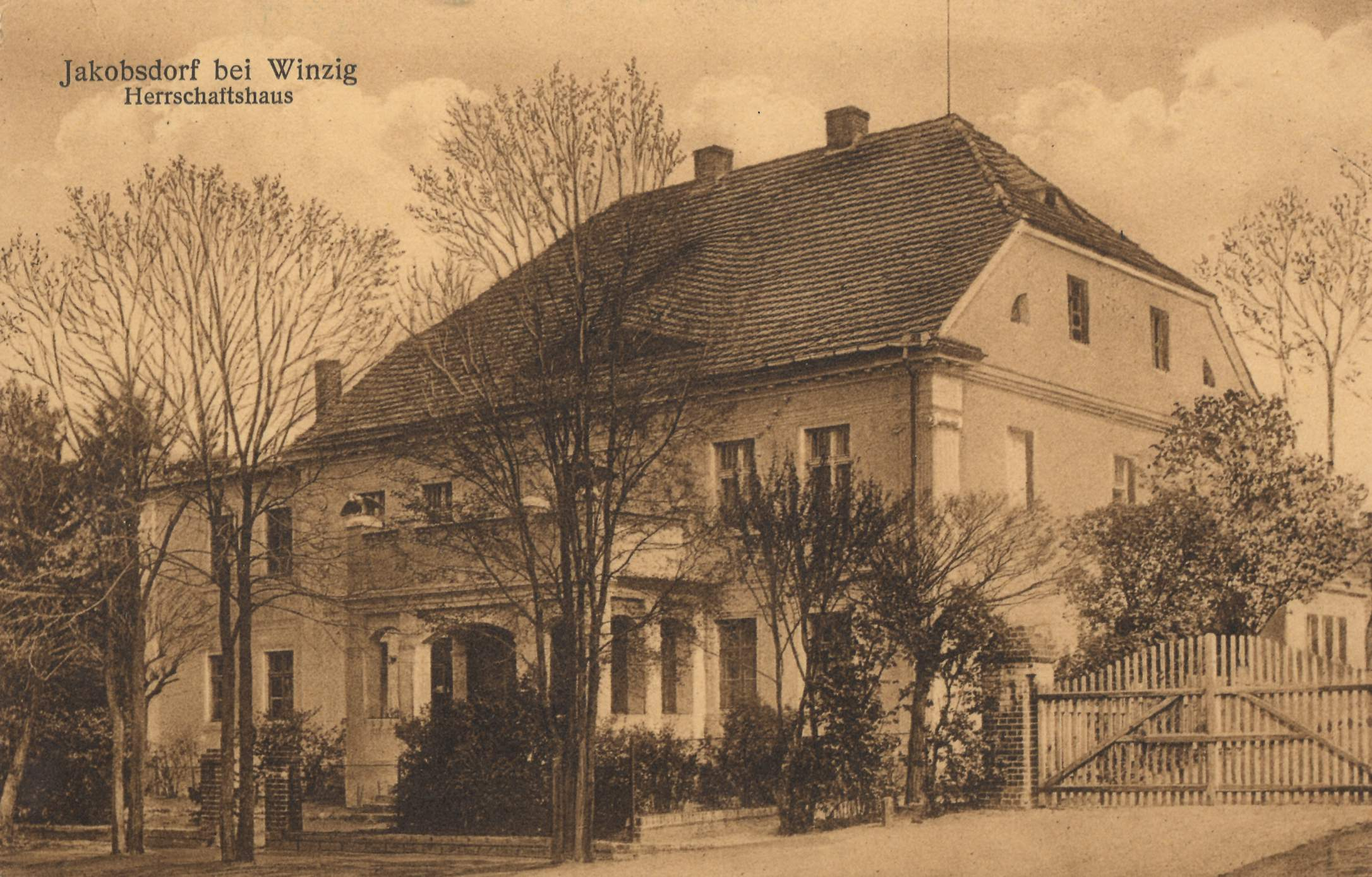
Jakubikowice (1900 postcard)

Jakubikowice [jakubikɔˈvit͡sɛ] is a village in the administrative district of Gmina Wińsko, within Wołów County, Lower Silesian Voivodeship, in south-western Poland.
