= Orzeszków, Lower Silesian Voivodeship =

Orzeszków
- Village
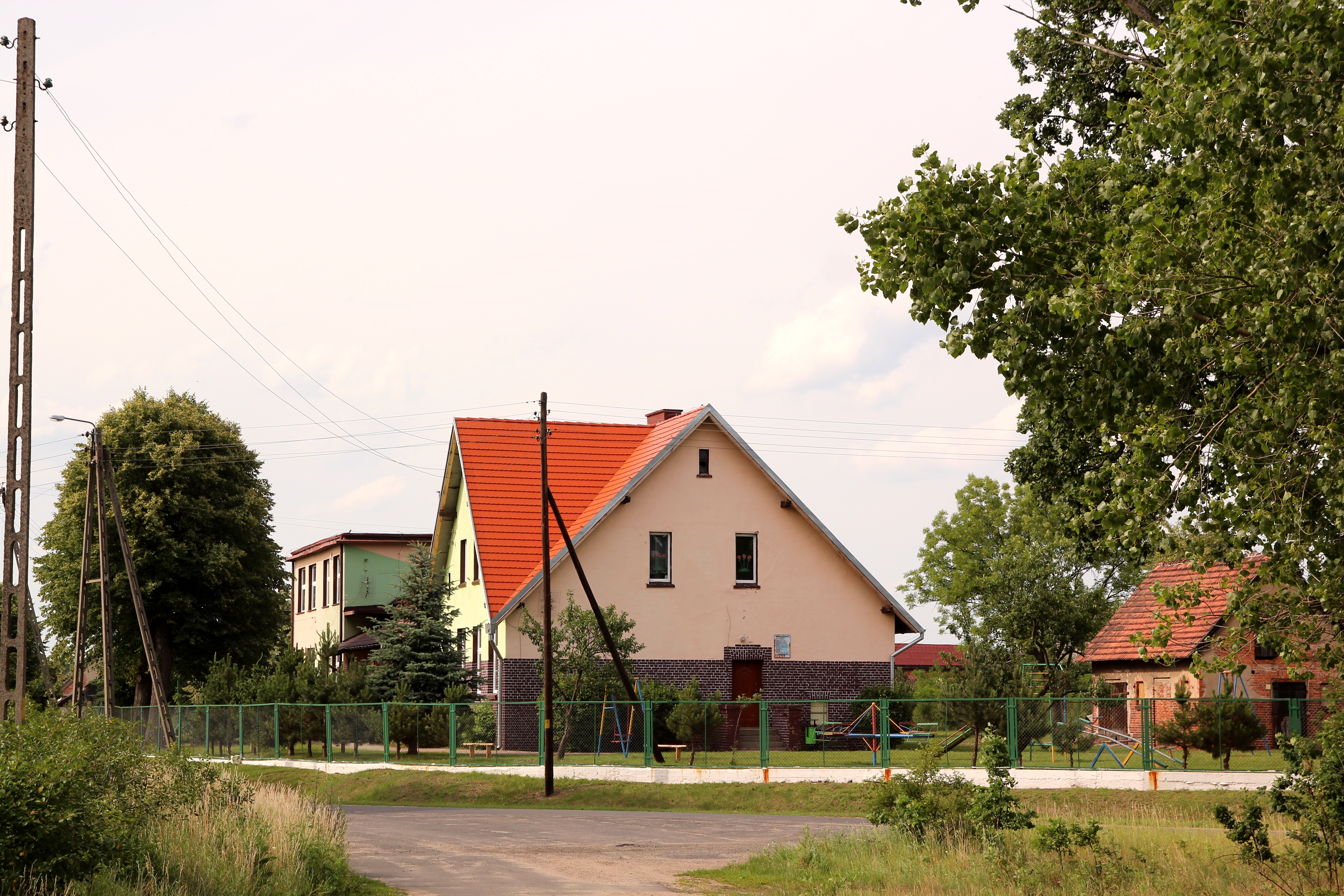

- Location within Poland
- Coordinates: 51°24′N 16°30′E
- Country: Poland
- Voivodeship: Lower Silesian
- County: Wołów
- Gmina: Wińsko

Orzeszków [ɔˈʐɛʂkuf] is a village in the administrative district of Gmina Wińsko, within Wołów County, Lower Silesian Voivodeship, in south-western Poland.
