= Budków =

Budków may refer to the following places in Poland:

- Budków, Lower Silesian Voivodeship (south-west Poland)
- Budków, Opoczno County in Łódź Voivodeship (central Poland)
- Budków, Piotrków County in Łódź Voivodeship (central Poland)
