= Krzelów, Lower Silesian Voivodeship =

Krzelów
- Village
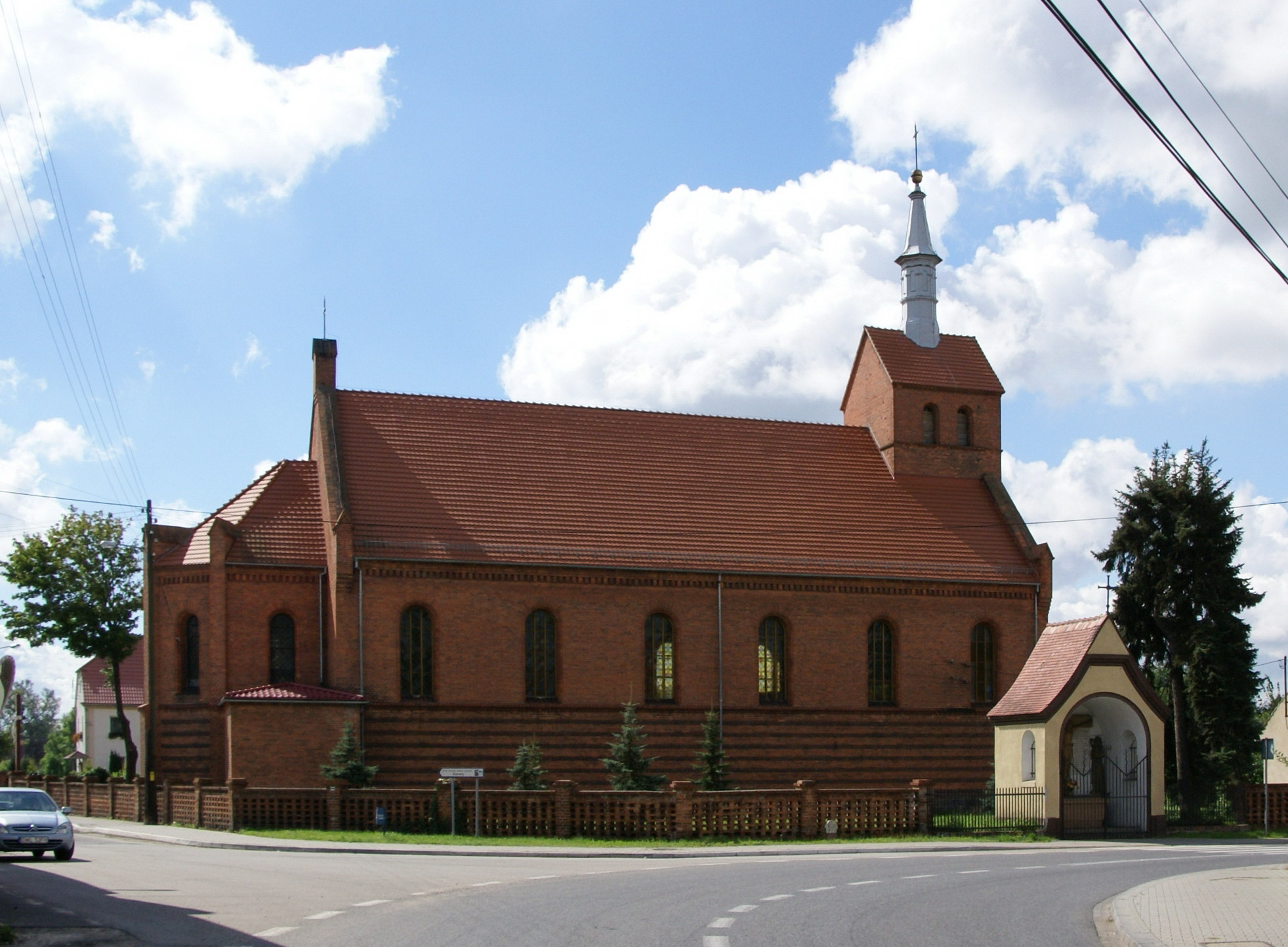
- Saint Martin Church

- Location within Poland
- Coordinates: 51°26′17″N 16°30′41″E
- Country: Poland
- Voivodeship: Lower Silesian
- County: Wołów
- Gmina: Wińsko

Krzelów [ˈkʂɛluf] is a village in the administrative district of Gmina Wińsko, within Wołów County, Lower Silesian Voivodeship, in south-western Poland.
