= Wały =

Wały may refer to the following places in Poland:

- Wały, Lower Silesian Voivodeship (south-west Poland)
- Wały, Nidzica County in Warmian-Masurian Voivodeship (north Poland)
- Wały, Szczytno County in Warmian-Masurian Voivodeship (north Poland)
