= Białków, Wołów County =

Białków
- Village
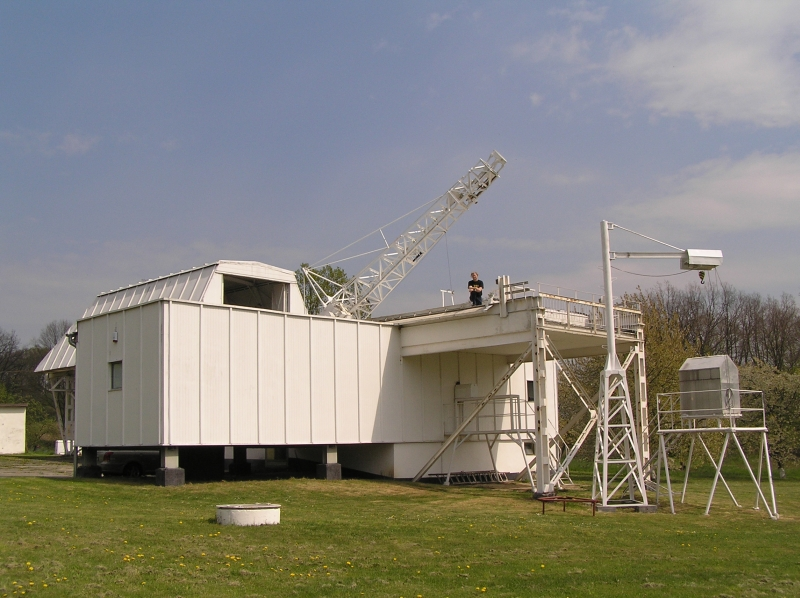

- Location within Poland
- Coordinates: 51°28′34″N 16°39′24″E
- Country: Poland
- Voivodeship: Lower Silesian
- County: Wołów
- Gmina: Wińsko

Białków [ˈbjau̯kuf] is a village in the administrative district of Gmina Wińsko, within Wołów County, Lower Silesian Voivodeship, in south-western Poland.
