= Domanice, Wołów County =

Domanice
- Village
- Location within Poland
- Coordinates: 51°25′16″N 16°37′43″E
- Country: Poland
- Voivodeship: Lower Silesian
- County: Wołów
- Gmina: Wińsko

Domanice [dɔmaˈnit͡sɛ] is a village in the administrative district of Gmina Wińsko, within Wołów County, Lower Silesian Voivodeship, in south-western Poland.
