= Węgrzce =

Węgrzce may refer to the following places in Poland:

- Węgrzce, Lower Silesian Voivodeship (south-west Poland)
- Węgrzce, Lesser Poland Voivodeship (south Poland)
