= Piskorzyna =

- Village
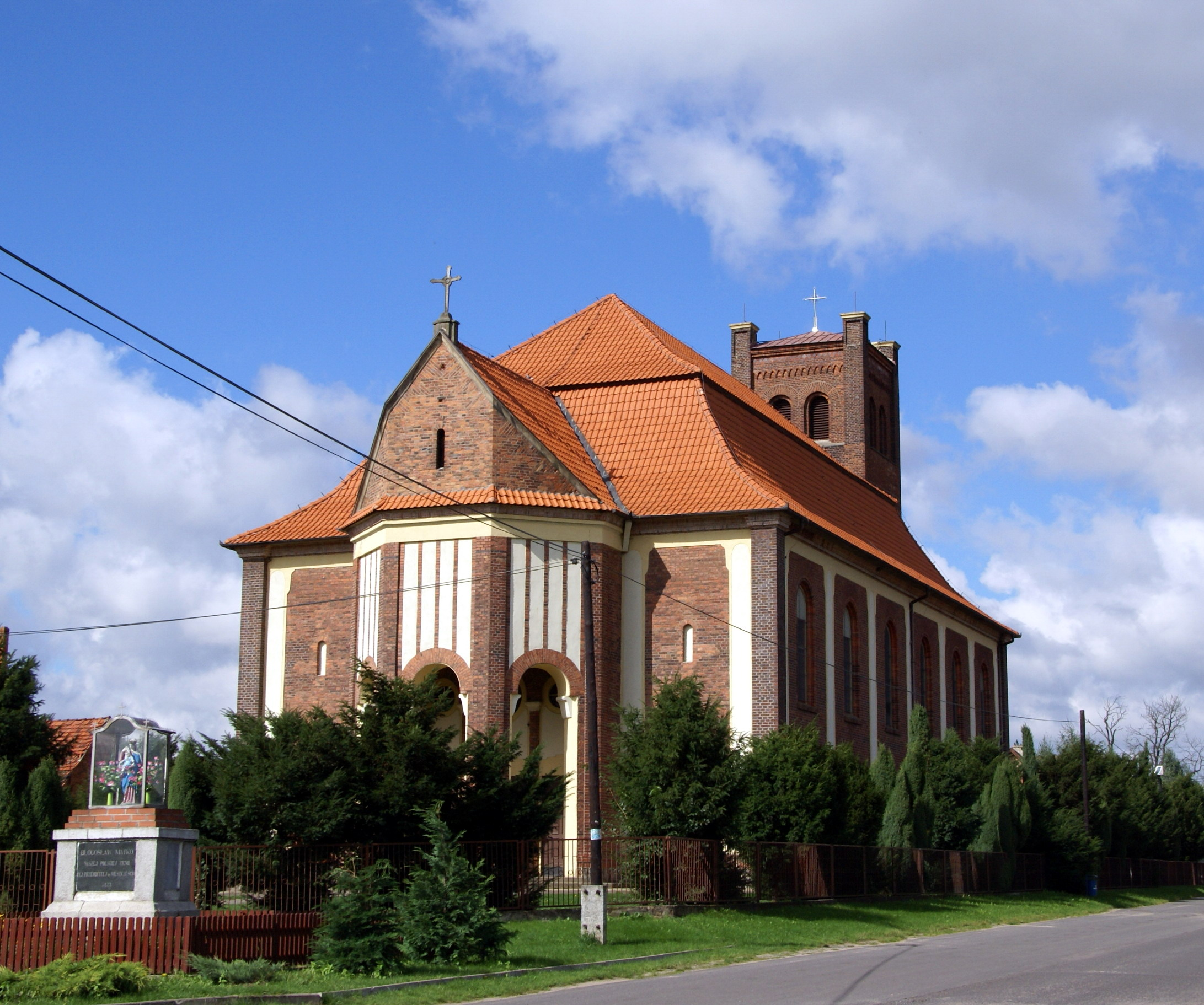
- Church of the Immaculate Heart of Mary in Piskorzyna

- Location within Poland
- Coordinates: 51°30′N 16°38′E
- Country: Poland
- Voivodeship: Lower Silesian
- County: Wołów
- Gmina: Wińsko
- Time zone: UTC+1 (CET)
  - Summer (DST): UTC+2 (CEST)
- Vehicle registration: DWL

Piskorzyna [piskɔˈʐɨna] is a village in the administrative district of Gmina Wińsko, within Wołów County, Lower Silesian Voivodeship, in south-western Poland.

The name of the village is of Polish origin and comes from the word piskorz, which means "weatherfish".
