= Grodzanów =

- Village
- Location within Poland
- Coordinates: 51°15′09″N 16°35′43″E
- Country: Poland
- Voivodeship: Lower Silesian
- County: Wołów
- Gmina: Brzeg Dolny

Grodzanów [ɡrɔˈd͡zanuf] is a village in the administrative district of Gmina Brzeg Dolny, within Wołów County, Lower Silesian Voivodeship, in south-western Poland.
