= Moczydlnica Klasztorna =

- Village
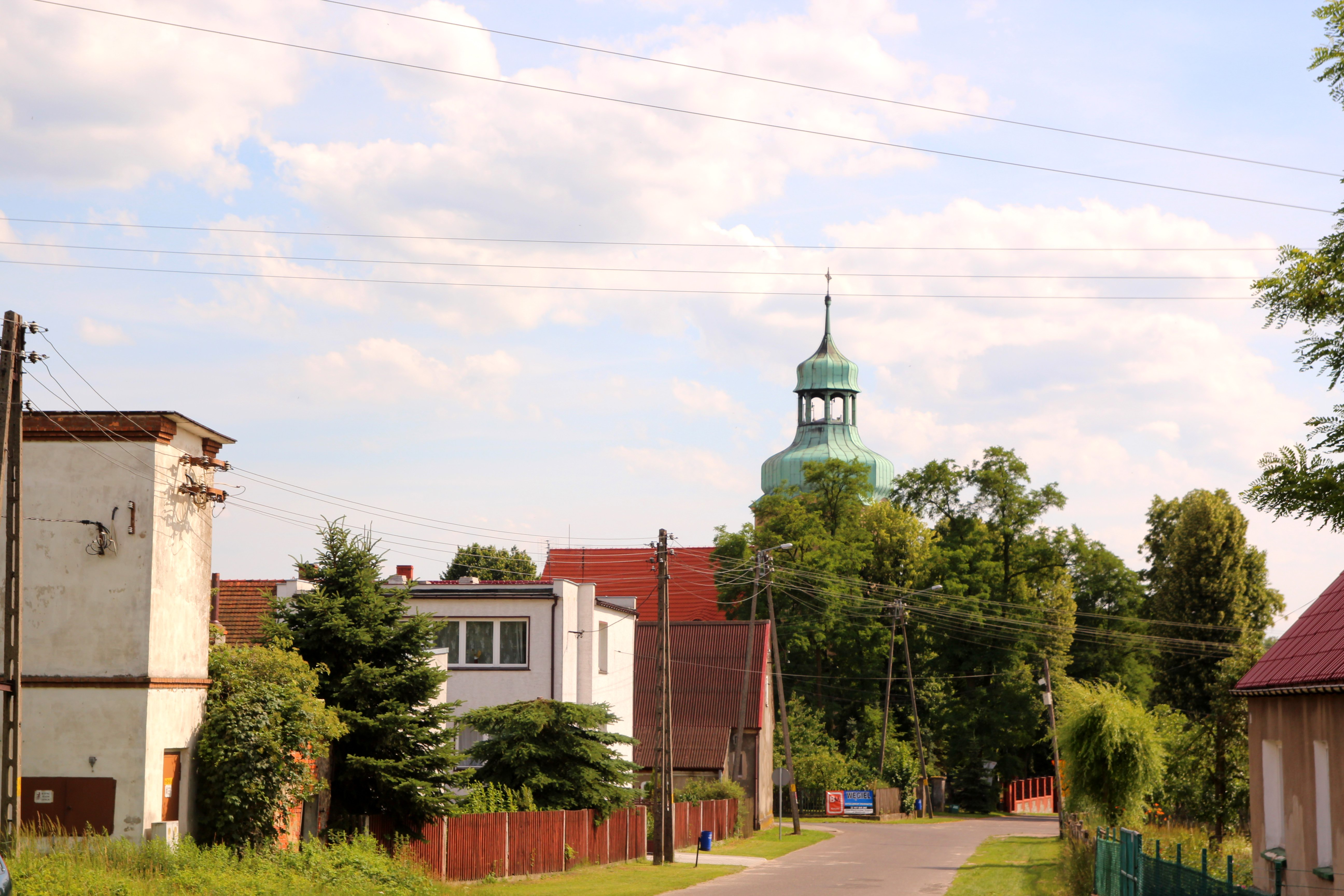
- Re-exposure of Moczydlnica klasztorna

- Location within Poland
- Coordinates: 51°24′N 16°35′E
- Country: Poland
- Voivodeship: Lower Silesian
- County: Wołów
- Gmina: Wińsko

Moczydlnica Klasztorna [mɔt͡ʂɨdlˈnit͡sa klaʂˈtɔrna] (de:Mönchmotschelnitz) is a village in the administrative district of Gmina Wińsko, within Wołów County, Lower Silesian Voivodeship, in south-western Poland.

== Sons and daughters ==
- Hellmut von Gerlach (1866-1935), journalist and politician, member of Reichstag
