= Godzięcin =

- Village
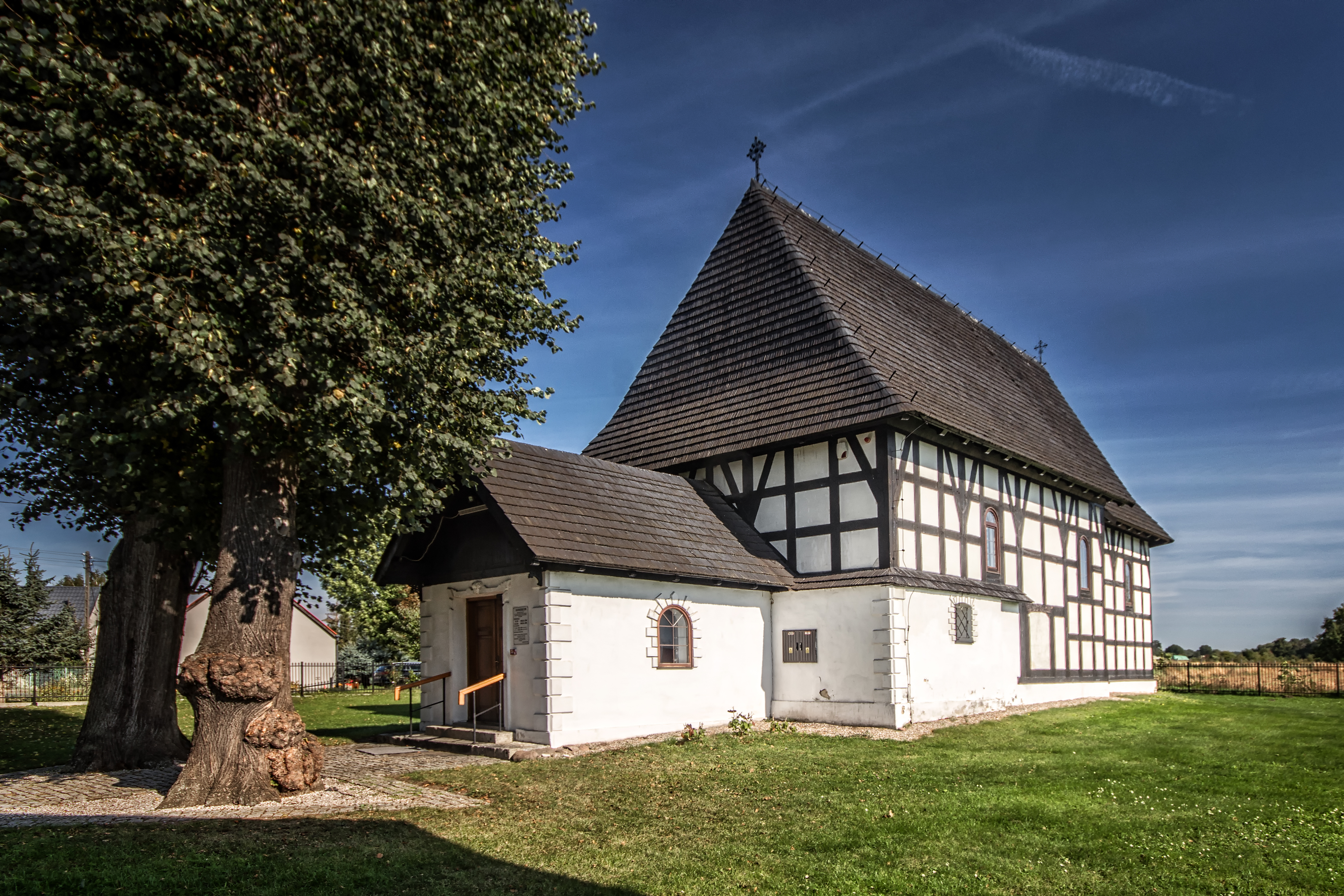
- Church of the Sacred Heart of Jesus

- Location within Poland
- Coordinates: 51°19′43″N 16°46′13″E
- Country: Poland
- Voivodeship: Lower Silesian
- County: Wołów
- Gmina: Brzeg Dolny
- Time zone: UTC+1 (CET)
  - Summer (DST): UTC+2 (CEST)
- Vehicle registration: DWL

Godzięcin [ɡɔˈd͡ʑɛnt͡ɕin] (German: Thiergarten) is a village in the administrative district of Gmina Brzeg Dolny, within Wołów County, Lower Silesian Voivodeship, in south-western Poland.
