= Pogalewo Małe =

- Village
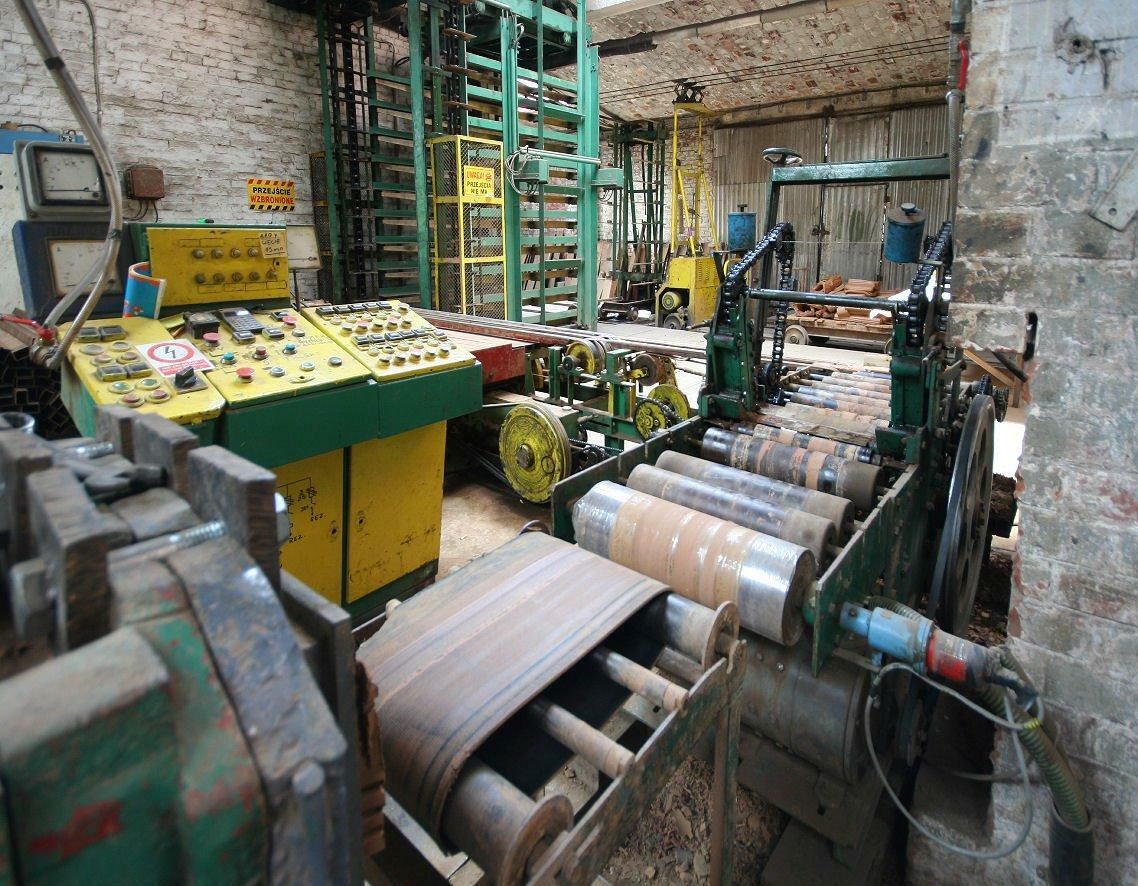
- Brickyard

- Location within Poland
- Coordinates: 51°15′15″N 16°39′33″E
- Country: Poland
- Voivodeship: Lower Silesian
- County: Wołów
- Gmina: Brzeg Dolny
- Population: 250

Pogalewo Małe [pɔɡaˈlɛvɔ ˈmawɛ] is a village in the administrative district of Gmina Brzeg Dolny, within Wołów County, Lower Silesian Voivodeship, in south-western Poland.
