= Wrzeszów =

- Village
- Location within Poland
- Coordinates: 51°29′42″N 16°34′13″E
- Country: Poland
- Voivodeship: Lower Silesian
- County: Wołów
- Gmina: Wińsko

Wrzeszów [ˈvʐɛʂuf] is a village in the administrative district of Gmina Wińsko, within Wołów County, Lower Silesian Voivodeship, in south-western Poland.
