= Stary Dwór, Wołów County =

Stary Dwór
- Village
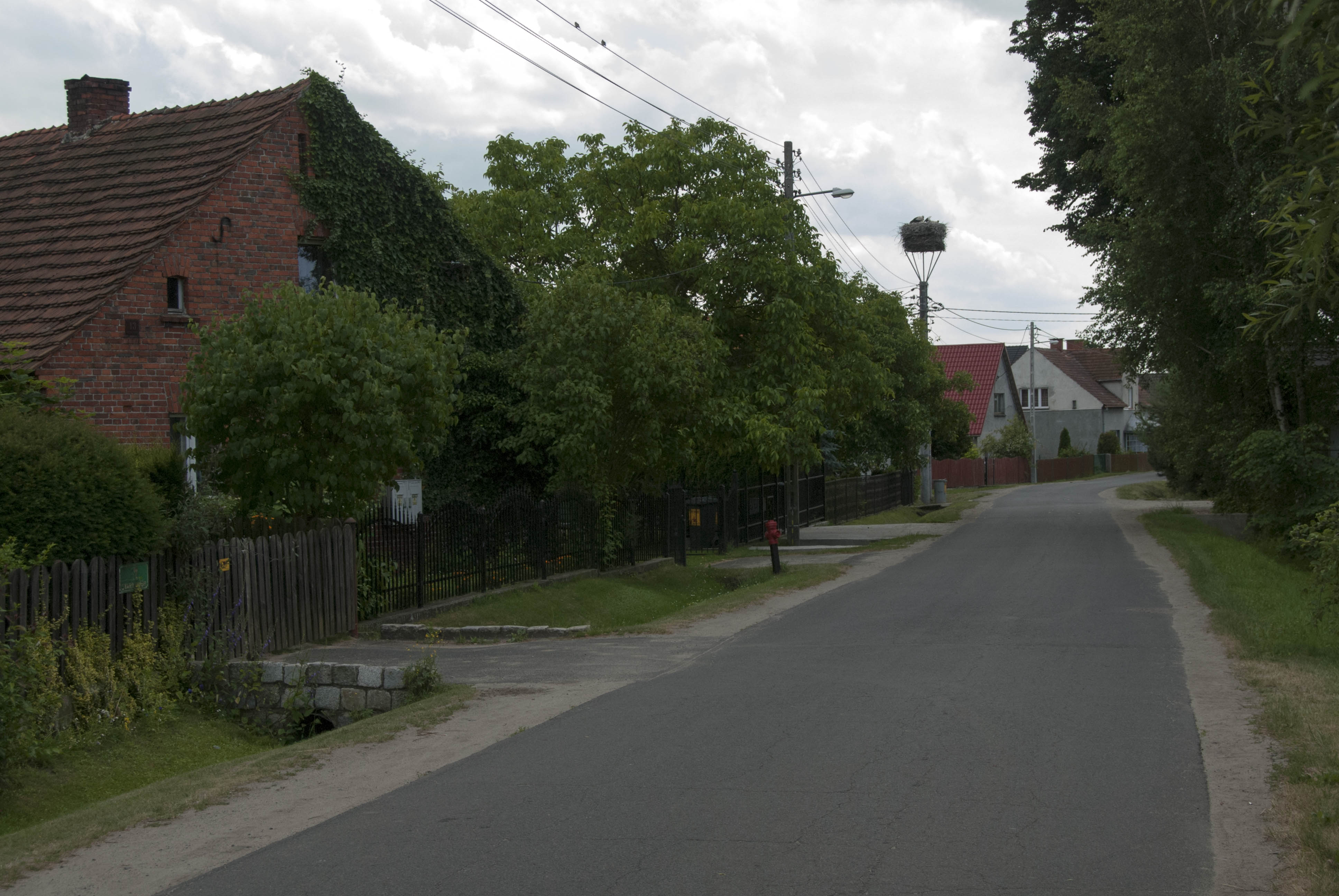

- Location within Poland
- Coordinates: 51°16′N 16°47′E
- Country: Poland
- Voivodeship: Lower Silesian
- County: Wołów
- Gmina: Brzeg Dolny

Stary Dwór [ˈstarɨ ˈdvur] is a village in the administrative district of Gmina Brzeg Dolny, within Wołów County, Lower Silesian Voivodeship, in south-western Poland.
