= Boraszyce Wielkie =

- Village
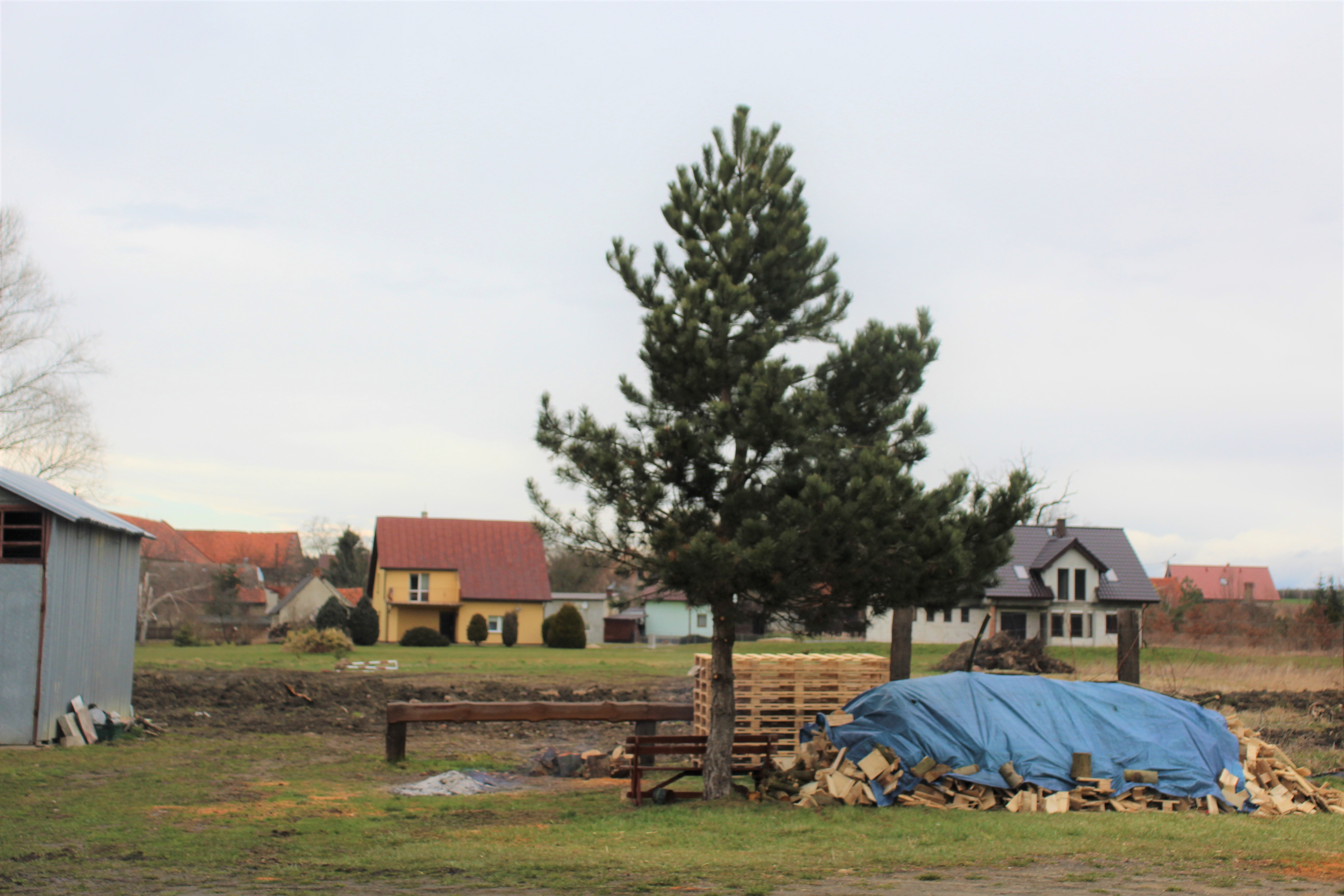

- Location within Poland
- Coordinates: 51°27′33″N 16°32′47″E
- Country: Poland
- Voivodeship: Lower Silesian
- County: Wołów
- Gmina: Wińsko

Boraszyce Wielkie [bɔraˈʂɨt͡sɛ ˈvjɛlkʲɛ] is a village in the administrative district of Gmina Wińsko, within Wołów County, Lower Silesian Voivodeship, in south-western Poland.
