= Konary, Wołów County =

Konary
- Village
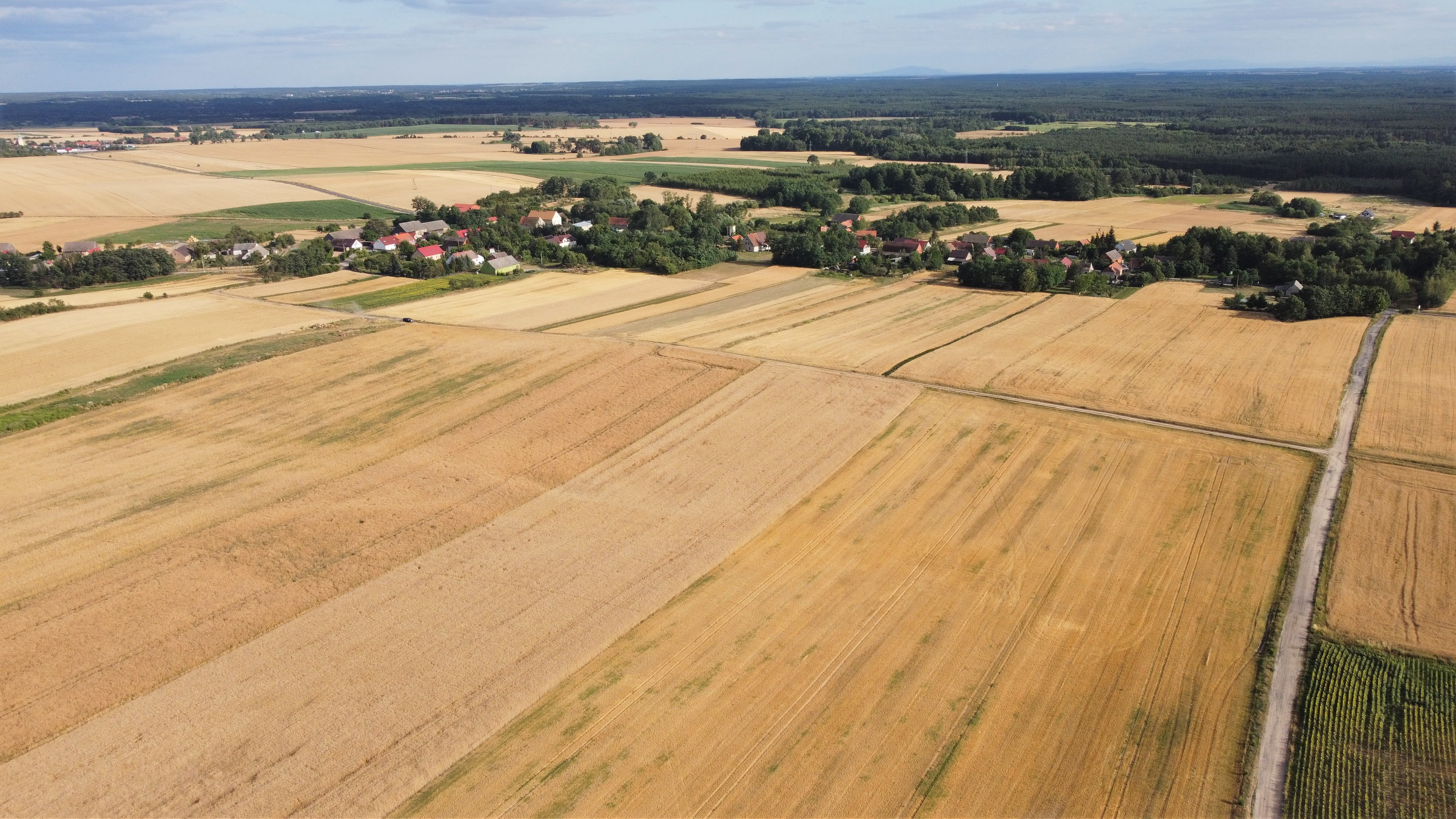

- Location within Poland
- Coordinates: 51°24′44″N 16°33′28″E
- Country: Poland
- Voivodeship: Lower Silesian
- County: Wołów
- Gmina: Wińsko
- First mentioned: 1202
- Time zone: UTC+1 (CET)
  - Summer (DST): UTC+2 (CEST)
- Vehicle registration: DWL

Konary [kɔˈnarɨ] is a village in the administrative district of Gmina Wińsko, within Wołów County, Lower Silesian Voivodeship, in south-western Poland.

== History ==
The village was first mentioned as Uconar in a document of Cyprian, bishop of Wrocław from 1202, when it was part of fragmented Piast-ruled Poland. The name of the village is of Polish origin and comes either from the word konar which means "branch" or from the word koń which means "horse".

Under Prussian rule, the world's first factory for extracting sugar from sugar beets was opened in 1802 in Konary (then known as Kunern).
