= Majunke =

Majunke is a surname. Notable people with the surname include:

- Jana Majunke (born 1990), German Paralympic cyclist
- Paul Majunke (1842–1899), Catholic priest, journalist, and Reichstag deputy
