= Baszyn =

- Village
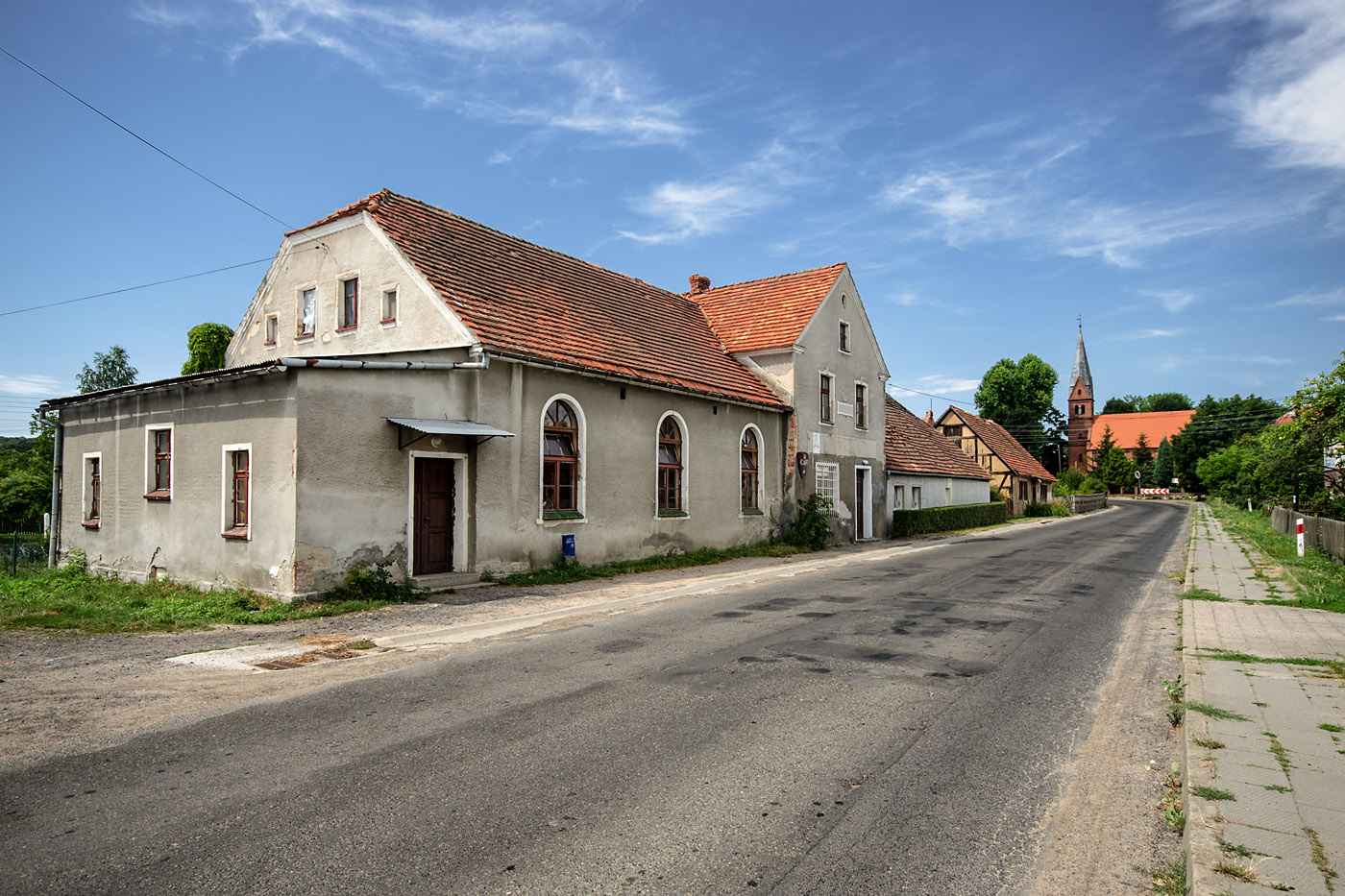
- Baszyn

- Location within Poland
- Coordinates: 51°26′16″N 16°37′03″E
- Country: Poland
- Voivodeship: Lower Silesian
- County: Wołów
- Gmina: Wińsko
- Population: 150

Baszyn [ˈbaʂɨn] is a village in the administrative district of Gmina Wińsko, within Wołów County, Lower Silesian Voivodeship, in south-western Poland.
