= Buszkowice Małe =

- Village
- Location within Poland
- Coordinates: 51°27′36″N 16°28′18″E
- Country: Poland
- Voivodeship: Lower Silesian
- County: Wołów
- Gmina: Wińsko

Buszkowice Małe [buʂkɔˈvit͡sɛ ˈmawɛ] is a village in the administrative district of Gmina Wińsko, within Wołów County, Lower Silesian Voivodeship, in south-western Poland.
