= Staszowice =

- Village
- Location within Poland
- Coordinates: 51°26′02″N 16°46′19″E
- Country: Poland
- Voivodeship: Lower Silesian
- County: Wołów
- Gmina: Wińsko
- Population: 54

Staszowice [staʂɔˈvit͡sɛ] is a village in the administrative district of Gmina Wińsko, within Wołów County, Lower Silesian Voivodeship, in south-western Poland.
