= Dąbie, Wołów County =

Dąbie
- Village
- Location within Poland
- Coordinates: 51°28′56″N 16°29′24″E
- Country: Poland
- Voivodeship: Lower Silesian
- County: Wołów
- Gmina: Wińsko

Dąbie [ˈdɔmbjɛ] is a village in the administrative district of Gmina Wińsko, within Wołów County, Lower Silesian Voivodeship, in south-western Poland.
