= Iwno, Lower Silesian Voivodeship =

Iwno
- Village
- Location within Poland
- Coordinates: 51°25′16″N 16°27′53″E
- Country: Poland
- Voivodeship: Lower Silesian
- County: Wołów
- Gmina: Wińsko

Iwno [ˈivnɔ] is a village in the administrative district of Gmina Wińsko, within Wołów County, Lower Silesian Voivodeship, in south-western Poland.
