= Radecz =

- Village
- Location within Poland
- Coordinates: 51°18′N 16°47′E
- Country: Poland
- Voivodeship: Lower Silesian
- County: Wołów
- Gmina: Brzeg Dolny

Radecz [ˈradɛt͡ʂ] is a village in the administrative district of Gmina Brzeg Dolny, within Wołów County, Lower Silesian Voivodeship, in south-western Poland.
