= Smogorzów Wielki =

- Village
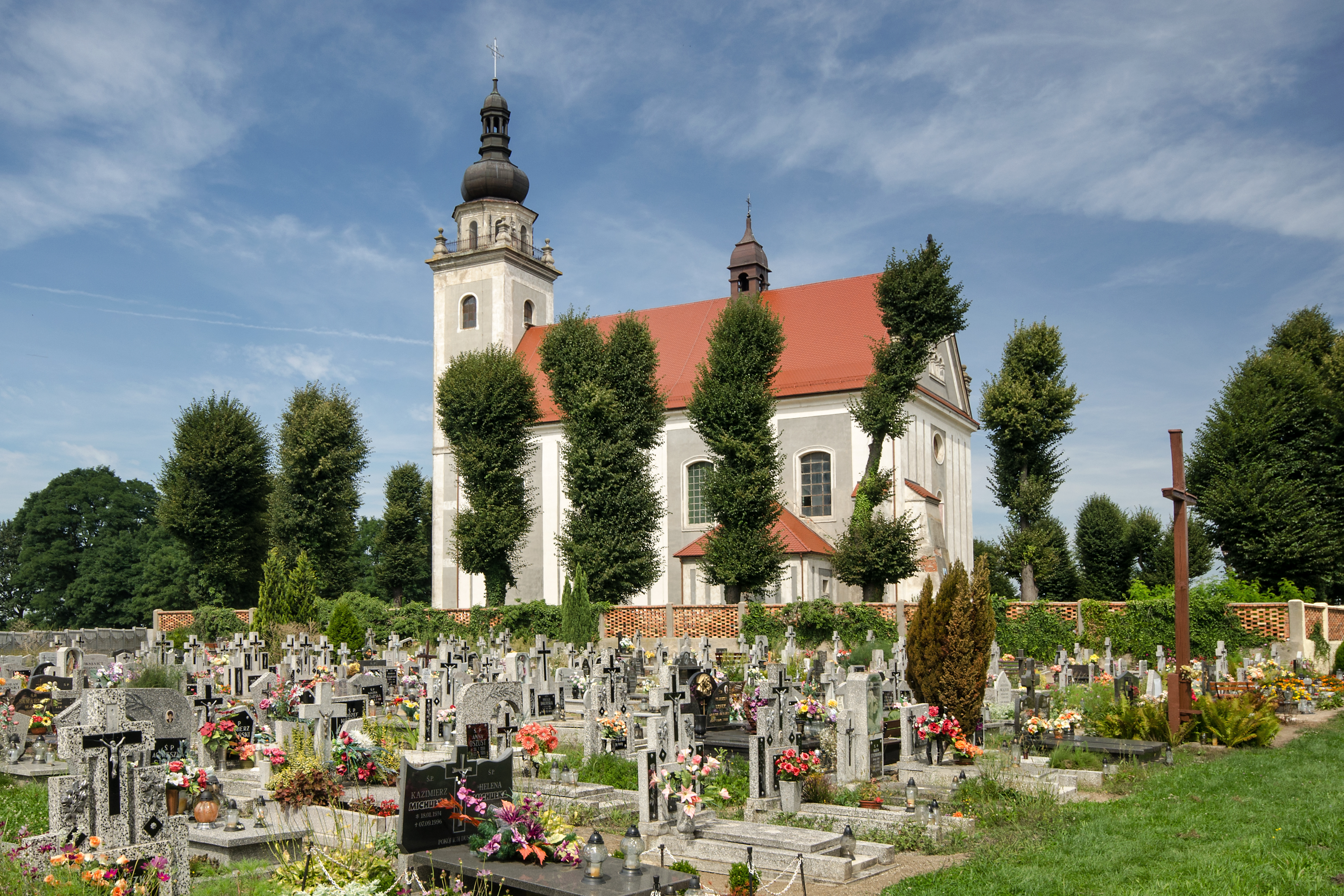
- Roman Catholic parish church of St. Michael the Archangel in Smogorzów Wielki

- Location within Poland
- Coordinates: 51°26′02″N 16°39′45″E
- Country: Poland
- Voivodeship: Lower Silesian
- County: Wołów
- Gmina: Wińsko

Smogorzów Wielki (Polish pronunciation: [smɔˈɡɔʐuv ˈvjɛlkʲi]) is a village in the administrative district of Gmina Wińsko, within Wołów County, Lower Silesian Voivodeship, in south-western Poland.

== People ==
- Paul Majunke (1842-1899), German journalist, Roman-Catholic priest and politician, member of Reichstag
