= Chwałkowice, Lower Silesian Voivodeship =

Chwałkowice
- Village
- Location within Poland
- Coordinates: 51°26′57″N 16°36′55″E
- Country: Poland
- Voivodeship: Lower Silesian
- County: Wołów
- Gmina: Wińsko
- Population: 80

Chwałkowice [xfau̯kɔˈvit͡sɛ] is a village in the administrative district of Gmina Wińsko, within Wołów County, Lower Silesian Voivodeship, in south-western Poland.
