= Aleksandrowice =

Aleksandrowice may refer to the following places in Poland:

- Aleksandrowice, Lower Silesian Voivodeship (south-west Poland)
- Aleksandrowice, Lesser Poland Voivodeship (south Poland)
- Aleksandrowice, Bielsko-Biała (south Poland)
