= Gryżyce =

Gryżyce may refer to the following places in Poland:

- Gryżyce, Lower Silesian Voivodeship (south-west Poland)
- Gryżyce, Lubusz Voivodeship (west Poland)
