= Łazy, Lower Silesian Voivodeship =

Łazy
- Village
- Location within Poland
- Coordinates: 51°30′03″N 16°33′24″E
- Country: Poland
- Voivodeship: Lower Silesian
- County: Wołów
- Gmina: Wińsko

Łazy [ˈwazɨ] is a village in the administrative district of Gmina Wińsko, within Wołów County, Lower Silesian Voivodeship, in south-western Poland.
