= Przyborów, Lower Silesian Voivodeship =

Przyborów
- Village
- Location within Poland
- Coordinates: 51°26′11″N 16°27′34″E
- Country: Poland
- Voivodeship: Lower Silesian
- County: Wołów
- Gmina: Wińsko

Przyborów [pʂɨˈbɔruf] is a village in the administrative district of Gmina Wińsko, within Wołów County, Lower Silesian Voivodeship, in south-western Poland.
