= Turzany, Lower Silesian Voivodeship =

Turzany
- Village
- Location within Poland
- Coordinates: 51°27′N 16°46′E
- Country: Poland
- Voivodeship: Lower Silesian
- County: Wołów
- Gmina: Wińsko

Turzany [tuˈʐanɨ] is a village in the administrative district of Gmina Wińsko, within Wołów County, Lower Silesian Voivodeship, in south-western Poland.
