= Pysząca =

Pysząca may refer to the following places in Poland:

- Pysząca, Lower Silesian Voivodeship (south-west Poland)
- Pysząca, Greater Poland Voivodeship (west-central Poland)
