= Małowice =

Małowice may refer to the following places in Poland:

- Małowice, Lower Silesian Voivodeship (south-west Poland)
- Małowice, Lubusz Voivodeship (west Poland)
