= Pogalewo Wielkie =

- Village
- Location within Poland
- Coordinates: 51°15′10″N 16°38′12″E
- Country: Poland
- Voivodeship: Lower Silesian
- County: Wołów
- Gmina: Brzeg Dolny

Pogalewo Wielkie [pɔɡaˈlɛvɔ ˈvjɛlkʲɛ] is a village in the administrative district of Gmina Brzeg Dolny, within Wołów County, Lower Silesian Voivodeship, in south-western Poland.
