= Brzózka =

Brzózka may refer to the following places in Poland:

- Brzózka, Lower Silesian Voivodeship (south-west Poland)
- Brzózka, Masovian Voivodeship (east-central Poland)
- Brzózka, Lubusz Voivodeship (west Poland)

== Persons ==
- Stefan Brzózka (born 1931) - Polish chess master.
