= Naborów =

- Village
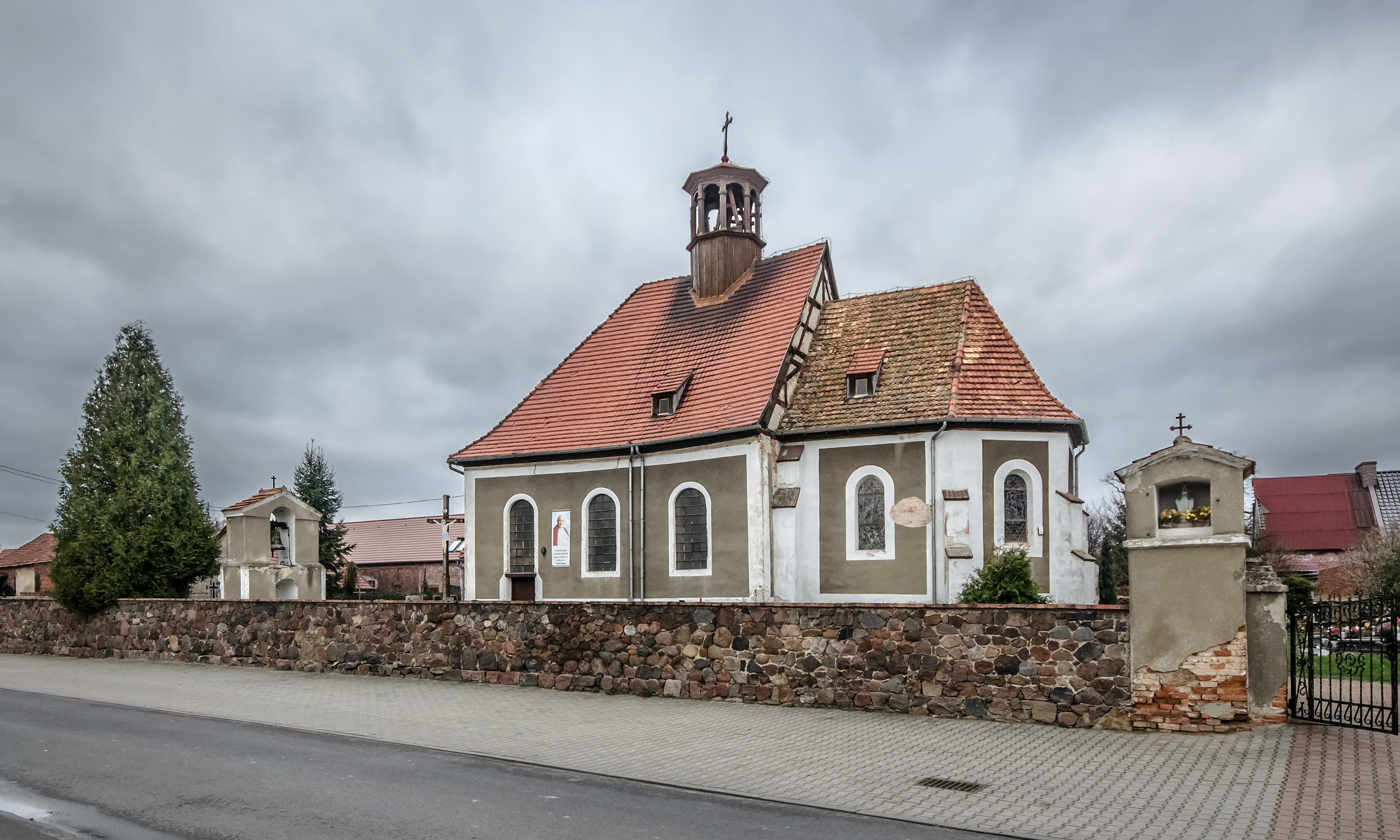
- Saint Anne Church in Naborów

- Location within Poland
- Coordinates: 51°16′34.7″N 16°39′33.82″E
- Country: Poland
- Voivodeship: Lower Silesian
- County: Wołów
- Gmina: Brzeg Dolny

Naborów [naˈbɔruf] is a village in the administrative district of Gmina Brzeg Dolny, within Wołów County, Lower Silesian Voivodeship, in south-western Poland.
