= Rogówek, Wołów County =

Rogówek
- Village
- Location within Poland
- Coordinates: 51°29′07″N 16°36′58″E
- Country: Poland
- Voivodeship: Lower Silesian
- County: Wołów
- Gmina: Wińsko

Rogówek [rɔˈɡuvɛk] is a village in the administrative district of Gmina Wińsko, within Wołów County, Lower Silesian Voivodeship, in south-western Poland.
