= Trzcinica Wołowska =

- Village
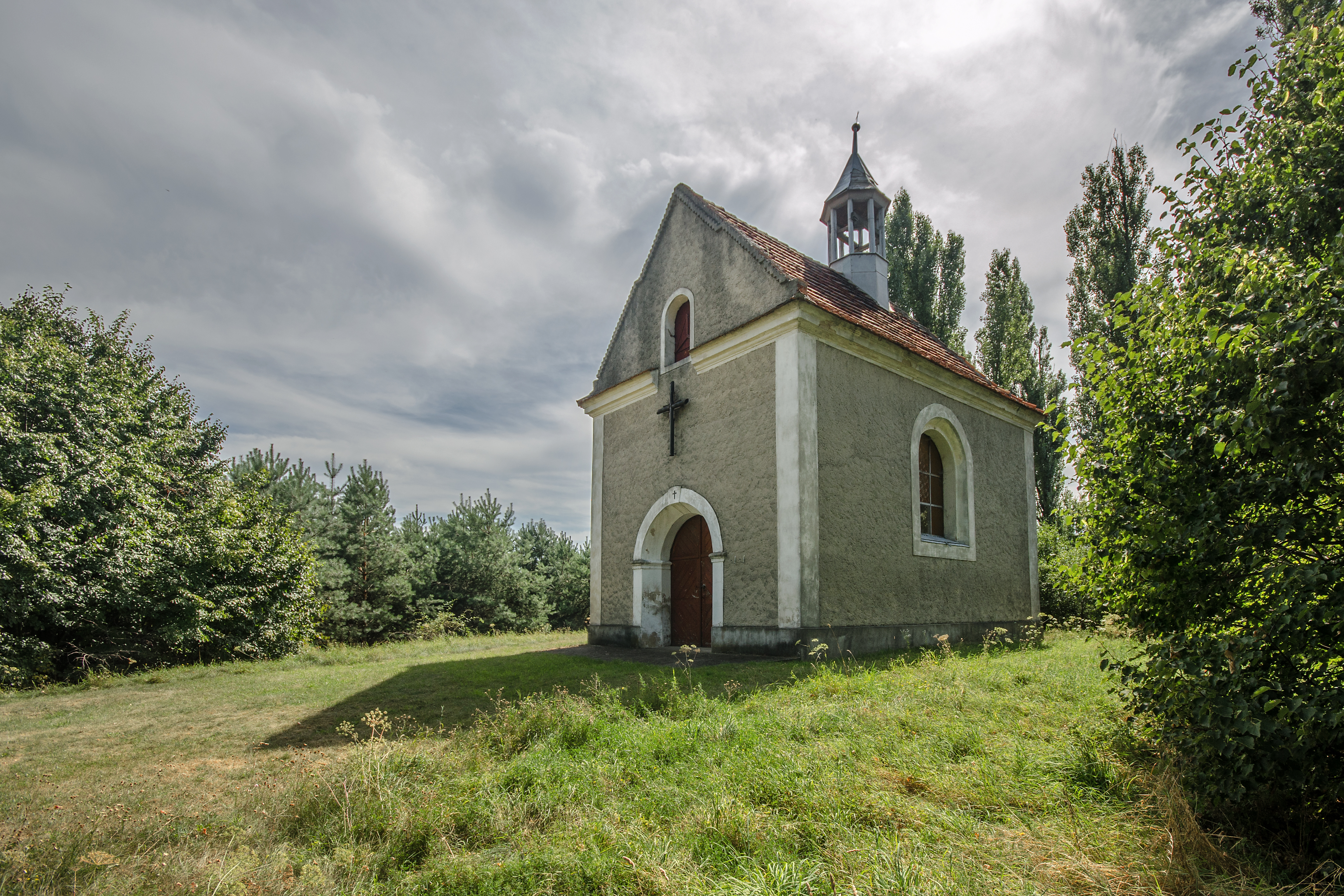
- Chapel

- Location within Poland
- Coordinates: 51°26′28″N 16°43′59″E
- Country: Poland
- Voivodeship: Lower Silesian
- County: Wołów
- Gmina: Wińsko

Trzcinica Wołowska [tʂt͡ɕiˈnit͡sa vɔˈwɔfska] is a village in the administrative district of Gmina Wińsko, within Wołów County, Lower Silesian Voivodeship, in south-western Poland.
