= Wyszęcice =

- Village
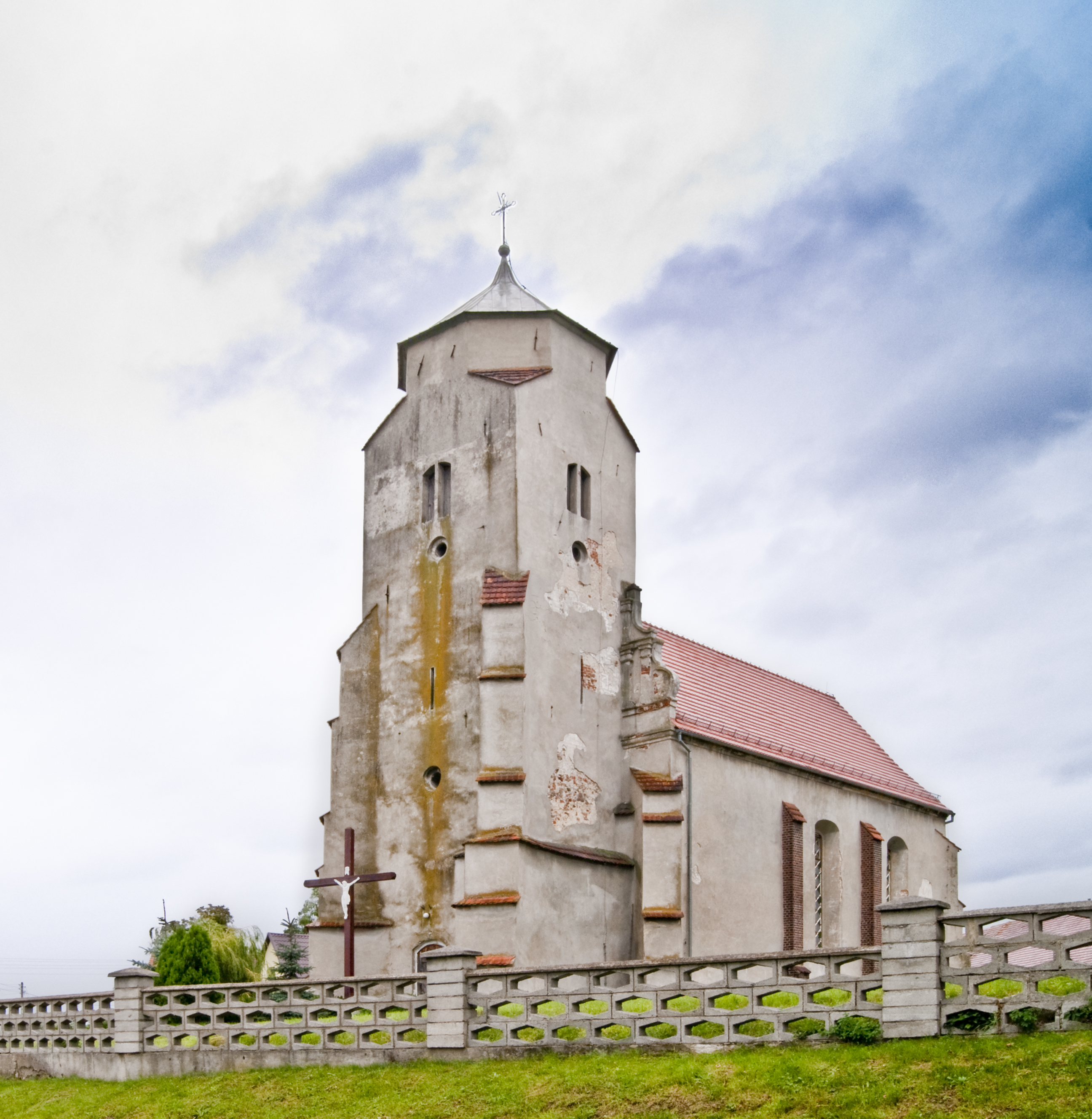
- Catholic church

- Location within Poland
- Coordinates: 51°28′N 16°31′E
- Country: Poland
- Voivodeship: Lower Silesian
- County: Wołów
- Gmina: Wińsko

Wyszęcice [vɨʂɛnˈt͡ɕit͡sɛ] is a village in the administrative district of Gmina Wińsko, within Wołów County, Lower Silesian Voivodeship, in south-western Poland.
