= Słup, Wołów County =

Słup
- Village
- Location within Poland
- Coordinates: 51°26′41″N 16°34′19″E
- Country: Poland
- Voivodeship: Lower Silesian
- County: Wołów
- Gmina: Wińsko

Słup [swup] is a village in the administrative district of Gmina Wińsko, within Wołów County, Lower Silesian Voivodeship, in south-western Poland.
