= Małowice, Lower Silesian Voivodeship =

Małowice
- Village
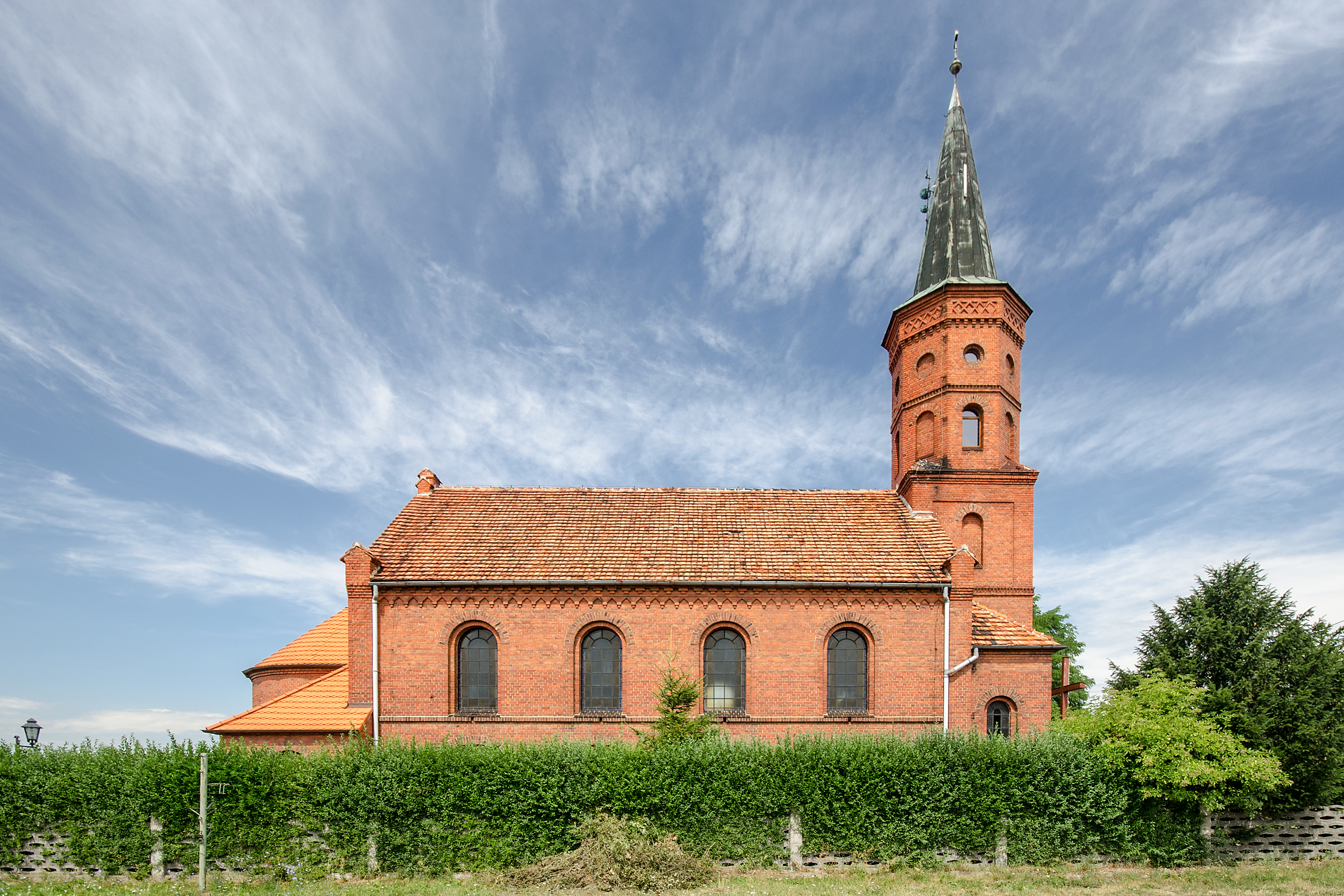
- Church in Małowice

- Location within Poland
- Coordinates: 51°24′29″N 16°28′16″E
- Country: Poland
- Voivodeship: Lower Silesian
- County: Wołów
- Gmina: Wińsko

Małowice [mawɔˈvit͡sɛ] is a village in the administrative district of Gmina Wińsko, within Wołów County, Lower Silesian Voivodeship, in south-western Poland.
