= Pysząca, Lower Silesian Voivodeship =

Pysząca
- Village
- Location within Poland
- Coordinates: 51°15′28″N 16°40′57″E
- Country: Poland
- Voivodeship: Lower Silesian
- County: Wołów
- Gmina: Brzeg Dolny

Pysząca [pɨˈʂɔnt͡sa] is a village in the administrative district of Gmina Brzeg Dolny, within Wołów County, Lower Silesian Voivodeship, in south-western Poland.
