= Hellmut von Gerlach =

German politician (1866–1935)

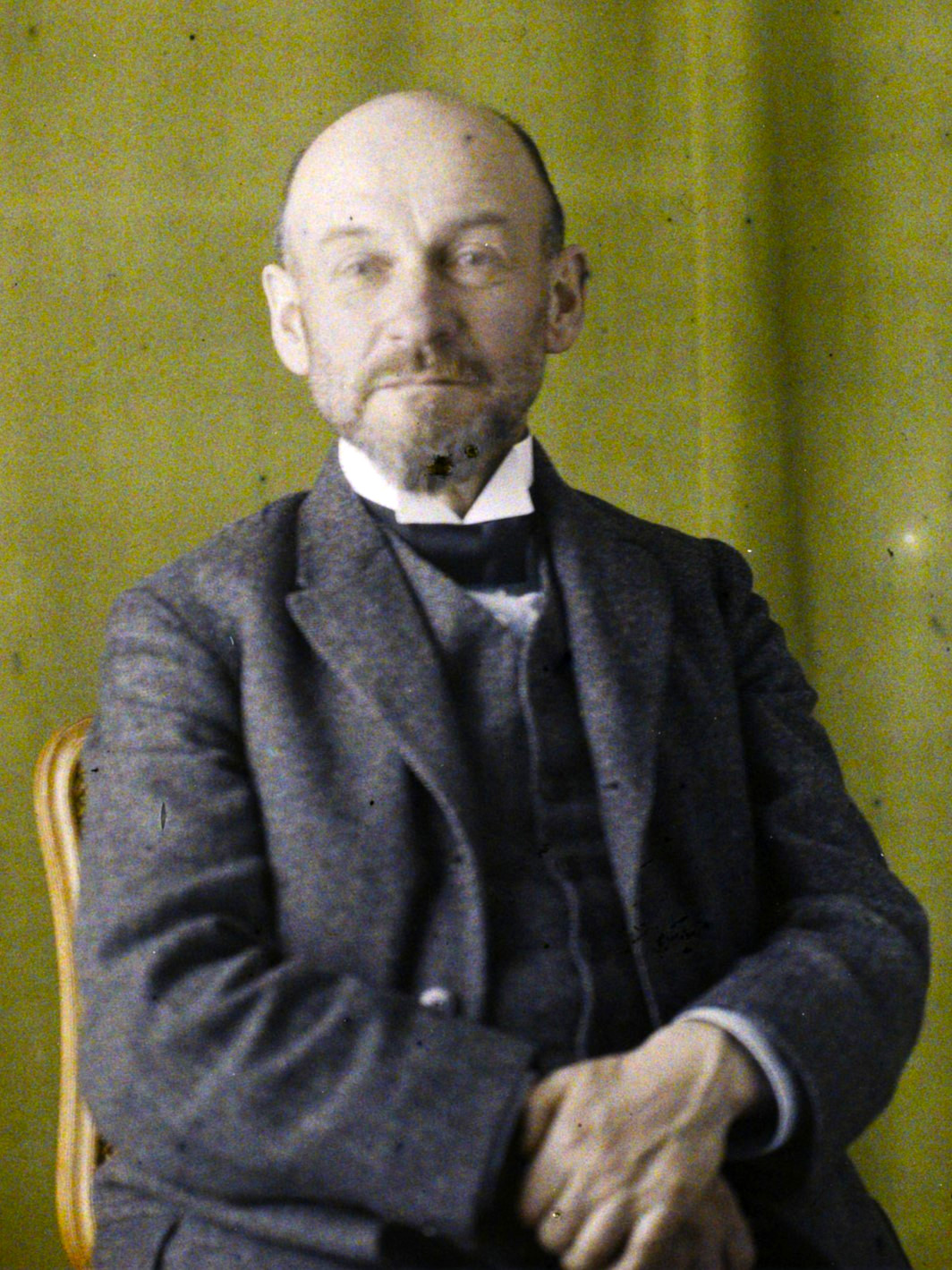
1924 Autochrome by Georges Chevalier.

Hellmut Georg von Gerlach (2 February 1866 – 1 August 1935) was a German journalist and politician.

== Life ==
Hellmut von Gerlach, the son of landowner Max von Gerlach, was born in Mönchmotschelnitz in Silesia. He studied law at the universities of Ghent, Strasbourg, Leipzig, and Berlin, and was a member of the Verein Deutscher Studenten. Afterwards, he obtained a position in the Prussian civil service.

In 1892, Gerlach retired from the civil service, to work full-time on politics and journalism. At first, he was close to the Christian Social, but also anti-Semitic, politics of Adolf Stoecker and his Christian Social Party. He would later leave this party though, and join Friedrich Naumann's National-Social Association, becoming more entrenched with political liberal ideas. From 1892 to 1896, he worked as an editor of the Christian-social daily newspaper Das Volk.

From 1898 to 1901, and from 1906 onwards, Gerlach was editor of the Berlin weekly Die Welt am Montag. He was a member of the Reichstag for the National-Social Association from 1903 to 1907, and would join the Freeminded Union after the National-Social Association was dissolved. In 1908, he became co-founder of the Democratic Union.

During the First World War, Gerlach took on a pacifist stance. Together with Friedrich Naumann he was one of the founders of the new liberal party, the German Democratic Party (DDP) in the first years of the Weimar Republic. He became a deputy state secretary in the Prussian province, working on German-Polish relations.

In 1919, Gerlach entered the board of the International Peace Bureau. As a journalist, he worked against those who still had lingering feelings for the German monarchy. He would also write for a better understanding between Germany and France in the Welt am Montag. In 1922, he left the DDP, to become chairman in 1926 of the German Human Rights League.

When Carl von Ossietzky was arrested in 1932, Gerlach took over the editorial duties of the magazine Die Weltbühne. After the Nazis took control over Germany in 1933, Gerlach fled to Austria first, then to France on the invitation of the Ligue des droits de l'homme, where he could work on peace matters and against the Nazi regime. From the end of 1934 he headed the campaign for providing the Nobel Peace Prize to Carl von Ossietzky.

Gerlach died in Paris.

== See also ==
- Opposition to World War I
