= Gmina Wińsko =

Gmina Wińsko Wińsko Commune
- Gmina
- Coat of arms
- Interactive map of Gmina Wińsko
- Coordinates (Wińsko): 51°28′N 16°38′E
- Country: Poland
- Voivodeship: Lower Silesian
- County: Wołów
- Seat: Wińsko

Area
  - Total: 249.54 km^{2} (96.35 sq mi)

Population (2019-06-30)
  - Total: 8,316
  - Density: 33.33/km^{2} (86.31/sq mi)
- Website: http://winsko.pl

Gmina Wińsko is a rural gmina (administrative district) in Wołów County, Lower Silesian Voivodeship, in south-western Poland. Its seat is the village of Wińsko, which lies approximately 14 kilometres (9 mi) north of Wołów, and 48 kilometres (30 mi) north-west of the regional capital Wrocław.

The gmina covers an area of 249.54 square kilometres (96.3 sq mi), and as of 2019 its total population was 8,316.

== Neighbouring gminas ==
Gmina Wińsko is bordered by the gminas of Jemielno, Prusice, Rudna, Ścinawa, Wąsosz, Wołów and Żmigród.

== Villages ==
The gmina contains the 50 villages of Aleksandrowice, Baszyn, Białawy Małe, Białawy Wielkie, Białków, Boraszyce Małe, Boraszyce Wielkie, Brzózka, Budków, Buszkowice Małe, Chwałkowice, Czaplice, Dąbie, Domanice, Głębowice, Gołaszów, Gryżyce, Grzeszyn, Iwno, Jakubikowice, Kleszczowice, Konary, Kozowo, Krzelów, Łazy, Małowice, Młoty, Moczydlnica Klasztorna, Morzyna, Mysłoszów, Naroków, Orzeszków, Piskorzyna, Przyborów, Rajczyn, Rogów Wołowski, Rogówek, Rudawa, Słup, Smogorzów Wielki, Smogorzówek, Staszowice, Stryjno, Trzcinica Wołowska, Turzany, Węglewo, Węgrzce, Wińsko, Wrzeszów and Wyszęcice.

== Twin towns – sister cities ==
Gmina Wińsko is twinned with:

- Meschede, Germany
