= Żerkówek =

- Village
- Location within Poland
- Coordinates: 51°17′16″N 16°41′56″E
- Country: Poland
- Voivodeship: Lower Silesian
- County: Wołów
- Gmina: Brzeg Dolny

Żerkówek [ʐɛrˈkuvɛk] is a village in the administrative district of Gmina Brzeg Dolny, within Wołów County, Lower Silesian Voivodeship, in southwest Poland.
