= Wały, Lower Silesian Voivodeship =

Wały
- Village
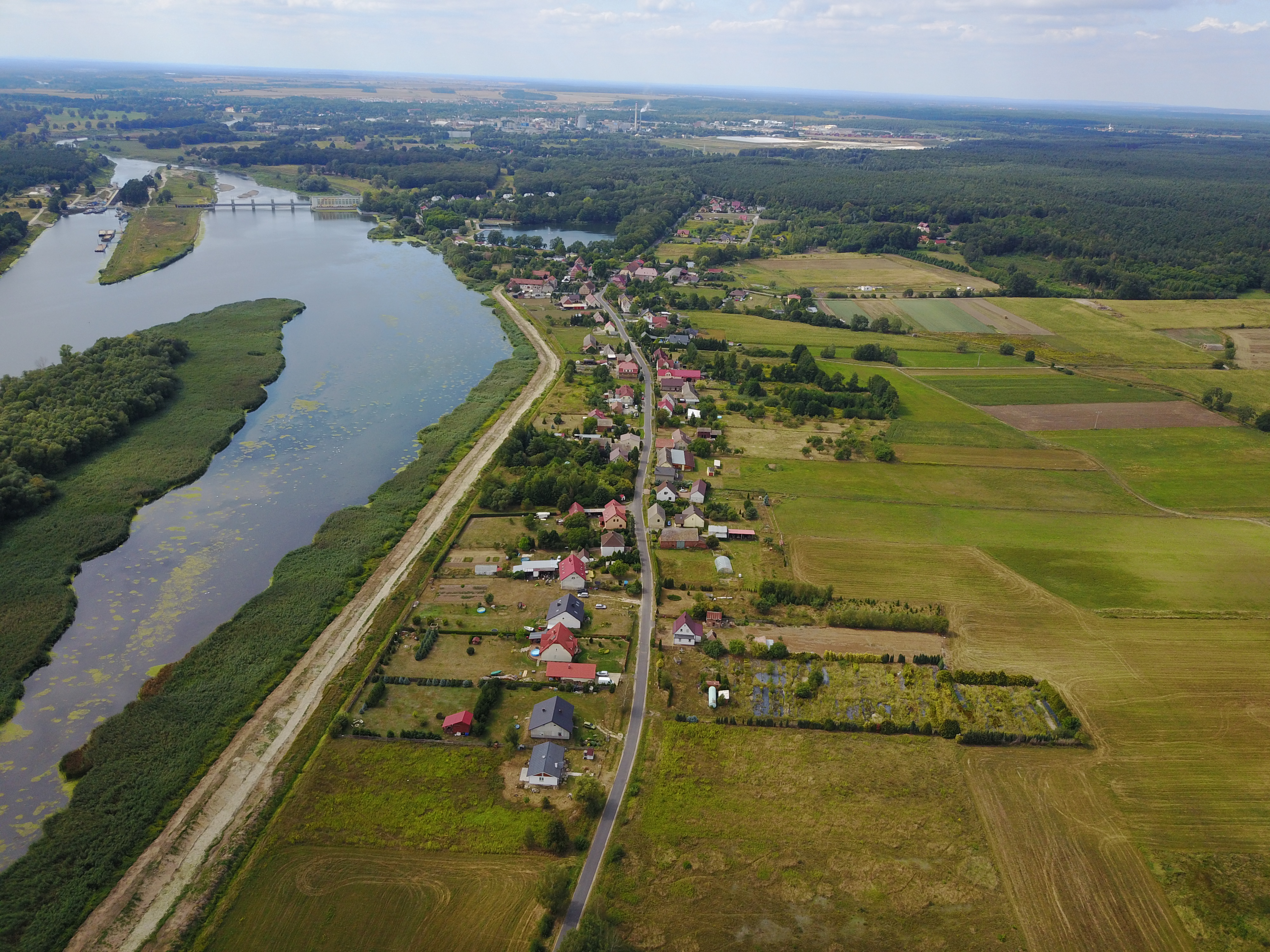

- Location within Poland
- Coordinates: 51°15′45″N 16°46′27″E
- Country: Poland
- Voivodeship: Lower Silesian
- County: Wołów
- Gmina: Brzeg Dolny
- Highest elevation: 120 m (390 ft)
- Lowest elevation: 109 m (358 ft)
- Population (approx.): 200
- Website: www.waly.brzegdolny.pl

Wały [ˈvawɨ] is a village in the administrative district of Gmina Brzeg Dolny, within Wołów County, Lower Silesian Voivodeship, in south-western Poland.
