= Wińsko =

- Village
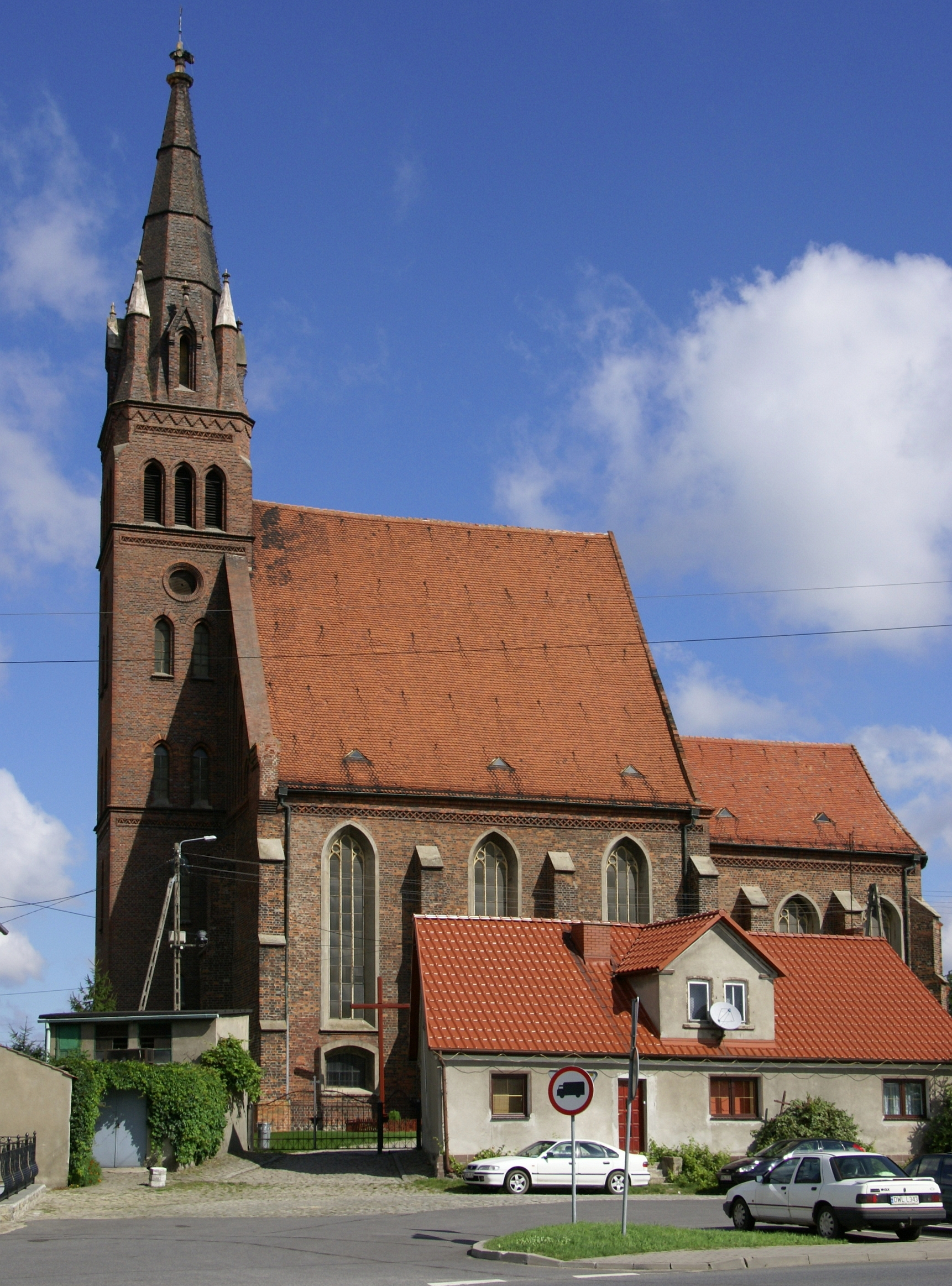
- Holy Trinity Church

- Location within Poland
- Coordinates: 51°28′N 16°38′E
- Country: Poland
- Voivodeship: Lower Silesian
- County: Wołów
- Gmina: Wińsko

Population
  - Total: 1,600
- Time zone: UTC+1 (CET)
  - Summer (DST): UTC+2 (CEST)
- Vehicle registration: DWL

Wińsko [ˈviɲskɔ] is a village in Wołów County, Lower Silesian Voivodeship, in south-western Poland. It is the seat of the administrative district (gmina) called Gmina Wińsko.

== History ==
It was granted town rights in 1285 by Duke Przemko of Ścinawa. In 1432, the town was ravaged by the Hussites. In 1512, King Vladislaus II established the coat of arms and an annual fair. In 1533, Duke Frederick II of Legnica granted a privilege to trade salt and grain. The town was ravaged by Croats in 1633 and Swedes in 1642.
