= Gmina Brzeg Dolny =

Gmina Brzeg Dolny Brzeg Dolny Commune
- Gmina
- Flag Coat of arms
- Interactive map of Gmina Brzeg Dolny
- Coordinates (Brzeg Dolny): 51°16′15″N 16°43′15″E
- Country: Poland
- Voivodeship: Lower Silesian
- County: Wołów
- Seat: Brzeg Dolny
- Sołectwos: Bukowice, Godzięcin, Grodzanów, Jodłowice, Naborów, Pogalewo Małe, Pogalewo Wielkie, Pysząca, Radecz, Stary Dwór, Wały, Żerków, Żerkówek

Area
  - Total: 94.4 km^{2} (36.4 sq mi)

Population (2019-06-30)
  - Total: 16,155
  - Density: 171/km^{2} (443/sq mi)
  - Urban: 12,511
  - Rural: 3,644
- Website: http://www.brzegdolny.pl

Gmina Brzeg Dolny is an urban-rural gmina (administrative district) in Wołów County, Lower Silesian Voivodeship, in south-western Poland. Its seat is the town of Brzeg Dolny, which lies approximately 11 kilometres (7 mi) south-east of Wołów, and 28 km (17 mi) north-west of the regional capital Wrocław. It is part of the Wrocław metropolitan area.

The gmina covers an area of 94.4 km^{2} (36.4 sq mi), and as of 2019 its total population was 16,155.

== Neighbouring gminas ==
Gmina Brzeg Dolny is bordered by the gminas of Miękinia, Oborniki Śląskie, Środa Śląska and Wołów.

== Villages ==
Apart from the town of Brzeg Dolny, the gmina contains the villages of Bukowice, Godzięcin, Grodzanów, Jodłowice, Naborów, Pogalewo Małe, Pogalewo Wielkie, Pysząca, Radecz, Stary Dwór, Wały, Żerków and Żerkówek.

== Twin towns – sister cities ==
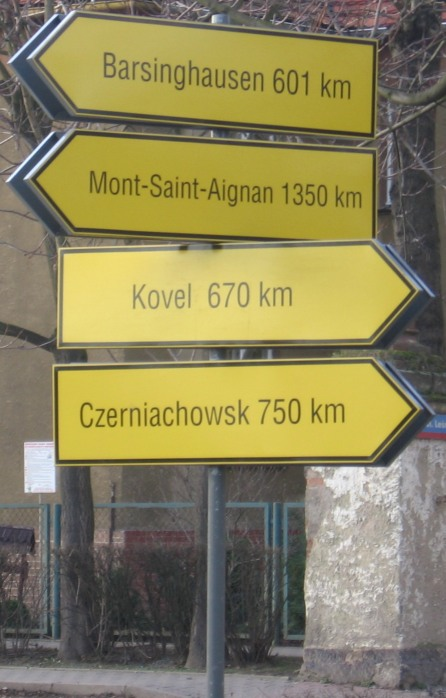
Signpost of twin towns

Gmina Brzeg Dolny is twinned with:

- Barsinghausen, Germany
- Chernyakhovsk, Russia
- Kovel, Ukraine
- Mont-Saint-Aignan, France
