= Żerków, Lower Silesian Voivodeship =

Żerków
- Village
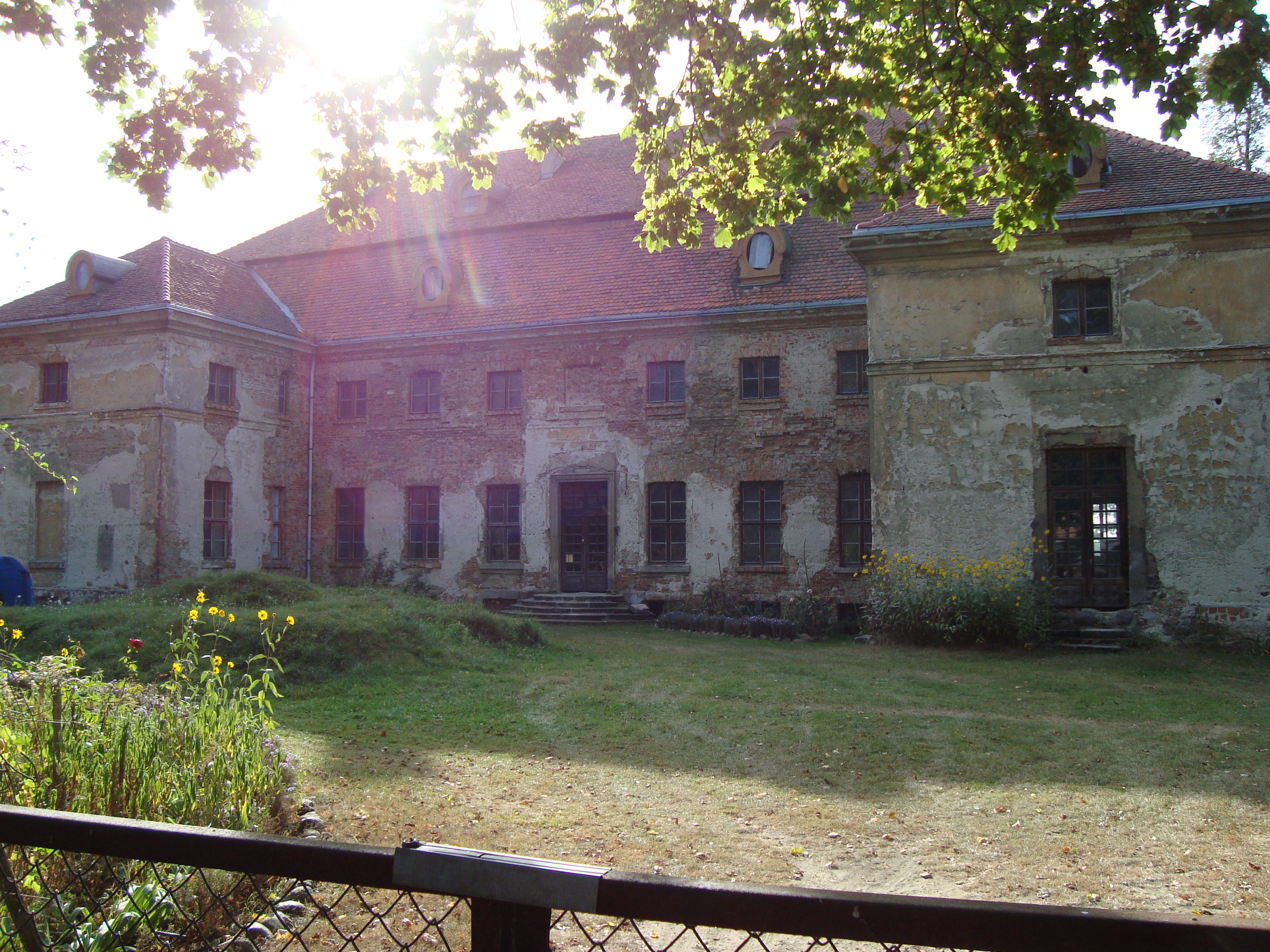
- Dilapidated manor in the village

- Location within Poland
- Coordinates: 51°17′53″N 16°42′05″E
- Country: Poland
- Voivodeship: Lower Silesian
- County: Wołów
- Gmina: Brzeg Dolny

Żerków [ˈʐɛrkuf] (German: Gross Sürchen) is a village in the administrative district of Gmina Brzeg Dolny, within Wołów County, Lower Silesian Voivodeship, in south-western Poland.
