= Rudawa, Wołów County =

Rudawa
- Village
- Location within Poland
- Coordinates: 51°26′52″N 16°40′41″E
- Country: Poland
- Voivodeship: Lower Silesian
- County: Wołów
- Gmina: Wińsko

Rudawa [ruˈdava] is a village in the administrative district of Gmina Wińsko, within Wołów County, Lower Silesian Voivodeship, in south-western Poland.
