= Brzózka, Lower Silesian Voivodeship =

Brzózka
- Village
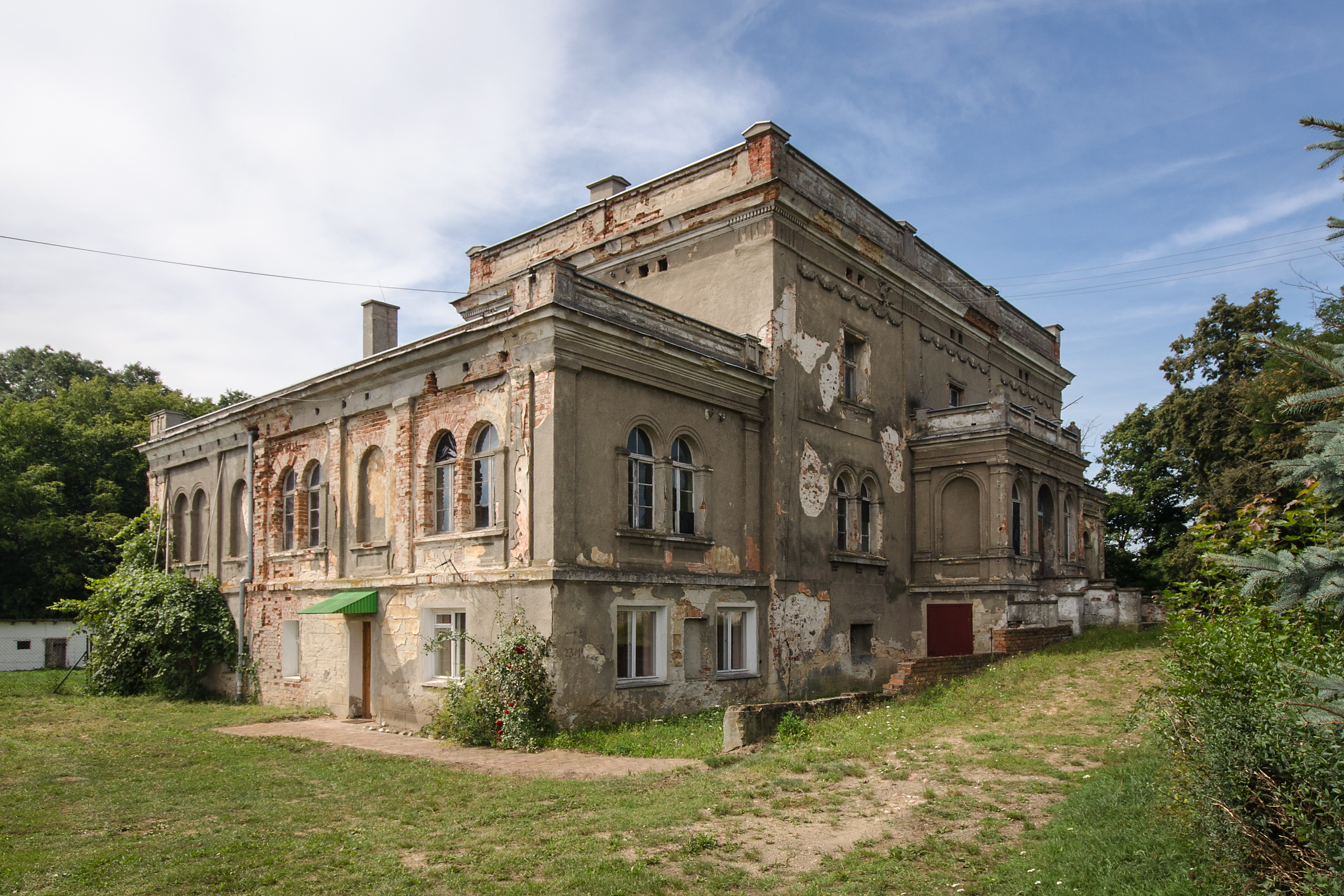
- Palace

- Location within Poland
- Coordinates: 51°27′42″N 16°41′34″E
- Country: Poland
- Voivodeship: Lower Silesian
- County: Wołów
- Gmina: Wińsko

Brzózka [ˈbʐuska] is a village in the administrative district of Gmina Wińsko, within Wołów County, Lower Silesian Voivodeship, in south-western Poland.
