= Aleksandrowice, Lower Silesian Voivodeship =

Aleksandrowice
- Village
- Location within Poland
- Coordinates: 51°26′33″N 16°47′12″E
- Country: Poland
- Voivodeship: Lower Silesian
- County: Wołów
- Gmina: Wińsko

Aleksandrowice [alɛksandrɔˈvit͡sɛ] is a village in the administrative district of Gmina Wińsko, within Wołów County, Lower Silesian Voivodeship, in south-western Poland.
