= Rudawa, Lesser Poland Voivodeship =

Rudawa
- Village
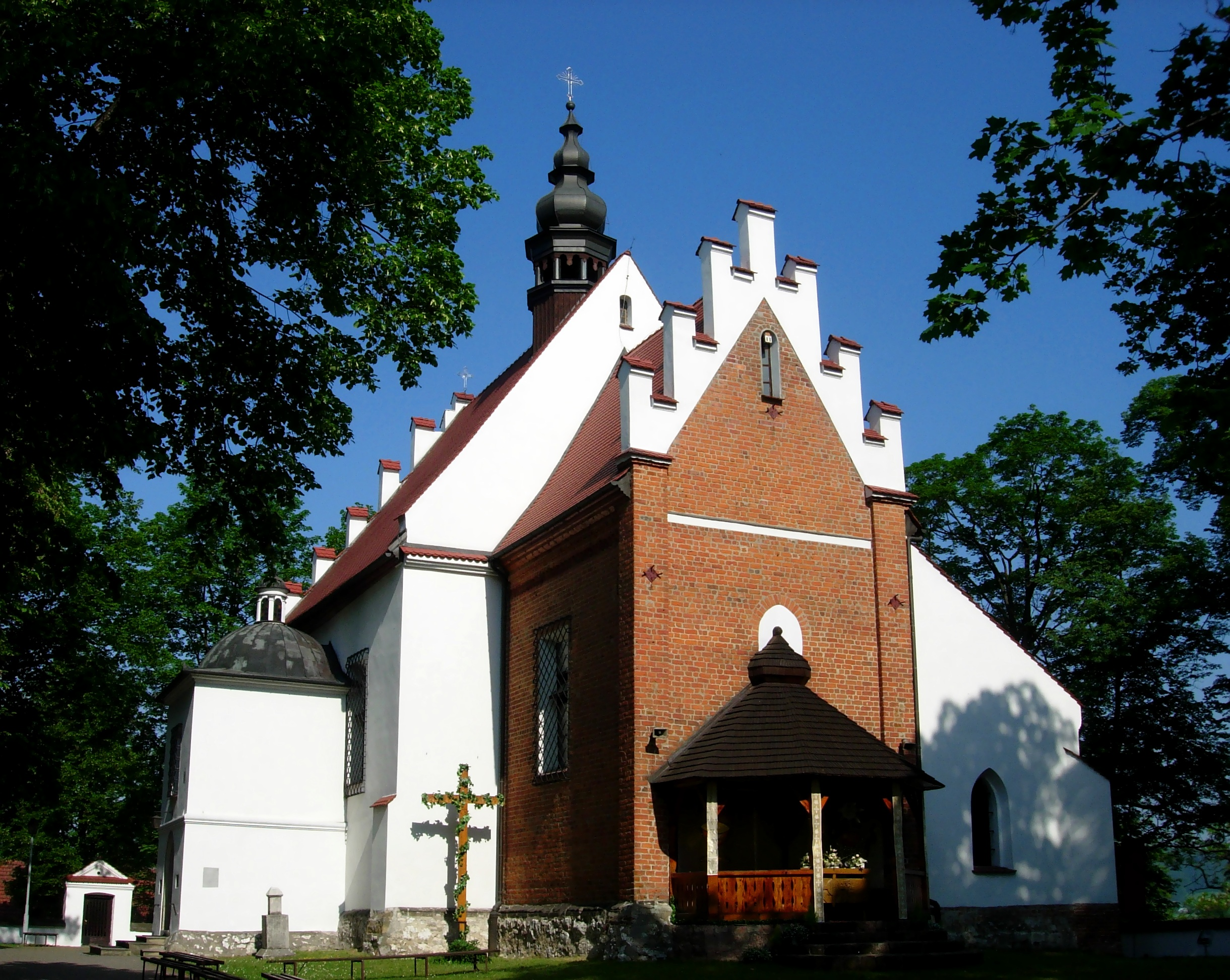

- Location within Poland
- Coordinates: 50°07′01″N 19°42′00″E
- Country: Poland
- Voivodeship: Lesser Poland
- County: Kraków
- Gmina: Zabierzów

Population
  - Total: 1,700

Rudawa [ruˈdava] is a village in Kraków County, Lesser Poland Voivodeship, Poland. In the years 1975-1998 it was in Kraków Voivodeship. The village is on the road from Kraków to Trzebinia and located by the Rudawa river.

== Notable residents ==
- Henryk Sienkiewicz
- Adam Nawałka
