= Rudawa (river) =

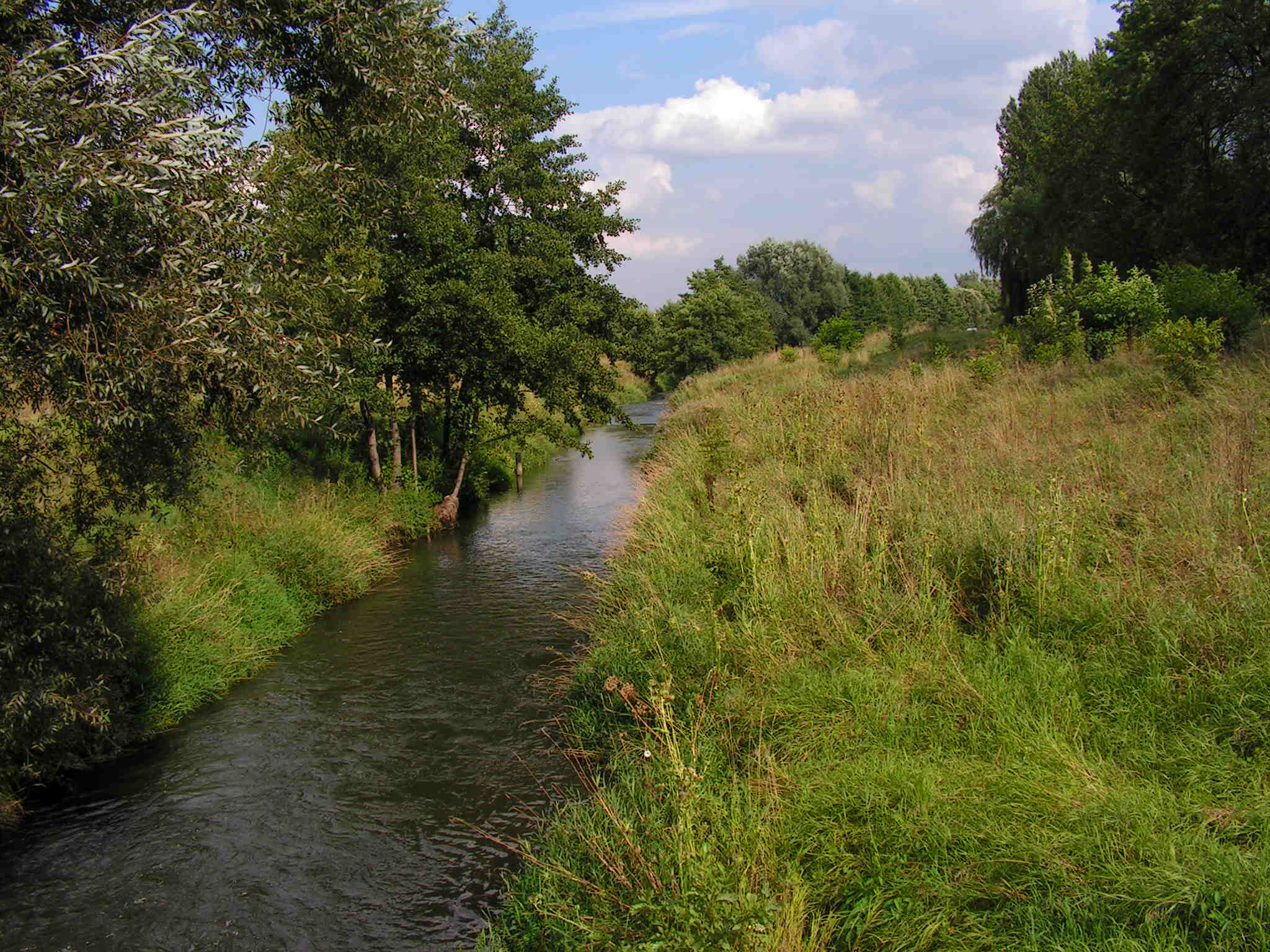
- Rudawa River and the surrounding landscape.

Location
- Country: Poland

Physical characteristics
- Mouth
  - location: Vistula
  - coordinates: 50.0517°N 19.9162°E
- Length: 35.4 km (22.0 mi)
- Basin size: 318.3 km^{2} (122.9 sq mi)

Basin features
- Progression: Vistula→ Baltic Sea
- River system: Będkówka, Kobylanka, Kluczwoda, Wierzchówka, Potok Olszanicki

The Rudawa is a small river in Lesser Poland Voivodeship, Poland. It is a tributary of the Vistula river. The Rudawa joins the Vistula in Kraków near the district of Zwierzyniec. Through the city, the flow of the river is controlled by artificial embankments. The Rudawa is also one of the sources of drinking water in Kraków with the water intake located in Mydlniki.

Every year, at the mouth of Rudawa River, there is a spring festival organized during Easter holidays. The river flows through a picturesque landscape featuring some of the more interesting geological and geomorphological Jurassic park areas, including Tenczyński Scenic Park, 11 km West of Kraków.

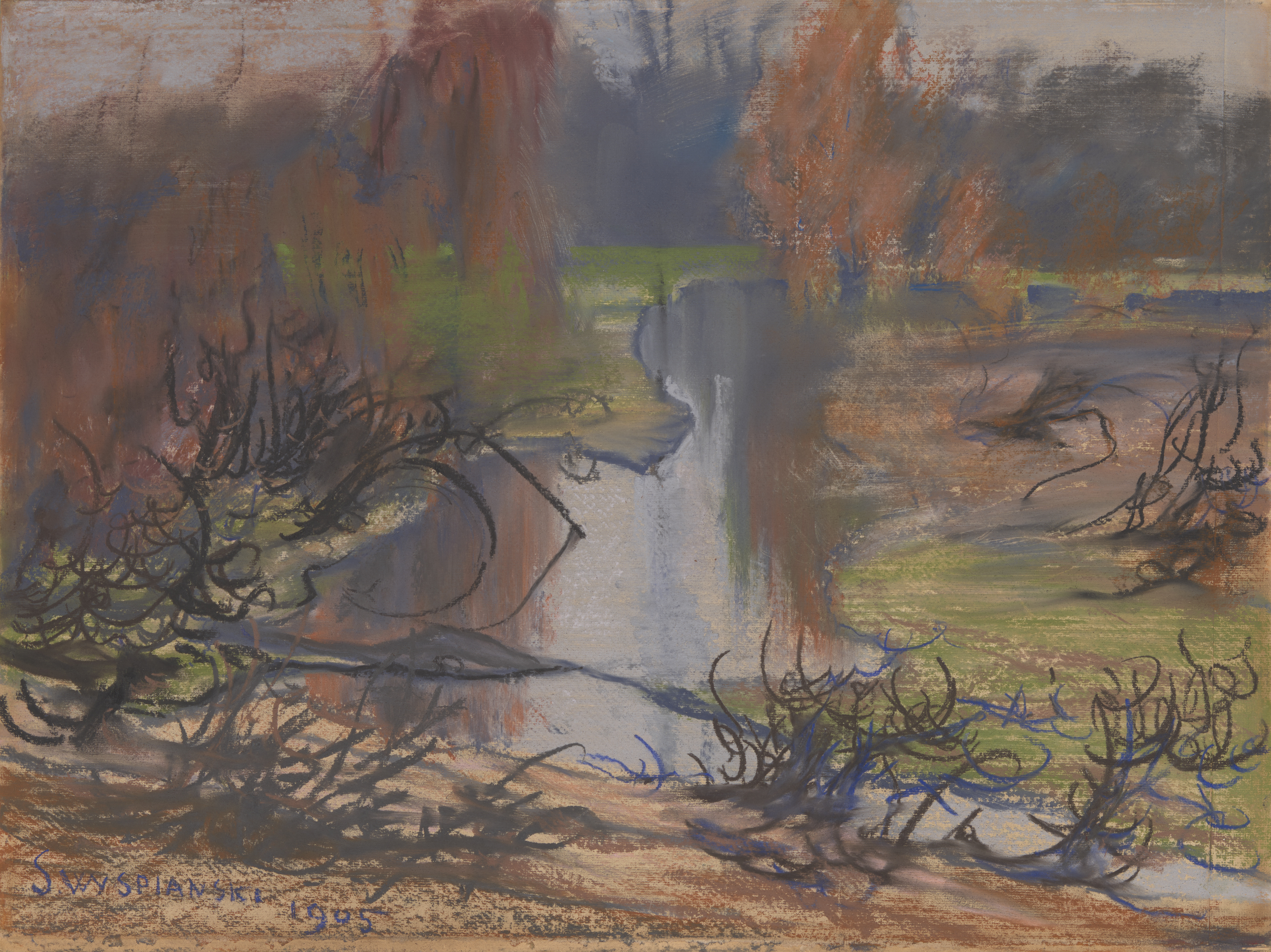
Rudawa by Stanisław Wyspiański

== General information ==
- Length: 35.4 km
- Watershed area: 318.3 km²
- Main settlements: Krzeszowice, Rudawa, Zabierzów, Kraków.
- Larger tributaries: Będkówka, Kobylanka, Kluczwoda, Wierzchówka, Potok Olszanicki.

== See also ==
- Rivers of Poland
