= Paul Majunke =

German journalist (1842–1899)

Paul Majunke (1842 in Groß-Schmograu – 1899) was a Catholic priest, journalist and Reichstag deputy.

Since 1871 he worked as first editor-in-chief for German newspaper Germania.
