= Wołów County =

Coordinates: 51°20′29″N 16°37′42″E

Wołów County Powiat wołowski
- County
- Flag Coat of arms

- Location within the voivodeship
- Country: Poland
- Voivodeship: Lower Silesian
- Seat: Wołów
- Gminas: Total 3: Gmina Brzeg Dolny; Gmina Wińsko; Gmina Wołów

Area
  - Total: 675 km^{2} (261 sq mi)

Population (2019-06-30)
  - Total: 46,914
  - Density: 69.5/km^{2} (180/sq mi)
  - Urban: 24,884
  - Rural: 22,030
- Car plates: DWL
- Website: www.powiatwolowski.pl

Wołów County (/ˈvoʊwʊf/, Polish: powiat wołowski [ˈpɔvjat vɔˈwɔfskʲi]) is a unit of territorial administration and local government (powiat) in Lower Silesian Voivodeship, south-western Poland. It came into being on January 1, 1999, as a result of the Polish local government reforms passed in 1998. The county covers an area of 675 square kilometres (261 sq mi). Its administrative seat is the town of Wołów, although the county also contains the slightly larger town of Brzeg Dolny.

As of 2019 the total population of the county is 46,914, out of which the population of Wołów is 12,373, the population of Brzeg Dolny is 12,511, and the rural population is 22,030.

== Neighbouring counties ==
Wołów County is bordered by Góra County to the north, Trzebnica County to the east, Środa County to the south, and Legnica County and Lubin County to the west.

== Administrative divisions ==
The county is subdivided into three gminas (two urban-rural and one rural). These are listed in the following table, in descending order of population.

Gmina	Type	Area (km^{2})	Population (2019)	Seat
Gmina Wołów	urban-rural	331.1	22,443	Wołów
Gmina Brzeg Dolny	urban-rural	94.4	16,155	Brzeg Dolny
Gmina Wińsko	rural	249.5	8,316	Wińsko
