= Lipnica =

Lipnica may refer to:

== Austria ==
- Leibnitz, Austria, a town in Styria that is called Lipnica in Slovenian

== Bosnia and Herzegovina ==
- Lipnica (Kakanj), a village in the municipality of Kakanj, Bosnia and Herzegovina
- Lipnica, Tuzla, a village in the municipality of Tuzla, Bosnia and Herzegovina

== Croatia ==
- Lipnica, Zagreb, a village near Zagreb
- Lipnica, Zagreb County, a village near Rakovec

== Poland ==
- Lipnica, Gmina Środa Śląska in Środa County, Lower Silesian Voivodeship, south-west Poland
- Lipnica, Wołów County, Lower Silesian Voivodeship, south-west Poland
- Lipnica, Kuyavian-Pomeranian Voivodeship, north-central Poland
- Lipnica, Lublin Voivodeship, east Poland
- Lipnica, Łódź Voivodeship, central Poland
- Lipnica, Pomeranian Voivodeship, northern Poland
- Lipnica, Świętokrzyskie Voivodeship, south-central Poland
- Lipnica, Subcarpathian Voivodeship, south-east Poland
- Lipnica, Słupca County, Greater Poland Voivodeship, west-central Poland
- Lipnica, Szamotuły County, Greater Poland Voivodeship, west-central Poland
- Lipnica, West Pomeranian Voivodeship, north-west Poland

== Serbia ==
- Lipnica (Knić), a village in the municipality of Knić, Serbia
- Lipnica (Loznica), a village in municipality of Loznica, Serbia

== Slovenia ==
- Lipnica, Radovljica, a village near Radovljica, Slovenia

== See also ==
- ]
- Lipnița
- Lipnitsa (disambiguation)
