= Lipnitsa =

Lipnitsa may refer to several settlements in Bulgaria and Russia:

- Lipnitsa, Belyayevsky selsovet, Konyshyovsky District, Kursk Oblast, a rural locality in Russia
- Lipnitsa, Platavsky selsovet, Konyshyovsky District, Kursk Oblast, a rural locality in Russia
- Lipnitsa, Sofia Province, near Kozarnika, Botevgrad Municipality, Bulgaria

== See also ==
- Lipnica (disambiguation)
- Lipnița
