= Domaszków =

Domaszków may refer to the following places in Poland:

- Domaszków in Gmina Międzylesie, Kłodzko County in Lower Silesian Voivodeship (SW Poland)
- Domaszków in Gmina Wołów, Wołów County in Lower Silesian Voivodeship (SW Poland)
