= RTV Palma =

Serbian television station

- Type: Terrestrial television
- Country: Serbia
- Headquarters: Ilije Garašanina 20 (Initially); Teodora Drajzera 19

Ownership
- Owner: Palma Ltd d.o.o.
- Key people: Miodrag Vujović

History
- Launched: 18 March 1993
- Closed: 26 December 2006; 19 years ago (Later reappeared intermittently without authorization)

Links
- Website: www.rtvpalma.co.yu

RTV Palma (Serbian: РТВ Палма, lit. Palm tree) was a privately owned television station based in Belgrade, Serbia. The station was owned by Palma Ltd, a company founded in October 1991 by Belgrade lawyer Miodrag "Miki" Vujović, and grew out of his earlier channel MV Channel Real Times, which began broadcasting business news and satellite programming in January 1992. TV Palma itself launched on 18 March 1993 as Belgrade’s sixth television station, initially broadcasting from premises linked to the newspaper Borba and the Socialist Party of Serbia (SPS). Press reports at the time noted speculation that Vujović’s stations were ideologically close to the SPS, which he denied.

In its early years TV Palma was known for a schedule dominated by turbo-folk music videos and late-night hardcore pornography, later adding pirated films, foreign satellite channels, telenovelas and imported US series. By late 1998 the station shifted its focus towards political and arts talk shows, including programmes associated with the Serbian Radical Party such as Radikalski talasi, alongside cultural, religious and entertainment formats. During and after the overthrow of Slobodan Milošević on 5 October 2000, TV Palma briefly suspended its signal and later broadcast Milošević’s first and only post-overthrow television interview. In late 2001 all political shows were cancelled and the programme was reoriented towards more commercial entertainment, a change described by one host as a precondition for the station to broadcast via satellite.

TV Palma was involved in several legal and regulatory disputes over broadcasting frequencies and licences. In the mid-1990s it unsuccessfully challenged BK Telecom over the use of the 12th channel. In 2001 Federal Minister of Telecommunications Boris Tadić listed TV Palma, TV Pink and BK Telecom among broadcasters that allegedly owed substantial unpaid fees and were “more than close” to the SPS, and in 2006 the Republic Broadcasting Agency (RBA) refused Palma a terrestrial frequency for Belgrade, a decision supported by the Democratic Party on grounds including hate speech and anti-democratic propaganda. The RBA ordered the shutdown of TV Palma’s terrestrial broadcasts in December 2006, after which the station reappeared intermittently via satellite, local transmitters and, from 2011, cable platforms until its cable licence was revoked on 8 January 2013 due to accumulated debt. The channel’s logo and visual style have since been referenced in Serbian hip hop and other popular culture, notably in the 2015 music video for Mimi Mercedez’s single “Suši”.

== History ==
TV Palma was owned by Palma Ltd, a company set up in October 1991 by Belgrade-based lawyer Miodrag Miki Vujović. On 18 March 1993, TV Palma was launched as Belgrade's sixth TV station. Initially, it broadcast on the 39th channel from 17:00 to 02:00, and was one of the first TV stations in Serbia to play hardcore pornography (starting at a quarter to 01:00). The adult segment was later moved to 02:00, but the decision was reversed after public outcry.

Vujović had already been running another TV station on the 34th channel, MV Channel Real Times, from 9 January 1992. The channel broadcast mainly business news and satellite reruns (MTV, Eurosport, The Children's Channel) and was sponsored by Jugoskandik, a fraudulent bank run by Jezdimir Vasiljević, Vujović's groomsman (kum). MV Channel Real Times was initially broadcast from the premises of Borba, a newspaper closely aligned with the ruling Socialist Party of Serbia. Also, TV Palma's headquarters was initially located on the premises of the SPS near Tašmajdan. Vujović had been renting the office from the party, of which he was also a member. For this reason, it was widely speculated that both TV stations were ideologically closely aligned with the socialists, which was denied by Vujović. By the end of 1993, TV Palma had started broadcasting on the 34th channel, leaving only the graveyard slot reserved for the MV Channel Real Times, which was eventually cancelled altogether.

In 1995, TV Palma tried to transfer to the 12th channel, challenging BK Telecom. The two stations went to court in late August 1995. In October 1995, the government officially granted the 12th channel to BK Telecom.

On 10 February 1997 Miki Vujović and Dragoljub Milanović, general director of RTS, signed a deal stating that the two TV stations would work on the conception and realization of a unified program. Similar deals were signed around that time by other stations, as it allowed them to bypass a public bidding for the bandwidth by aligning their programming with the RTS.

Following the renovation of the Magistrate in Zemun, the Serbian Radical Party, having signed a lease to the building for 30 years on 4 December 1998, signed a sublease to TV Palma. This was considered controversial as the SRS was part of the local government in Zemun at the time, and also subleasing was illegal. In May 2000 Vujović responded to accusations that the station was biased toward the SRS saying that any opposition party could pay for a show such as Radikalski talasi, and would be charged half the price.

During the overthrow of Slobodan Milošević on 5 October 2000 TV Palma stopped broadcasting at around 19:05, broadcasting only the message "We cannot continue broadcasting while the city is in flames". The first guest following the overthrow was Dragoljub Mićunović.

Following investigations by the new local government in Zemun, in June 2001 Federal Minister of Telecommunications Boris Tadić came out with information that three television networks that were "more than close to the SPS" - TV Pink, BK Telecom and TV Palma owed 2,1 million DM in total.

In April 2006 TV Palma and several other TV stations applied for broadcasting rights on the territory of Belgrade. Four NGOs, including the Youth Initiative for Human Rights, put out a statement saying that the council making the decision was "seeming to lose sight of its legal powers and boundaries, manifesting a lack of tolerance and was, akin to earlier ideological commissions, not hiding its intolerance towards media outlets whose editorial policy they did not like".

In July 2006 the Republic Broadcasting Agency decided that only TV Most, held by SPS member Dušan Bajatović, and TV Palma were denied broadcasting rights. The Democratic Party supported this decision stating that both stations were responsible for hate speech and anti-democratic propaganda during the SPS government. The same month, the Law on Broadcasting was amended giving the RBA the power to seize any frequency that was not awarded to a TV station.

On 26 December 2006 coercive measures were taken by the Republic Broadcasting Agency to prohibit the broadcasting of TV Palma.

During the first half of 2007, and for a short period in May 2008, TV Palma broadcast via satellite.

On 14 July 2007 TV Palma started illegally transmitting from its old transmitter in Zemun on the 36th channel, causing distortions to TV Enter, the station occupying that frequency at the time. Authorities took action and stopped the transmission on 18 July 2007 on the count of piracy.

In March 2009 Palma Ltd took the Republic Broadcasting Agency to court over the fact that the Council of the RBA did not have the legal capacity to prohibit the broadcasting of a TV station, a task normally deferred to Republic Telecommunications Agency. On 4 June 2009 the Supreme Court of Serbia ruled in favor of Palma Ltd. The RBA was forced to reexamine the request from July 2006 and, despite earlier indications, reiterated their earlier decision on 25 January 2010. TV Palma had been broadcasting during this period, starting in December 2009. Vujović even announced he had been planning on a fresh start with a new slogan - "Srpska, a svetska" ("Serbian, yet world-class").

Starting in late September 2011 TV Palma broadcast via cable (Kopernikus for Belgrade proper, and Avcom for Borča and Krnjača). Its license was revoked on 8 January 2013 as a result of its large accumulated debt.

== Programming ==
Early on, TV Palma's program consisted mainly of turbo folk music videos. However, after the launch of TV Pink, Palma found it hard to compete and started broadcasting pirated films and satellite TV programs, as well as telenovelas.

Already in 1994, TV Palma started sporadically broadcasting a number of US TV series including Dallas, Dynasty, The Colbys, Barnaby Jones, Remington Steele, The Flying Nun, The Big Valley, Cagney & Lacey, Tales of the Unexpected, Charlie's Angels, M*A*S*H, The Trials of Rosie O'Neill, The Young and Restless, Days of Our Lives and I'll Take Manhattan. Later, Palma broadcast a few US teen TV series including Dead at 21 and Kenan & Kel.

By late 1998, TV Palma shifted its focus to broadcasting a number of political and art shows. Around the turn of 1999, the late-night adult program was cancelled.

On 12 December 2000 TV Palma broadcast the first and only interview with Slobodan Milošević following his overthrow. This was condemned by several MPs from the Democratic Opposition of Serbia including Nebojša Čović.

In late 2001 TV Palma canceled all its political shows and started to orient itself to more commercial content. Talk show host Olivera Miletović confirmed in an interview for Ekspres in May 2001 that this was a precondition set by the US before Palma could be allowed to broadcast via satellite.

=== Political shows ===
- Dijalog (Dialogue), a talk show featuring monologues and one-on-one interviews, hosted by Miki Vujović
- Obračun pod Palmom (Clash under the Palm Tree), a talk show featuring a panel of guests, hosted by Miki Vujović
- Radikalski talasi (Radical Waves), a Serbian Radical Party propaganda show edited by Aleksandar Vučić and hosted by Ksenija Vučić
- Pitanja i odgovori (Questions and Answers), usually one-on-one interviews, hosted by Olivera Miletović, the show later switched to TV Palma Plus
- Mon Blan (Mont Blanc), a conspiracy theory show hosted by Third Position artist Dragoš Kalajić
- H2O, a talk show hosted by Blažo Popović
- Kompromis (Compromise), a talk show hosted by Marko Janković, who transferred from Studio B in 2001 following a controversial episode

=== Cultural, religious and entertainment shows ===
- Subotom na Palmi (Saturdays at Palma), a cultural show promoting the Faculty of Dramatic Arts at the University of Belgrade, edited and hosted by Maja Volk, switched to ART TV in 2000
- Čudesa stvaranja (The Miracles of Creation), a creationist show hosted by Miroljub Petrović
- Približavanje Hilandaru (Approaching Hilandar), a cultural show about the Hilandar Monastery hosted by Dušan Milovanović, Milutin Stanković and Dragan Tanasijević
- S blagoslovom u Treći Milenijum (With Blessings, into the Third Millennium), an Orthodox Christian show hosted by Dušan Milovanović and Milutin Stanković
- Minimaksovizija (Minimaks-o-vision), a daytime talk show hosted by Milovan Ilić Minimaks, transferred from TV Pink in 2000 following a dispute with the owner
- Nešto obično, nešto lično (Something Ordinary, Something Personal), a daytime talk show hosted by Lidija Manić
- Peta brzina (Fifth Gear), a motor sports show hosted by race car driver Peca Dobrohotov
- Putna torba (Travel Bag), a travel show hosted by Ivan Krivec
- 011 (the name refers to the calling code for Belgrade), a news show covering local politics and cultural events in Belgrade hosted by Aleksandar Ćirić
- Oaza (The Oasis), a nature documentary series filmed in Serbia, hosted by Gordana Andrić
- Visoke potpetice (High Heels), a fashion show hosted by Ivana Rajković
- Vitalis, an alternative medicine show hosted by Vesna Marinković Mičić

=== Telenovelas ===
- Čipke (Lace) — 1994-1996
- I bogati plaču (Los ricos también lloran) — 1995-1997
- Sebične majke (Madres egoístas) — 1996-1997
- S one strane mosta (Más allá del puente) — 1996
- Zabranjena ljubav (Sentimientos Ajenos) — 1996-1998
- Gušterov osmeh (O Sorriso do Lagarto) — after 1996
- Ljubavne veze (Lazos de Amor) — 1997-1999
- Krivica (The Guilt (1996)) — 1997-1998
- Mali grad Infijerno (Pueblo chico, infierno grande) — 1998-1999
- Antonela (Antonella) — after 2000
- Suze i ljubav (Yo amo a Paquita Gallego) — 2001
- Sve za ljubav (Aunque me Cueste la Vida) — 2001
- Plima ljubavi (Marea brava (1999)) — 2002

== In popular culture ==
In December 2015 Serbian hip hop artist Mimi Mercedez released a music video for her single "Suši" (sushi). The logo of TV Palma was featured prominently, and the image was distorted to resemble turbo folk music videos as an homage to 1990s pop culture in Serbia.
