= Wodnica =

Wodnica may refer to the following places in Poland:

- Wodnica, Lower Silesian Voivodeship (south-west Poland)
- Wodnica, Pomeranian Voivodeship (north Poland)
