= Gliniany =

Gliniany may refer to the following places:

- Gliniany, Lower Silesian Voivodeship (south-west Poland)
- Gliniany, Świętokrzyskie Voivodeship (south-central Poland)
- Hlyniany, Lviv oblast, Ukraine (formerly Gliniany, Poland; and formerly in Galicia, Austro-Hungarian Empire)
