= Minimaks =

Serbian radio and television host (1938–2005)

- Минимакс
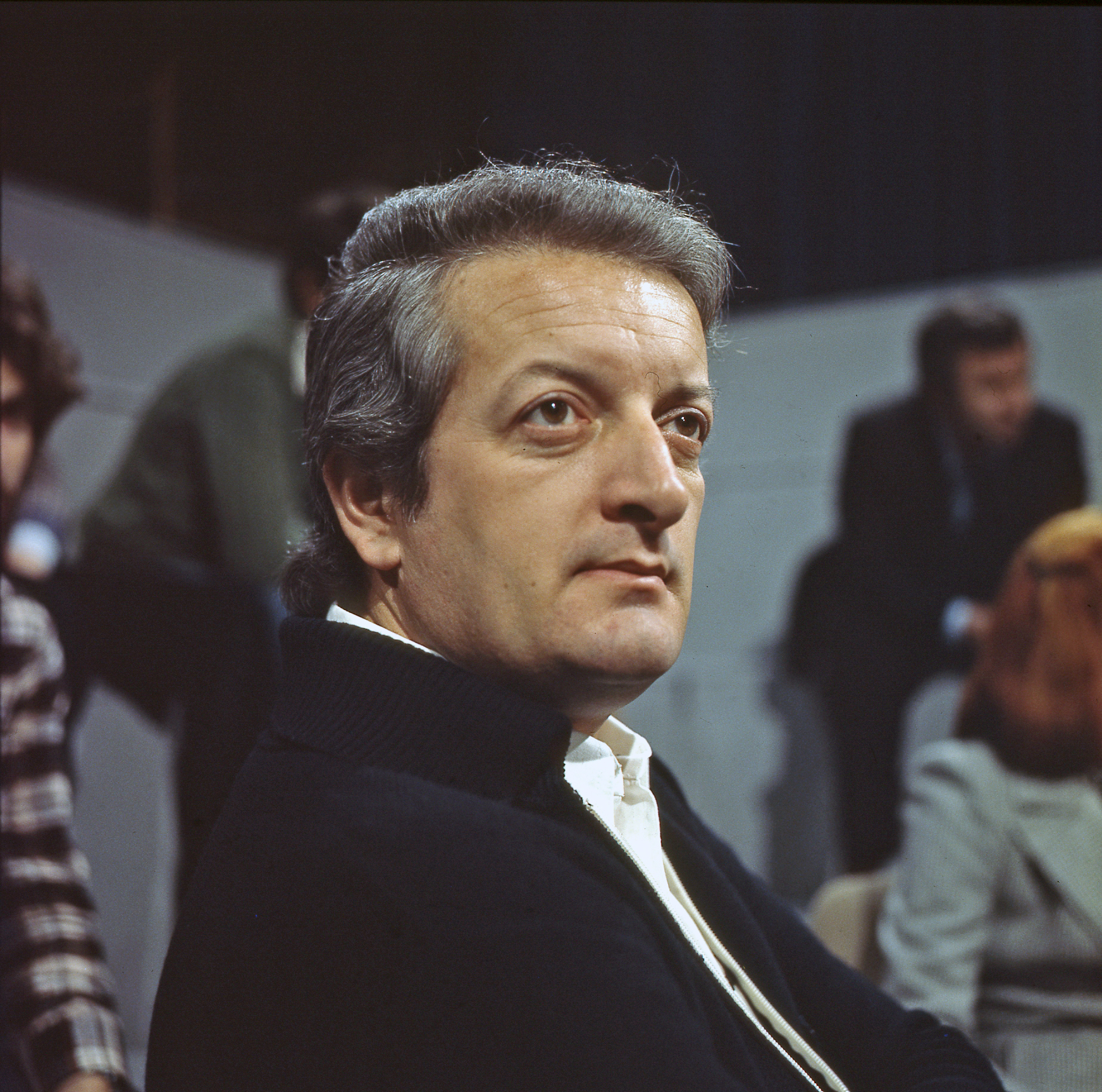
- Born: Milovan Ilić; 5 November 1938; Lipnica, Kingdom of Yugoslavia
- Died: 10 February 2005 (aged 66); Padua, Italy
- Occupations: Radio and television host

Milovan Ilić (Serbian Cyrillic: Милован Илић; 5 November 1938 – 10 February 2005), better known by his nickname and stage name Minimaks (Serbian Cyrillic: Минимакс), was a Serbian radio and television personality.

== Early life ==
He was born on 5 November 1938 in the village of Lipnica near Kragujevac, Yugoslavia. He completed primary and secondary school in Kragujevac, and studied law in Belgrade. He started in the satirical magazine Jež, and in 1960 he moved to Radio Belgrade.

== Career ==
He became known as the leader of the radio program Minimaks. This program was broadcast on Radio Belgrade in the 1970s. "Minimaks" was one of the first programmes in which there was a lot of popular music and its motto was "minimum talk, maximum music". He was one of the first unconventional journalists in Socialist Federal Republic of Yugoslavia who inserted jokes, witty remarks and jingles between the standard radio host notices.

With shows Sutra je petak (It's Friday Tomorrow) and Tačno u podne (Exactly at noon), better known as Tup-Tup, which he hosted for 22 years, he achieved great success. After cutting of his radio show, he continued his career on the Radio Television of Serbia, where he led the program Od glave do pete (From head to toe).

However, the show was taken off air in the 1990. He moved to RTV Politika where he hosted show Minimaksovizija. He later led shows Minimaksovizija, Maksovizija, Sunday with Minimaks and Fonto at TV Pink and TV Palma. Throughout his time on radio and television he promoted numerous up-and-coming folk singers, most notably Lepa Brena, even giving her the stage name.

Through his programs passed a large number of Serbian singers, musicians, actors, politicians and other public figures. For each guest Minimaks was thoroughly prepared using comprehensive documentation and news. He is the author of several books aphorisms and songs, as well as many columns in various newspapers. With his wife Biljana he had a daughter Hannah and son Vladimir, and from the first marriage, son Igor.

He worked with and knew many Balkan singers, including being manager to Silvana Armenulić, until her death in a car crash in 1976. Ksenija Pajčin worked as his assistant while trying to make a name for herself in the 1990s.

== Death ==
At the end of 2004, Minimaks received a liver transplant at the clinic of the University of Padua, where he died on 10 February 2005 at age 66.
