= Stobno, Lower Silesian Voivodeship =

Stobno
- Village
- Location within Poland
- Coordinates: 51°17′4″N 16°36′58″E
- Country: Poland
- Voivodeship: Lower Silesian
- County: Wołów
- Gmina: Wołów
- Time zone: UTC+1 (CET)
  - Summer (DST): UTC+2 (CEST)
- Postal code: 56-100
- Vehicle registration: DWL

Stobno [ˈstɔbnɔ] is a village in the administrative district of Gmina Wołów, within Wołów County, Lower Silesian Voivodeship, in south-western Poland.

== History ==
The settlement dates back to prehistoric times, and there are archaeological sites from the Bronze Age and the Early Middle Ages in Stobno. The earliest mention concerning this village dates from 1259, when it was part of Piast-ruled Poland, within which it was located since the late 10th century. As a result of the fragmentation of Poland, it was located within the Duchy of Głogów, which in 1506 was incorporated to the Kingdom of Bohemia, then ruled by the Jagiellonian dynasty, and after 1526 under the Habsburg Monarchy. In 1742 it was annexed by the Kingdom of Prussia, and from 1871 to 1945 it was part of Germany.
