= Garwół =

- Village
- Location within Poland
- Coordinates: 51°20′57″N 16°42′40″E
- Country: Poland
- Voivodeship: Lower Silesian
- County: Wołów
- Gmina: Wołów

Garwół [ˈɡarvuu̯] is a village in the administrative district of Gmina Wołów, within Wołów County, Lower Silesian Voivodeship, in south-western Poland.
