= Miłcz =

- Village
- Location within Poland
- Coordinates: 51°21′45″N 16°41′52″E
- Country: Poland
- Voivodeship: Lower Silesian
- County: Wołów
- Gmina: Wołów
- Time zone: UTC+1 (CET)
  - Summer (DST): UTC+2 (CEST)
- Vehicle registration: DWL

Miłcz [miu̯t͡ʂ] is a village in the administrative district of Gmina Wołów, within Wołów County, Lower Silesian Voivodeship, in south-western Poland.

== History ==
Since the Middle Ages, the area was part of Piast-ruled Poland, and later on, before becoming a part of Bohemia (Czechia), Prussia, and Germany. During World War II, it was the location of a forced labour subcamp of the Nazi German prison for youth in Wołów. In 1945, following Germany's defeat in World War II, the village became part of Poland again.

== Sports ==
The local football team is Sparta Miłcz. It competes in the lower leagues.
