= Pełczyn, Lower Silesian Voivodeship =

Pełczyn
- Village
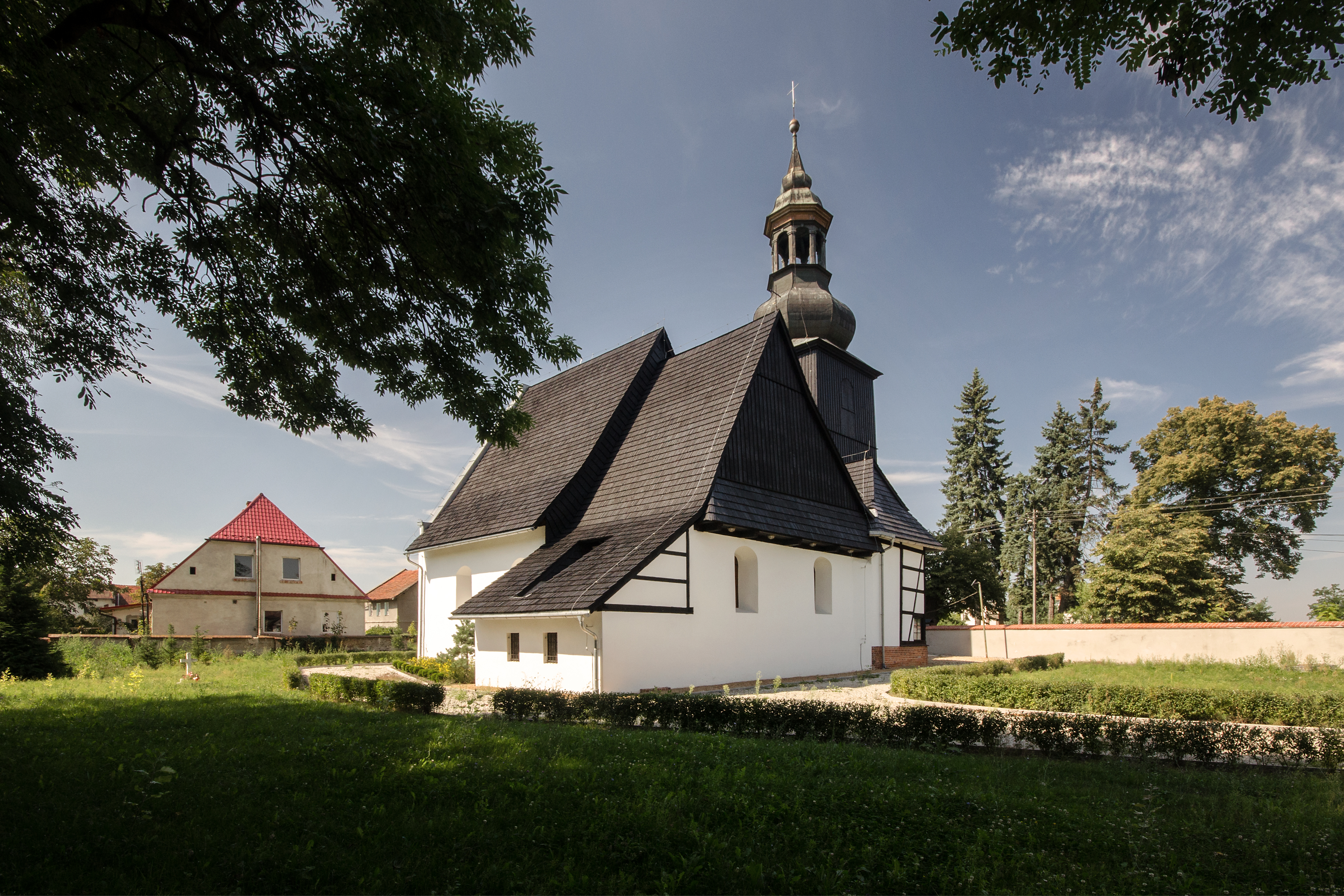
- "Pełczyn - Roman Catholic filial church of St. Teresa, 2nd half of the 17th century, early 20th century."

- Location within Poland
- Coordinates: 51°23′N 16°42′E
- Country: Poland
- Voivodeship: Lower Silesian
- County: Wołów
- Gmina: Wołów

Pełczyn [ˈpɛu̯t͡ʂɨn] is a village in the administrative district of Gmina Wołów, within Wołów County, Lower Silesian Voivodeship, in south-western Poland.
