= Rudno, Lower Silesian Voivodeship =

Rudno
- Village
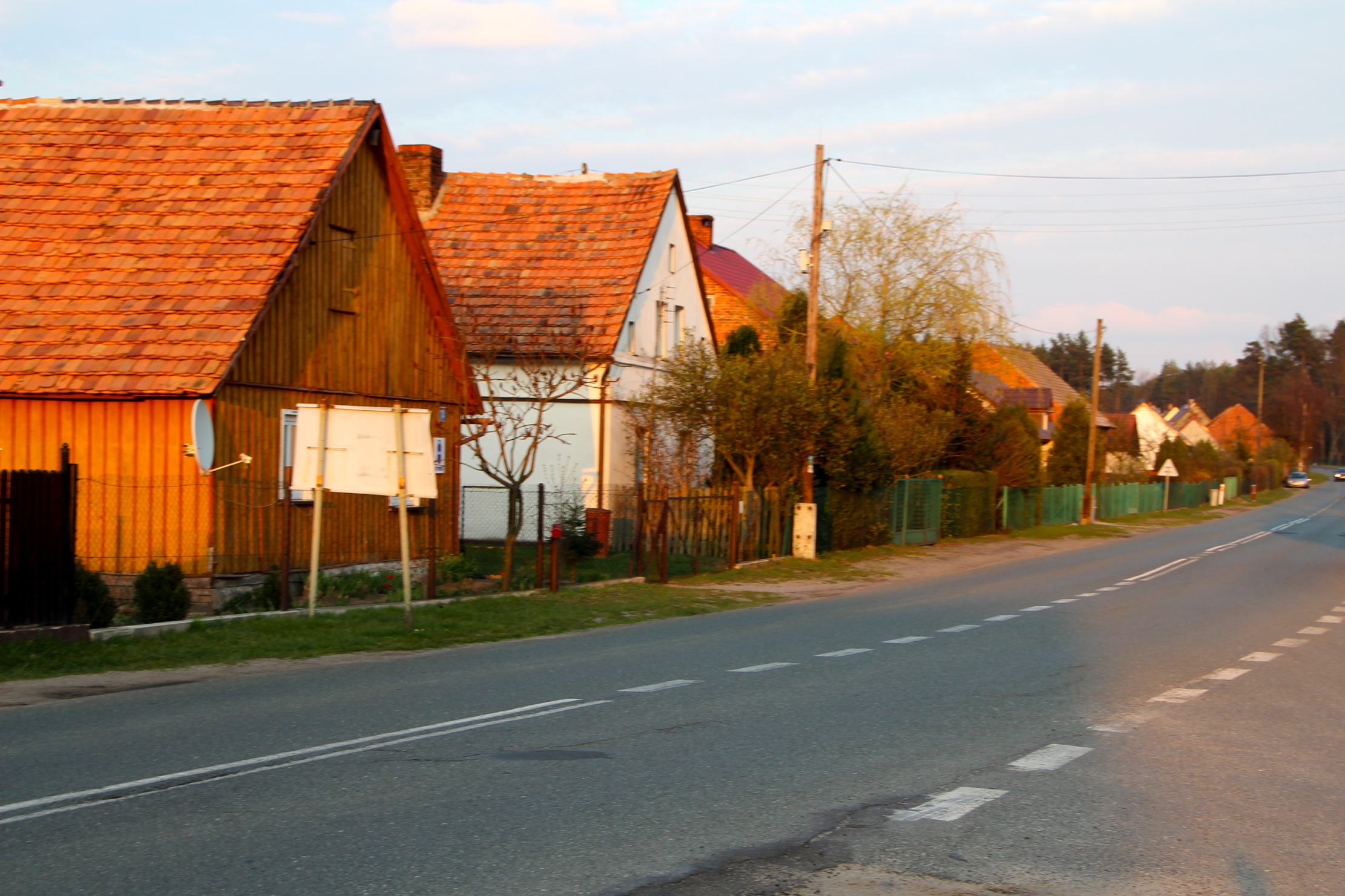
- Rudno (2012)

- Location within Poland
- Coordinates: 51°20′N 16°33′E
- Country: Poland
- Voivodeship: Lower Silesian
- County: Wołów
- Gmina: Wołów

Rudno [ˈrudnɔ] is a village in the administrative district of Gmina Wołów, within Wołów County, Lower Silesian Voivodeship, in south-western Poland.
