= Dębno, Wołów County =

Dębno
- Village
- Location within Poland
- Coordinates: 51°20′21″N 16°31′25″E
- Country: Poland
- Voivodeship: Lower Silesian
- County: Wołów
- Gmina: Wołów

Dębno [ˈdɛmbnɔ] is a village in the administrative district of Gmina Wołów, within Wołów County, Lower Silesian Voivodeship, in south-western Poland.
