= Stary Wołów =

- Village
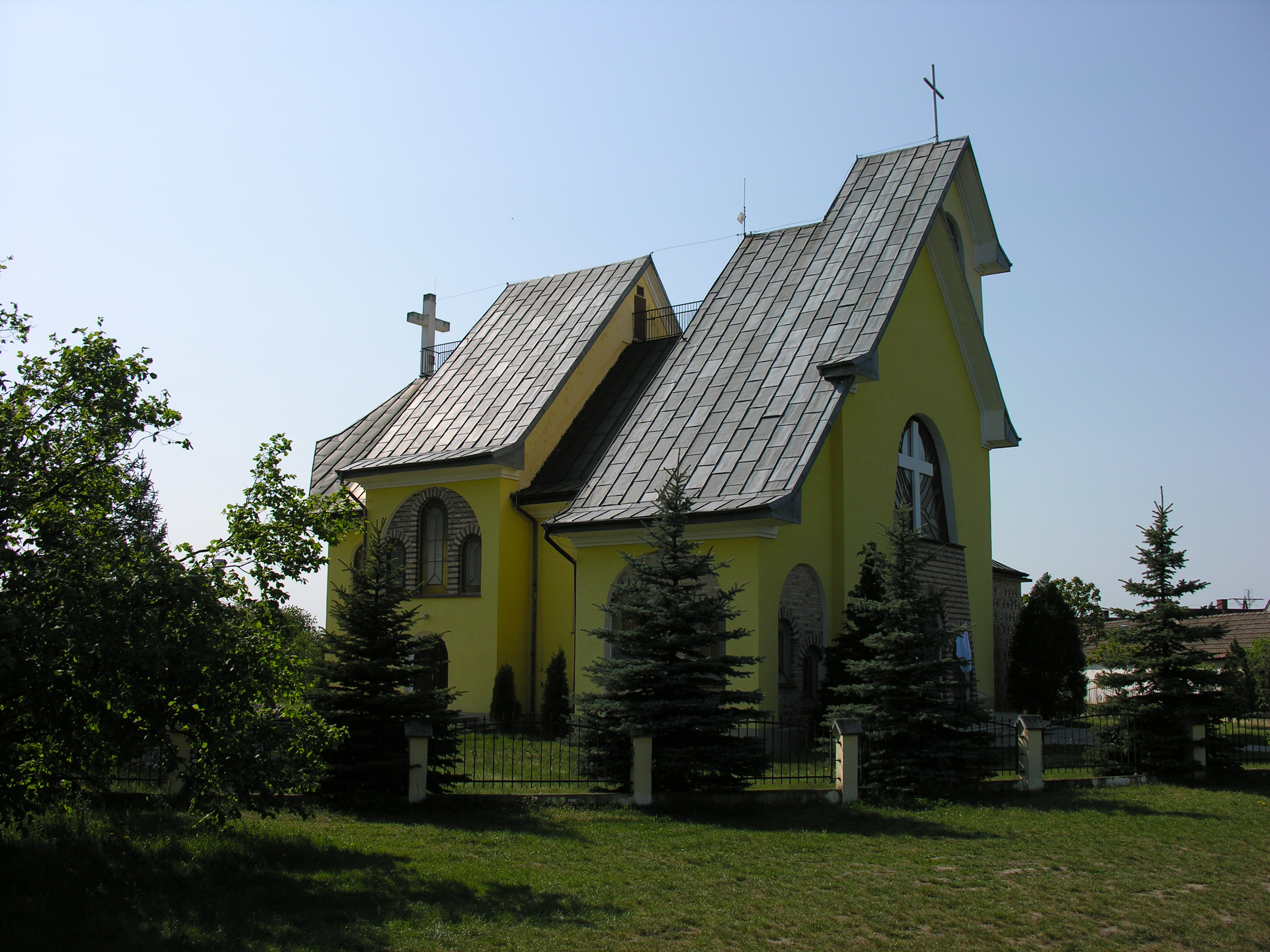

- Location within Poland
- Coordinates: 51°22′N 16°38′E
- Country: Poland
- Voivodeship: Lower Silesian
- County: Wołów
- Gmina: Wołów

Stary Wołów [ˈstarɨ ˈvɔwuf] is a village in the administrative district of Gmina Wołów, within Wołów County, Lower Silesian Voivodeship, in south-western Poland. The earliest mention concerning the village dates from 13th century.
