= Gmina Dębowa Łąka =

Gmina Dębowa Łąka Dębowa Łąka Commune
- Gmina
- Flag Coat of arms
- Interactive map of Gmina Dębowa Łąka
- Coordinates (Dębowa Łąka): 53°16′N 19°6′E
- Country: Poland
- Voivodeship: Kuyavian-Pomeranian
- County: Wąbrzeźno
- Seat: Dębowa Łąka

Area
  - Total: 86.13 km^{2} (33.25 sq mi)

Population (2006)
  - Total: 3,221
  - Density: 37.40/km^{2} (96.86/sq mi)
- Website: http://www.ugdl.pl/

Gmina Dębowa Łąka is a rural gmina (administrative district) in Wąbrzeźno County, Kuyavian-Pomeranian Voivodeship, in north-central Poland. Its seat is the village of Dębowa Łąka, which lies approximately 11 kilometres (7 mi) east of Wąbrzeźno and 42 km (26 mi) north-east of Toruń.

The gmina covers an area of 86.13 square kilometres (33.3 sq mi), and as of 2006 its total population is 3,221.

== Villages ==
Gmina Dębowa Łąka contains the villages and settlements of Dębowa Łąka, Kurkocin, Lipnica, Łobdowo, Małe Pułkowo, Niedźwiedź, Wielkie Pułkowo and Wielkie Radowiska.

== Neighbouring gminas ==
Gmina Dębowa Łąka is bordered by the gminas of Bobrowo, Golub-Dobrzyń, Kowalewo Pomorskie, Książki and Wąbrzeźno.
