= Proszkowa =

- Village
- Location within Poland
- Coordinates: 51°22′43″N 16°45′25″E
- Country: Poland
- Voivodeship: Lower Silesian
- County: Wołów
- Gmina: Wołów

Proszkowa [prɔʂˈkɔva] is a village in the administrative district of Gmina Wołów, within Wołów County, Lower Silesian Voivodeship, in south-western Poland.
