= Łososiowice =

- Village
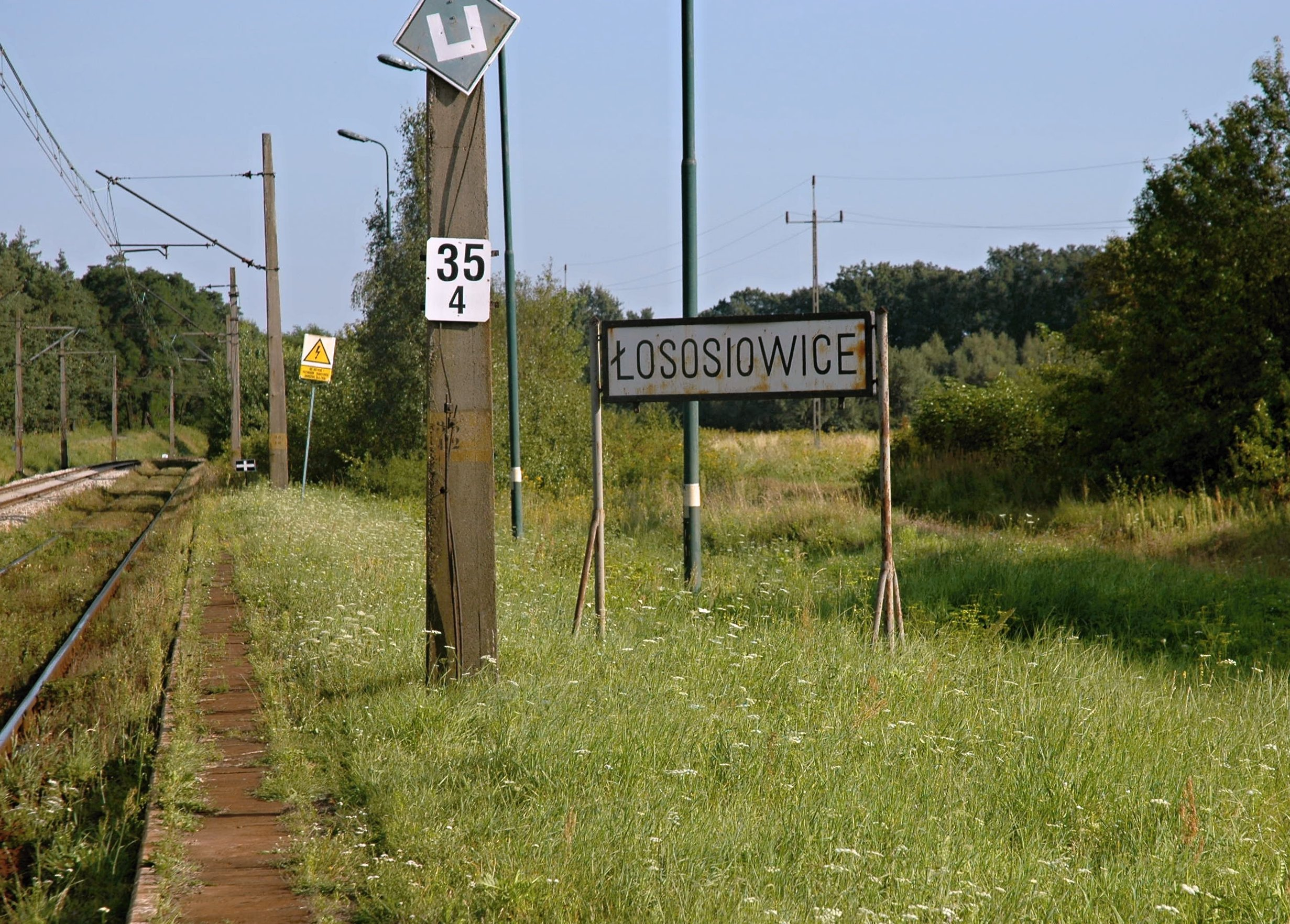
- Łososiowice stop

- Location within Poland
- Coordinates: 51°18′N 16°39′E
- Country: Poland
- Voivodeship: Lower Silesian
- County: Wołów
- Gmina: Wołów
- Population: 219

Łososiowice [wɔsɔɕɔˈvit͡sɛ] is a village in the administrative district of Gmina Wołów, within Wołów County, Lower Silesian Voivodeship, in south-western Poland.

The earliest mention concerning Łososiowice dates from 1208. It was destroyed in 1431 by the Hussite forces. In 1939 it had a population of 395.

There is a baroque church from 1701 built there, with an inside matroneum. It has three tombstones of Stober family. It had a functioning Roman Catholic parish until 1945. The last pastor of the village, Alois Pohl, died probably during the Soviet offensive of 1945.
