= Moczydlnica Dworska =

- Village
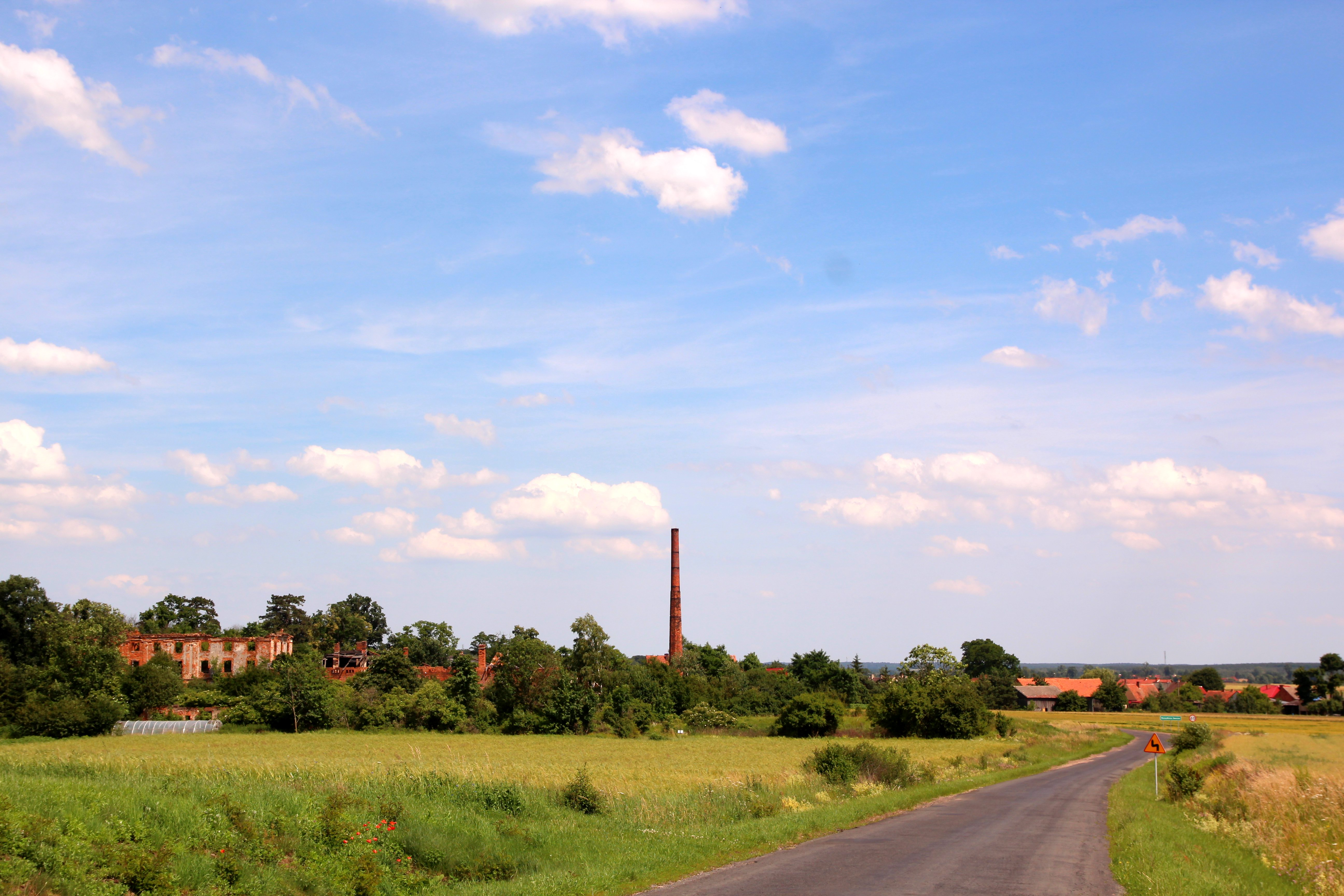

- Location within Poland
- Coordinates: 51°24′04″N 16°36′10″E
- Country: Poland
- Voivodeship: Lower Silesian
- County: Wołów
- Gmina: Wołów

Moczydlnica Dworska [mɔt͡ʂɨdlˈnit͡sa ˈdvɔrska] is a village in the administrative district of Gmina Wołów, within Wołów County, Lower Silesian Voivodeship, in south-western Poland. To the east of the village is an abandoned graveyard in which Franz Karl Achard is buried.

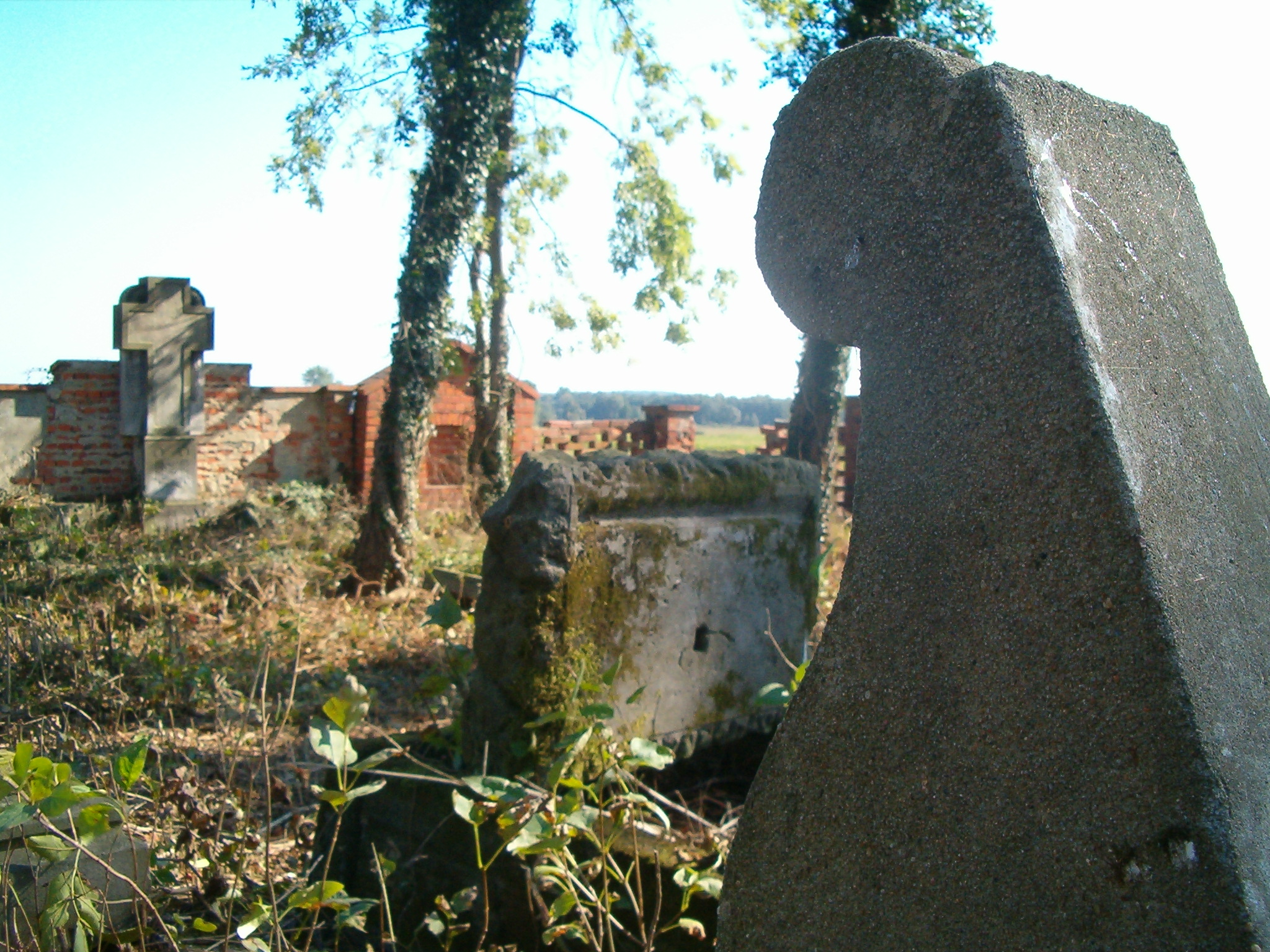
View of the graveyard
