= Łobdowo =

- Village
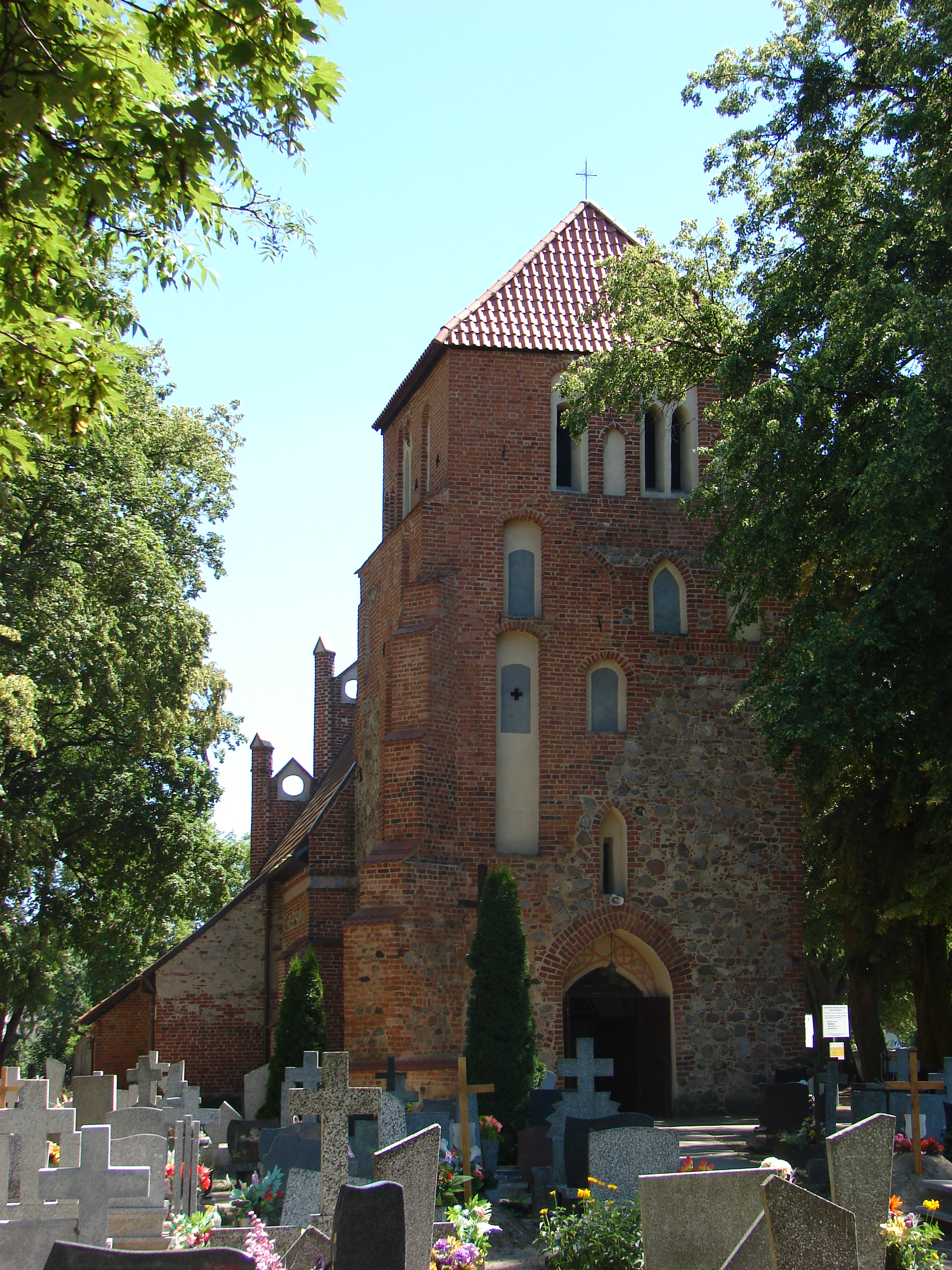
- Parish church of St. Margaret, 14th century.

- Location within Poland
- Coordinates: 53°13′N 19°8′E
- Country: Poland
- Voivodeship: Kuyavian-Pomeranian
- County: Wąbrzeźno
- Gmina: Dębowa Łąka

Łobdowo [wɔbˈdɔvɔ] is a village in the administrative district of Gmina Dębowa Łąka, within Wąbrzeźno County, Kuyavian-Pomeranian Voivodeship, in north-central Poland.
