= Dębowa Łąka =

- Village
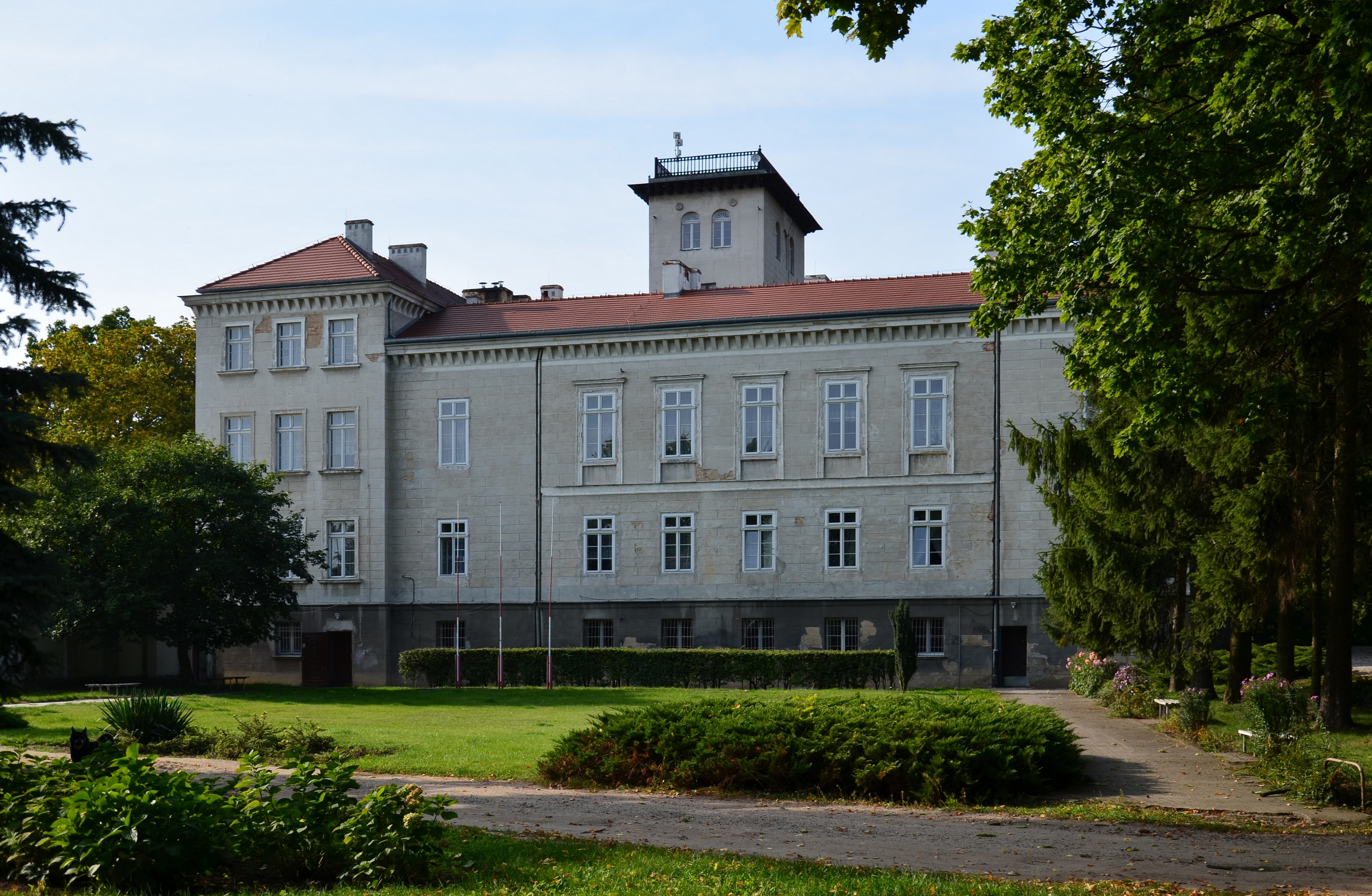
- Palace in the village

- Location within Poland
- Coordinates: 53°16′N 19°6′E
- Country: Poland
- Voivodeship: Kuyavian-Pomeranian
- County: Wąbrzeźno
- Gmina: Dębowa Łąka

Population
  - Total: 750

Dębowa Łąka [dɛmˈbɔva ˈwɔnka] is a village in Wąbrzeźno County, Kuyavian-Pomeranian Voivodeship, in north-central Poland. It is the seat of the gmina (administrative district) called Gmina Dębowa Łąka.
