= Kurkocin =

- Village
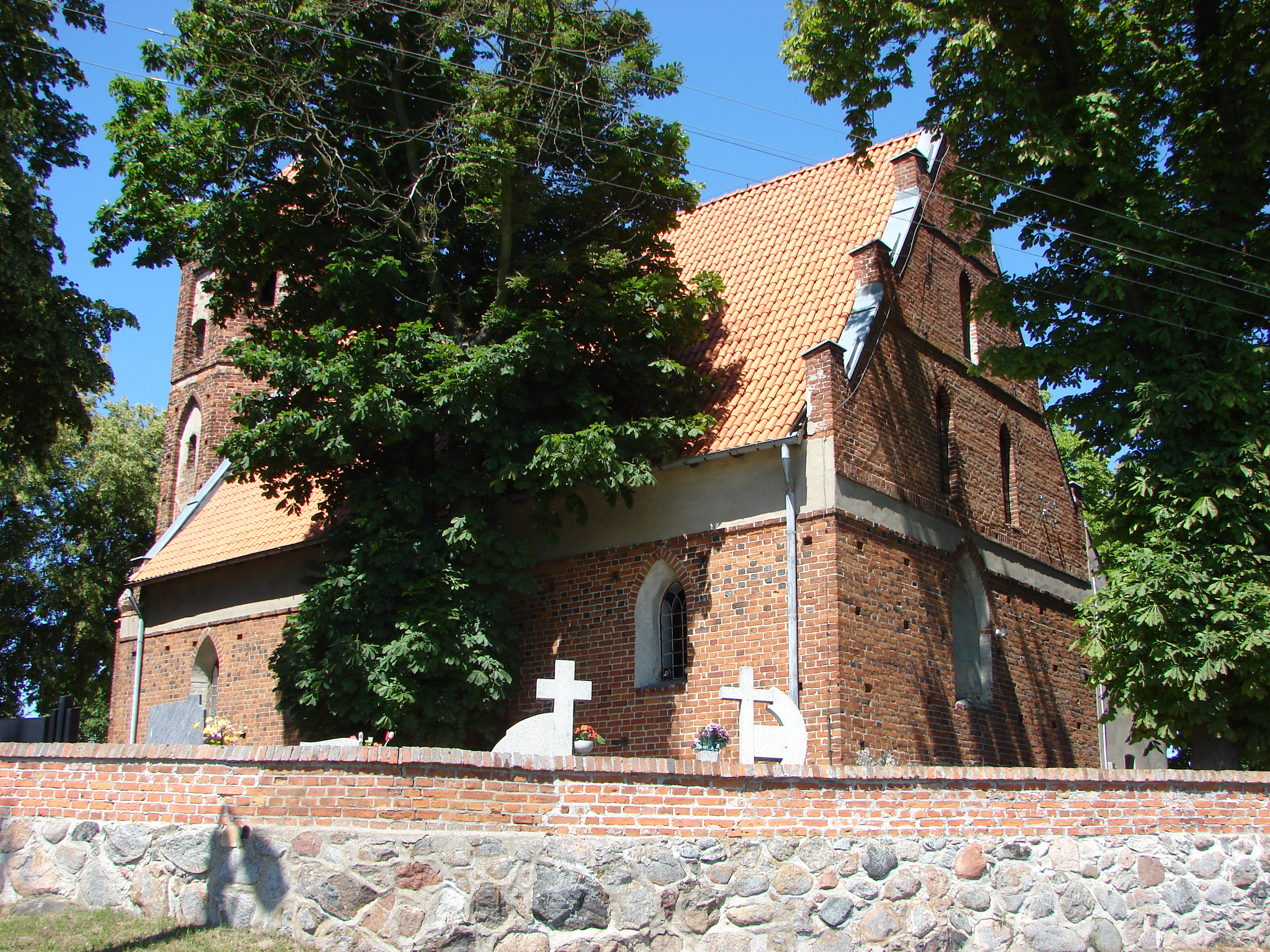
- Parish church of St. Bartholomew, 14th century.

- Location within Poland
- Coordinates: 53°14′N 19°5′E
- Country: Poland
- Voivodeship: Kuyavian-Pomeranian
- County: Wąbrzeźno
- Gmina: Dębowa Łąka
- Population: 337

Kurkocin [kurˈkɔt͡ɕin] is a village in the administrative district of Gmina Dębowa Łąka, within Wąbrzeźno County, Kuyavian-Pomeranian Voivodeship, in north-central Poland.
