= Stęszów, Lower Silesian Voivodeship =

Stęszów
- Village
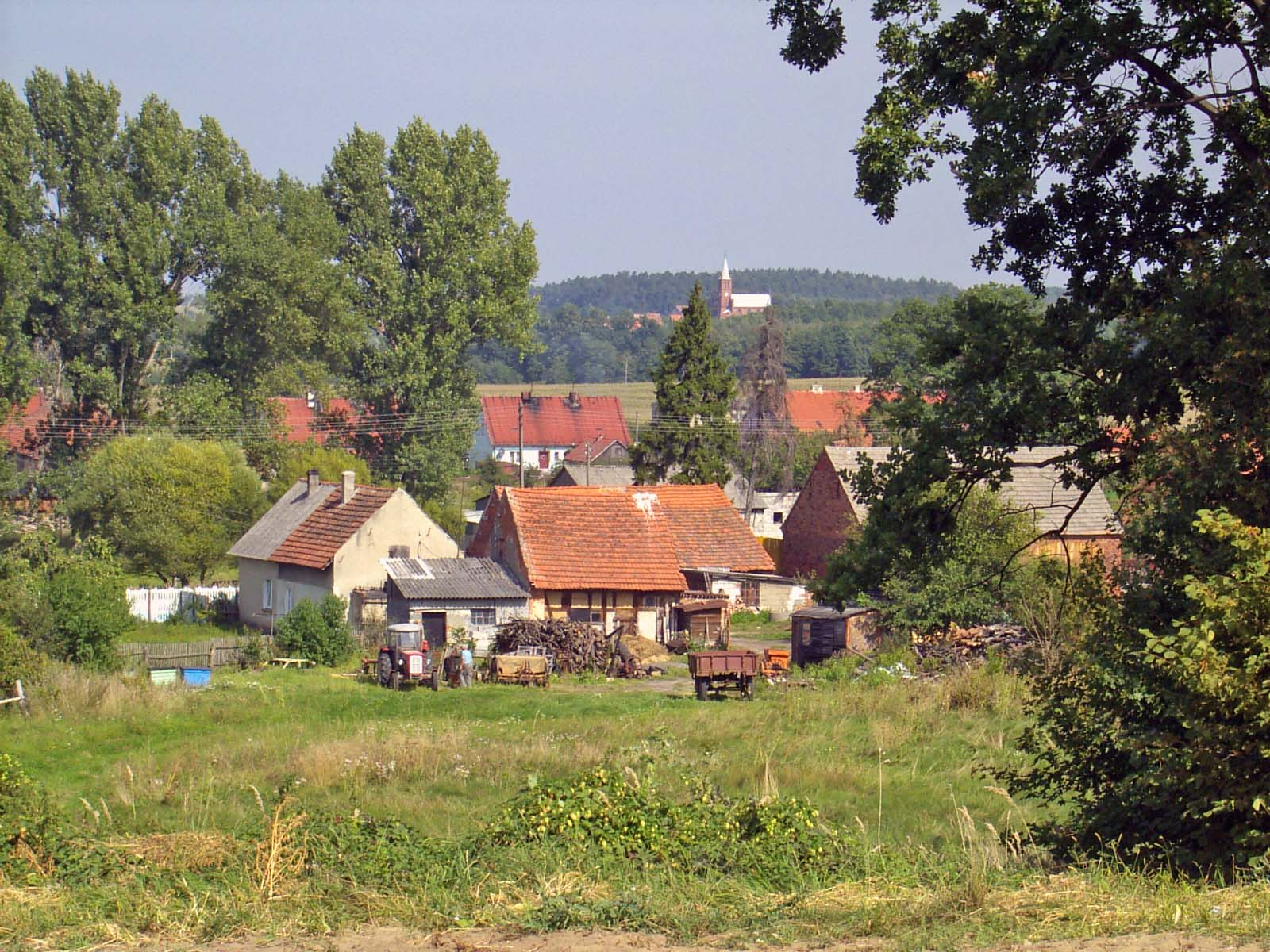

- Location within Poland
- Coordinates: 51°24′05″N 16°40′20″E
- Country: Poland
- Voivodeship: Lower Silesian
- County: Wołów
- Gmina: Wołów

Stęszów [ˈstɛ̃ʂuf] is a village in the administrative district of Gmina Wołów, within Wołów County, Lower Silesian Voivodeship, in south-western Poland.
