= Mojęcice =

- Village
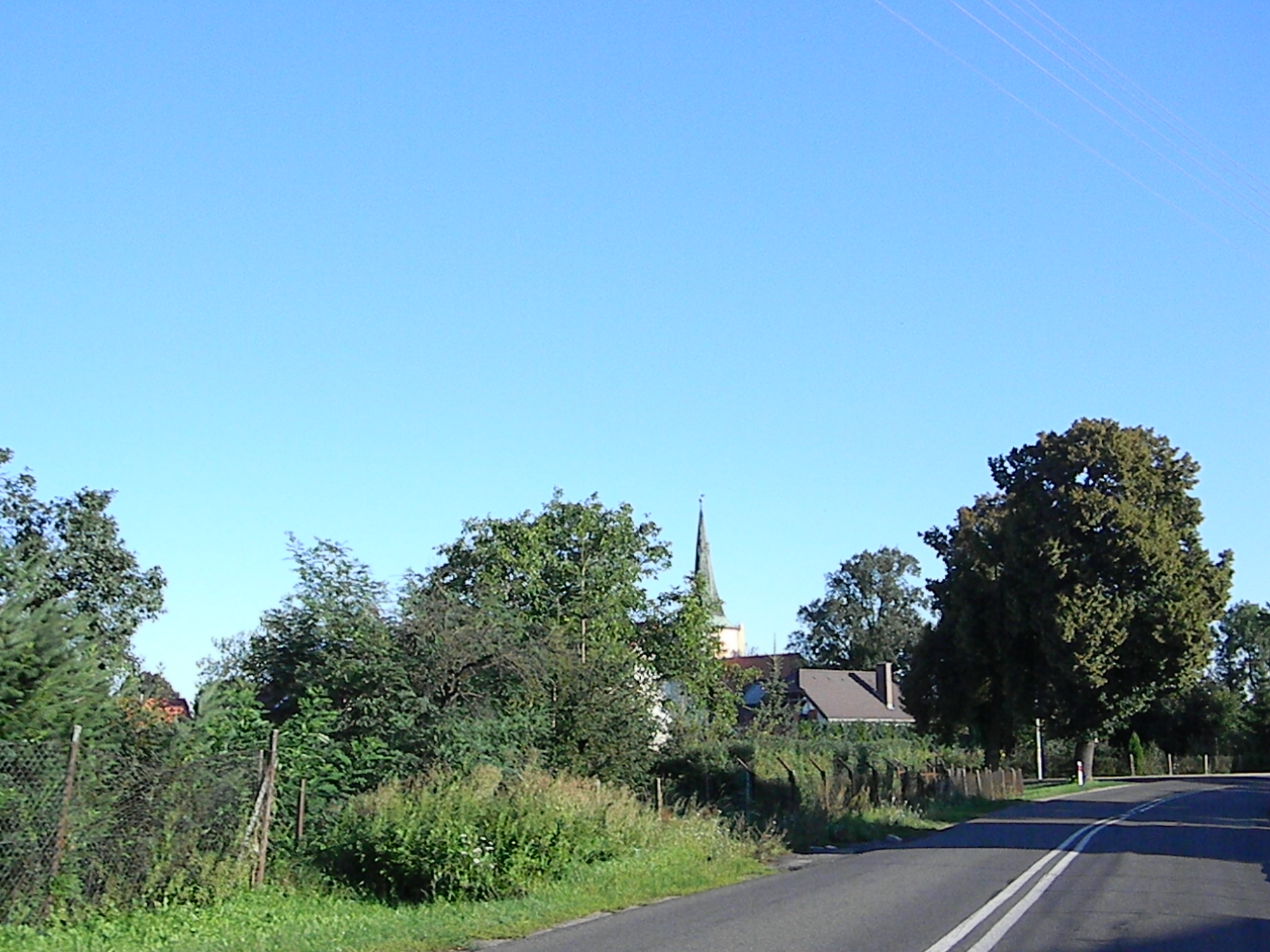

- Location within Poland
- Coordinates: 51°18′N 16°35′E
- Country: Poland
- Voivodeship: Lower Silesian
- County: Wołów
- Gmina: Wołów
- Population: 1,141

Mojęcice [mɔjɛnˈt͡ɕit͡sɛ] is a village in the administrative district of Gmina Wołów, within Wołów County, Lower Silesian Voivodeship, in south-western Poland.
