= Straża =

- Village
- Location within Poland
- Coordinates: 51°23′43″N 16°46′49″E
- Country: Poland
- Voivodeship: Lower Silesian
- County: Wołów
- Gmina: Wołów

Straża [ˈstraʐa] is a village in the administrative district of Gmina Wołów, within Wołów County, Lower Silesian Voivodeship, in south-western Poland.
