= Golina, Lower Silesian Voivodeship =

Golina
- Village
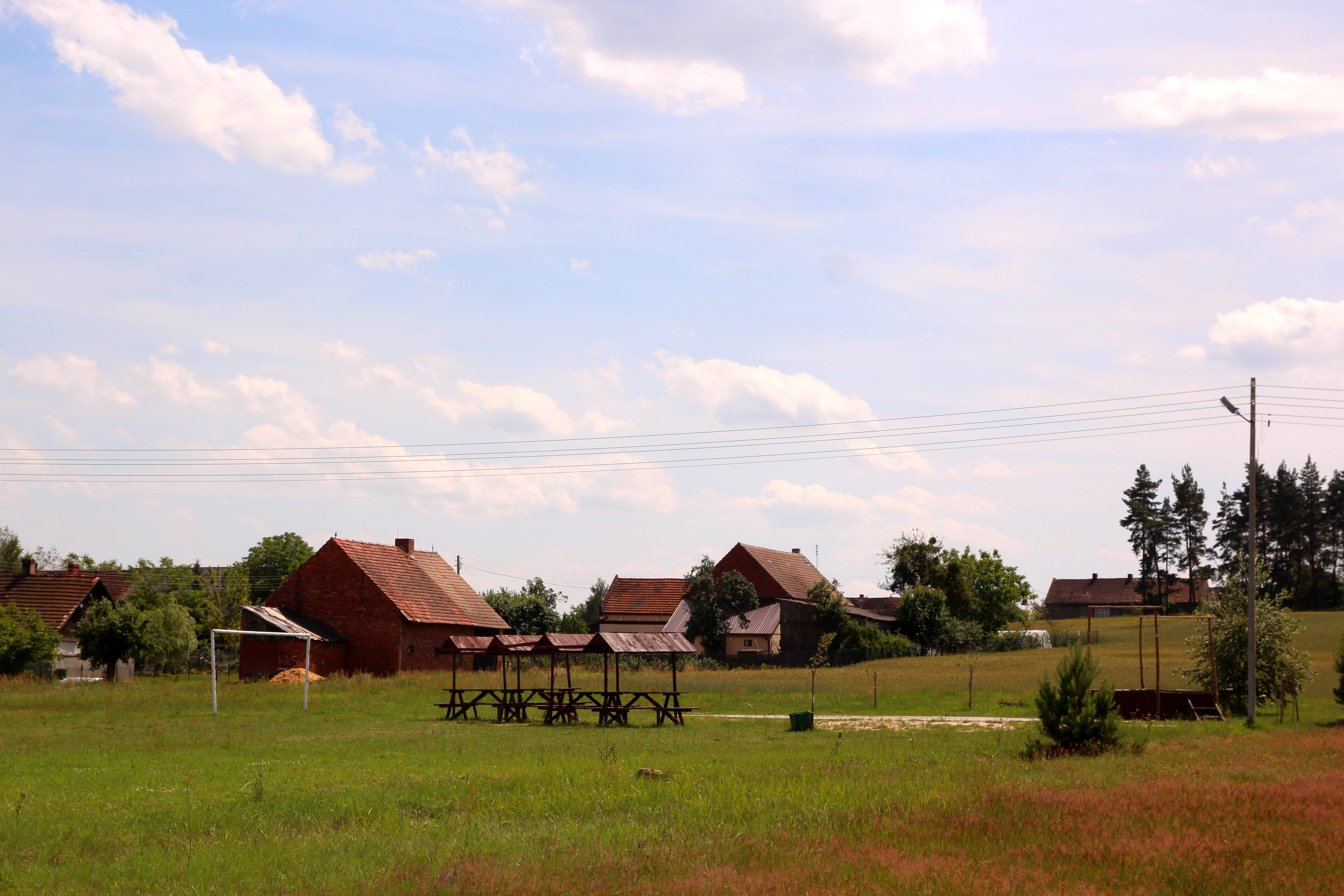

- Location within Poland
- Coordinates: 51°22′53″N 16°38′25″E
- Country: Poland
- Voivodeship: Lower Silesian
- County: Wołów
- Gmina: Wołów

Golina [ɡɔˈlina] is a village in the administrative district of Gmina Wołów, within Wołów County, Lower Silesian Voivodeship, in south-western Poland.

In April 2014, Polish historian Krzysztof Grochowski unearthed seven gravestones of Jews who lived there during World War II.
