= Małe Pułkowo =

- Village
- Location within Poland
- Coordinates: 53°13′N 19°3′E
- Country: Poland
- Voivodeship: Kuyavian-Pomeranian
- County: Wąbrzeźno
- Gmina: Dębowa Łąka

Małe Pułkowo [ˈmawɛ puu̯ˈkɔvɔ] is a village in the administrative district of Gmina Dębowa Łąka, within Wąbrzeźno County, Kuyavian-Pomeranian Voivodeship, in north-central Poland.
