= Niedźwiedź, Wąbrzeźno County =

Niedźwiedź
- Village
- Location within Poland
- Coordinates: 53°15′N 19°2′E
- Country: Poland
- Voivodeship: Kuyavian-Pomeranian
- County: Wąbrzeźno
- Gmina: Dębowa Łąka

Niedźwiedź [ˈɲɛd͡ʑvjɛt͡ɕ] is a village in the administrative district of Gmina Dębowa Łąka, within Wąbrzeźno County, Kuyavian-Pomeranian Voivodeship, in north-central Poland.
