= Prawików =

- Village
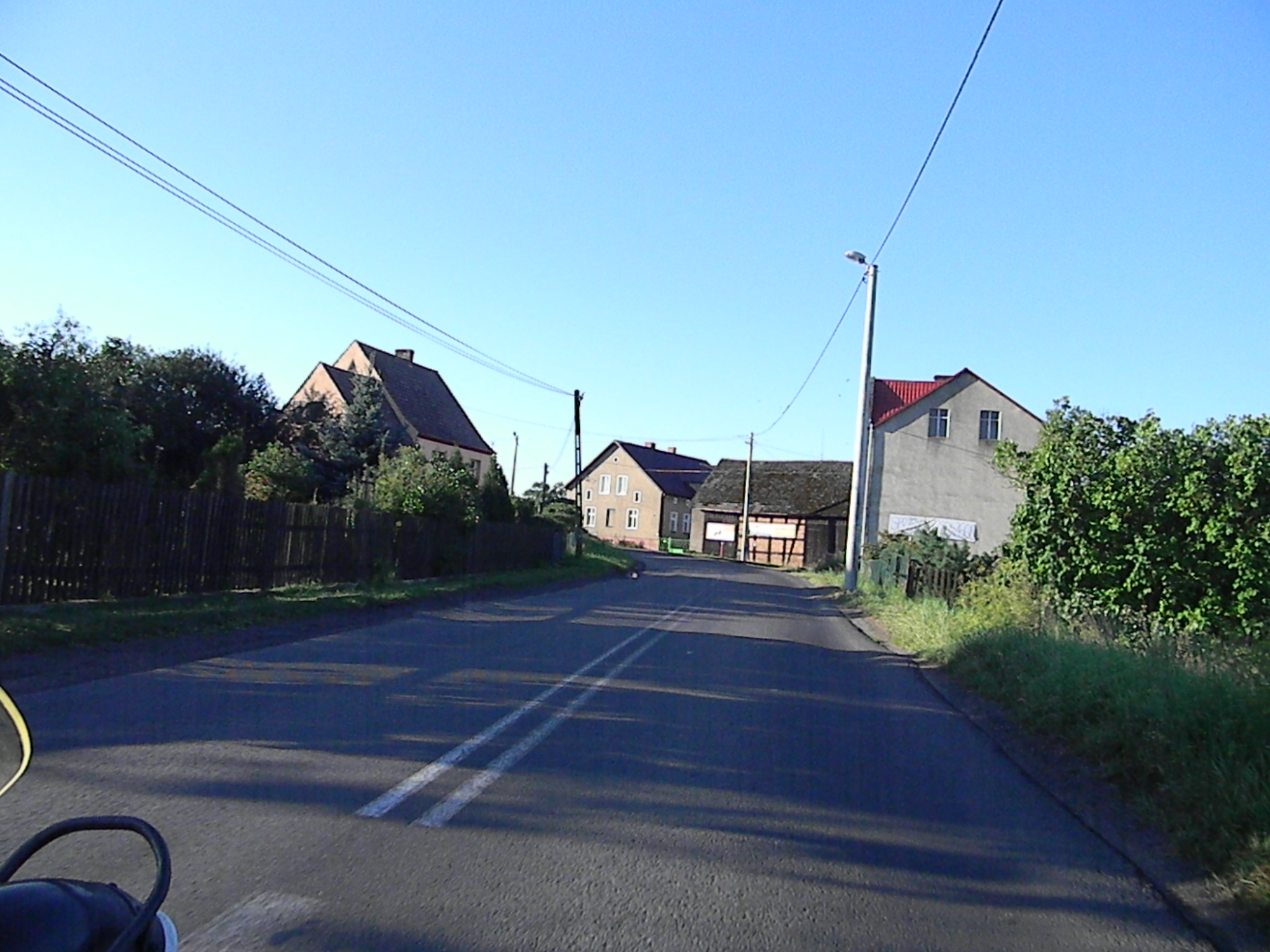

- Location within Poland
- Coordinates: 51°15′N 16°30′E
- Country: Poland
- Voivodeship: Lower Silesian
- County: Wołów
- Gmina: Wołów

Prawików [praˈvikuf] is a village in the administrative district of Gmina Wołów, within Wołów County, Lower Silesian Voivodeship, in south-western Poland.
