= Wrzosy, Lower Silesian Voivodeship =

Wrzosy
- Village
- Location within Poland
- Coordinates: 51°21′42″N 16°35′05″E
- Country: Poland
- Voivodeship: Lower Silesian
- County: Wołów
- Gmina: Wołów

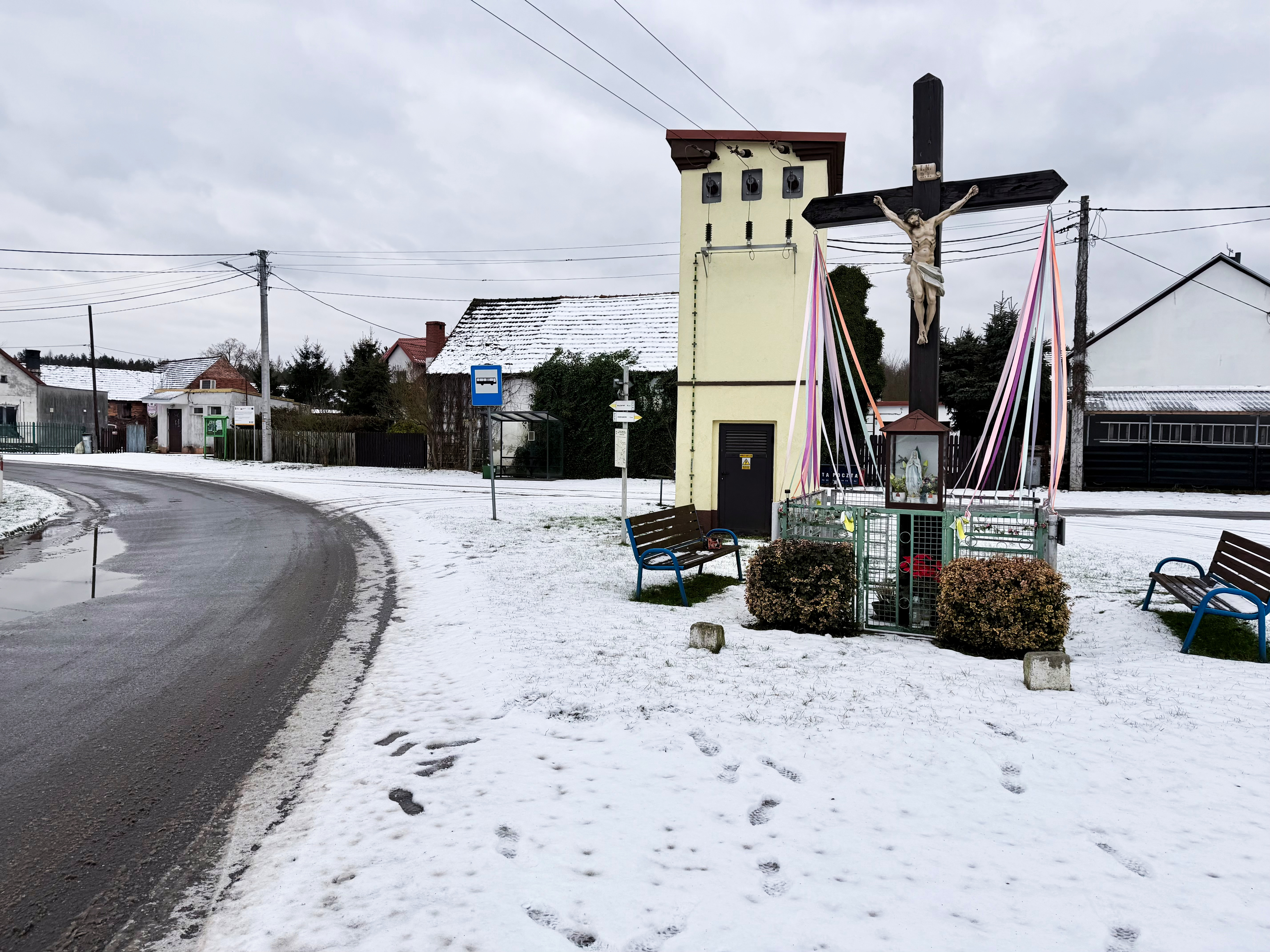
Wrzosy

Wrzosy [ˈvʐɔsɨ] is a village in the administrative district of Gmina Wołów, within Wołów County, Lower Silesian Voivodeship, in south-western Poland.
