= Krzydlina Mała =

- Village
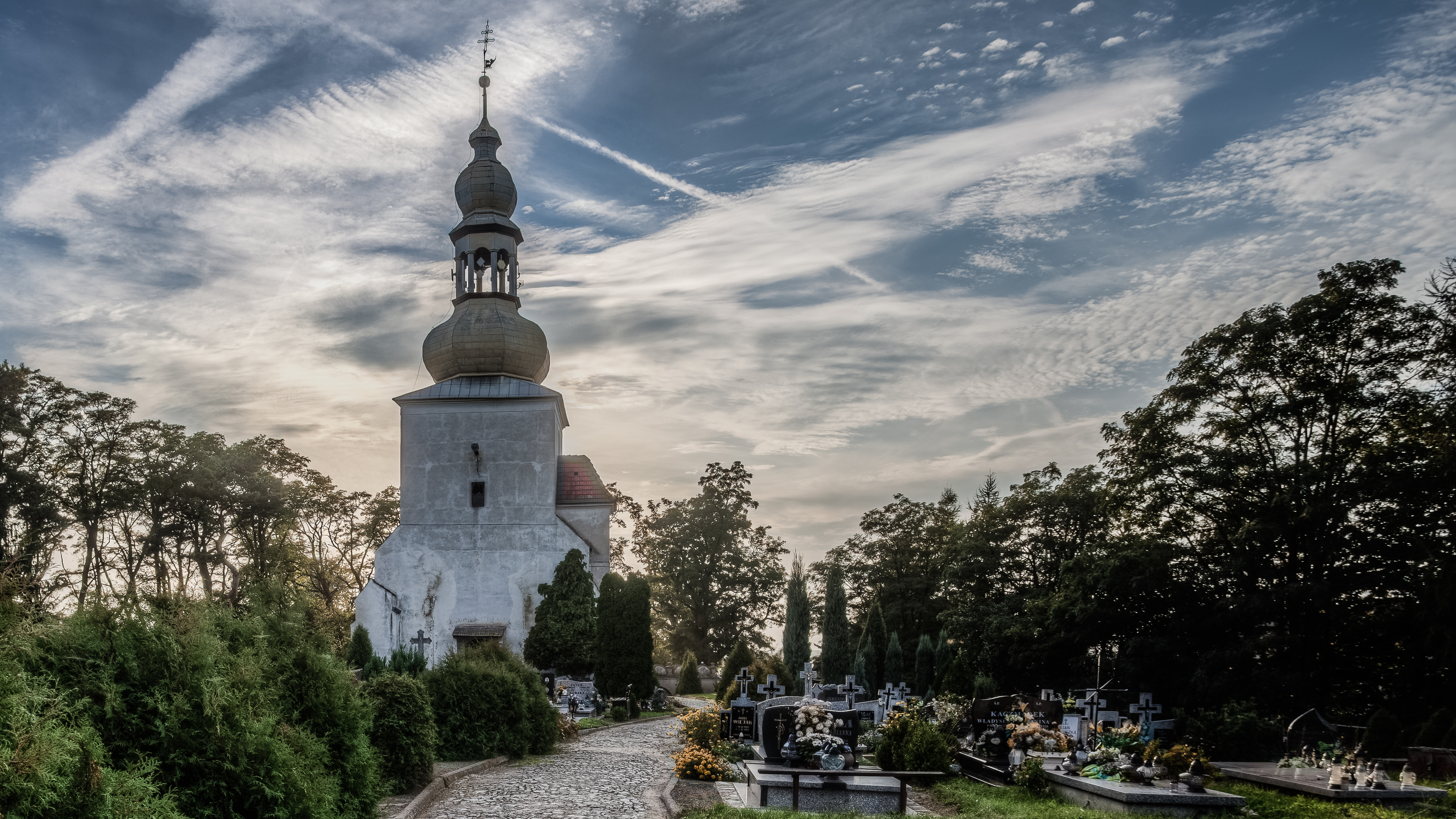
- Catholic church

- Location within Poland
- Coordinates: 51°18′N 16°32′E
- Country: Poland
- Voivodeship: Lower Silesian
- County: Wołów
- Gmina: Wołów

Krzydlina Mała [kʂɨˈdlina ˈmawa] is a village in the administrative district of Gmina Wołów, within Wołów County, Lower Silesian Voivodeship, in south-western Poland.
