= Zagórzyce, Lower Silesian Voivodeship =

Zagórzyce
- Village
- Location within Poland
- Coordinates: 51°16′9″N 16°32′35″E
- Country: Poland
- Voivodeship: Lower Silesian
- County: Wołów
- Gmina: Wołów
- First mentioned: 1175
- Time zone: UTC+1 (CET)
  - Summer (DST): UTC+2 (CEST)
- Vehicle registration: DWL

Zagórzyce [zaɡuˈʐɨt͡sɛ] is a village in the administrative district of Gmina Wołów, within Wołów County, Lower Silesian Voivodeship, in south-western Poland.

== History ==
The oldest known mention of the village come from a chronicle from 1175. In a document of Pope Innocent III issued in 1201 in Segni, the village was mentioned under the Latinized Polish name Zagorizs and confirmed as a possession of the monastery in nearby Lubiąż. In a document of Bishop of Wrocław Wawrzyniec issued in 1217, the village appeared as Zagorici. The name is of Polish origin and comes from the words za górami, which means "behind the hills". Since the Middle Ages, it was part of Piast-ruled Poland, and later on, it was also part of Bohemia (Czechia), Prussia and Germany. During World War II, it was the location of a forced labour subcamp of the Nazi German prison for youth in Wołów. In 1945, following Germany's defeat in World War II, the village became again part of Poland.
