= Piotroniowice =

- Village
- Location within Poland
- Coordinates: 51°19′N 16°39′E
- Country: Poland
- Voivodeship: Lower Silesian
- County: Wołów
- Gmina: Wołów
- Population: 161

Piotroniowice [pjɔtrɔɲɔˈvit͡sɛ] is a village in the administrative district of Gmina Wołów, within Wołów County, Lower Silesian Voivodeship, in south-western Poland. The earliest mention concerning Piotroniowice dates from the 13th century. It was burned by the Hussites in 1431. It was also damaged during the Thirty Years' War several times. Piotroniowice in 1939 had a population of 250.
