= Wielkie Radowiska =

- Village
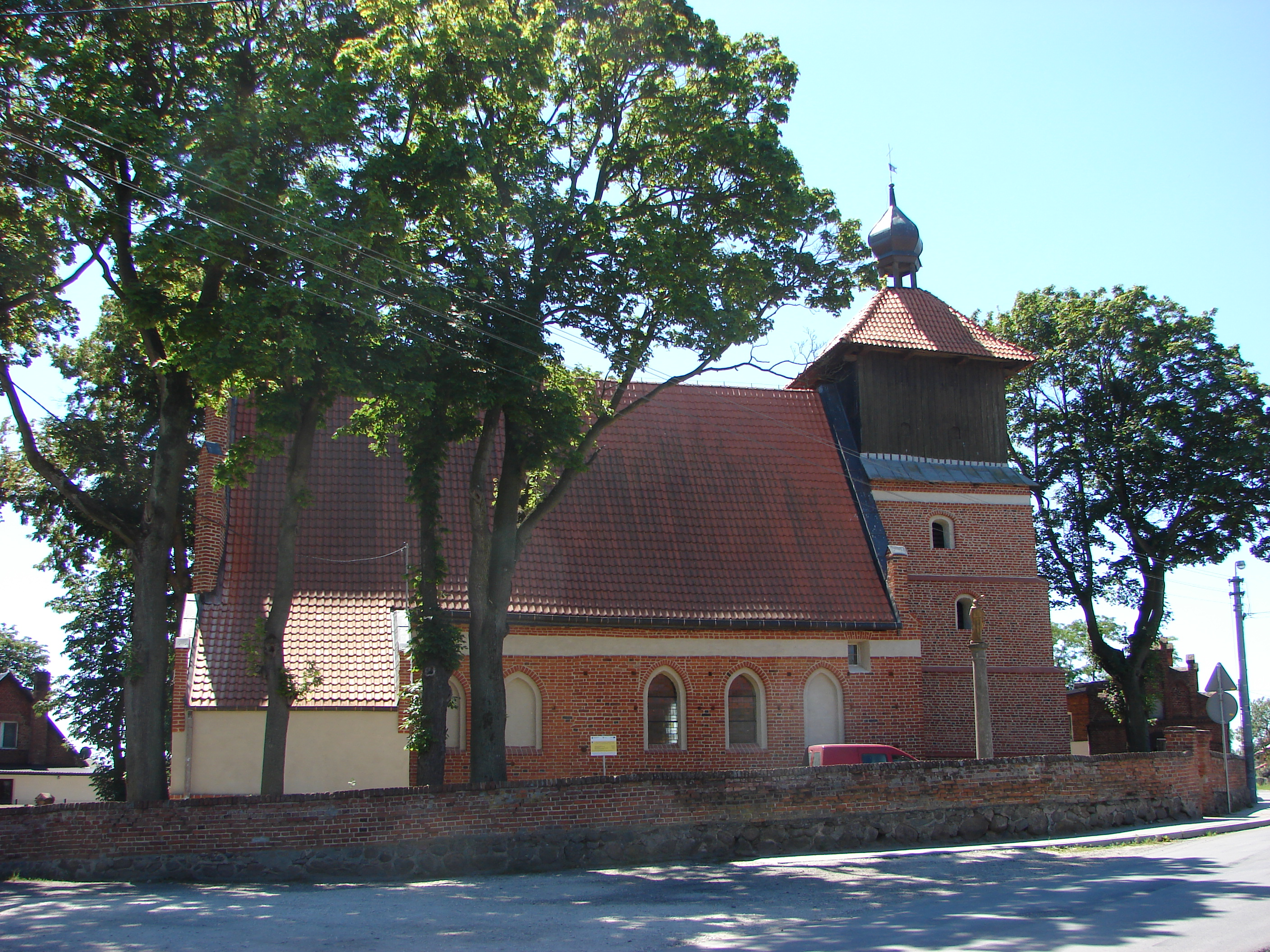
- Parish church of St. James, 14th century.

- Location within Poland
- Coordinates: 53°13′N 19°1′E
- Country: Poland
- Voivodeship: Kuyavian-Pomeranian
- County: Wąbrzeźno
- Gmina: Dębowa Łąka

Wielkie Radowiska [ˈvjɛlkʲɛ radɔˈviska] is a village in the administrative district of Gmina Dębowa Łąka, within Wąbrzeźno County, Kuyavian-Pomeranian Voivodeship, in north-central Poland.
