= Rataje, Lower Silesian Voivodeship =

Rataje
- Village
- Location within Poland
- Coordinates: 51°16′12″N 16°31′27″E
- Country: Poland
- Voivodeship: Lower Silesian
- County: Wołów
- Gmina: Wołów
- Time zone: UTC+1 (CET)
  - Summer (DST): UTC+2 (CEST)
- Vehicle registration: DWL

Rataje [raˈtajɛ] is a village in the administrative district of Gmina Wołów, within Wołów County, Lower Silesian Voivodeship, in south-western Poland.

== Name ==
In a document of Pope Innocent III issued in 1201 in Segni, the village was mentioned under the Latinized Polish name Radtaj and confirmed as a possession of the monastery in nearby Lubiąż. In a document of Bishop of Wrocław Wawrzyniec issued in 1217, the village appeared as Rataie. The name is of Polish origin and there are several villages of the same name throughout Poland.
