= Warzęgowo =

- Village
- Location within Poland
- Coordinates: 51°24′4″N 16°44′19″E
- Country: Poland
- Voivodeship: Lower Silesian
- County: Wołów
- Gmina: Wołów

Warzęgowo [vaʐɛŋˈɡɔvɔ] is a village in the administrative district of Gmina Wołów, within Wołów County, Lower Silesian Voivodeship, in south-western Poland.
