= Lipnica, Kuyavian-Pomeranian Voivodeship =

Lipnica
- Village
- Location within Poland
- Coordinates: 53°11′19″N 19°2′36″E
- Country: Poland
- Voivodeship: Kuyavian-Pomeranian
- County: Wąbrzeźno
- Gmina: Dębowa Łąka
- Population: 390

Lipnica (Polish pronunciation: [lipˈɲit͡sa]) is a village in the administrative district of Gmina Dębowa Łąka, within Wąbrzeźno County, Kuyavian-Pomeranian Voivodeship, in north-central Poland.
