= Kozarnika, Botevgrad Municipality =

Cave in Bulgaria

Kozarnika
- Козарника (Bulgarian)
- location in Bulgaria
- 43°00′40.96″N 23°43′41.14″E
- Location: near Lipnitsa village, Botevgrad municipality
- Region: Sofia Province, Bulgaria

Site notes
- Length: 89 m (292 ft)

Kozarnika (Bulgarian: Козарника) is a cave in the western Balkan Mountains of Bulgaria. It is located near the village of Lipnitsa, Botevgrad municipality, 600 m from Preslavica neighbourhood. In Bulgarian Kozarnika means "goat pen" and the cave was given this name by local people, who had hidden there their goats in the past.

The cave's entrance is 4.5 m wide and 2.5 m high. Its total length is 89 m. The cave has no waterways, it is easily passable and contains with a single winding gallery with one branch that stems from the main gallery. The first 15 m of the gallery are high and wide but then it gets narrower and lower. There is a 14-meter high chimney.

There are many cave formations, such as stalactites, stalagnates, stalagmites, dendrites, sinters, dulles, cave pearls and chelates. The predominant colours are white and pink. The fauna includes invertebrate trogophiles and trogloxene. Bones of cave animals and ceramics have been discovered in the cave.

Kozarnika was mapped in 1966 by Cv. Nikolov, G. Dimitrov, V. Tuevski and G. Raynovski.
