= Lipnica, Wołów County =

Lipnica
- Village
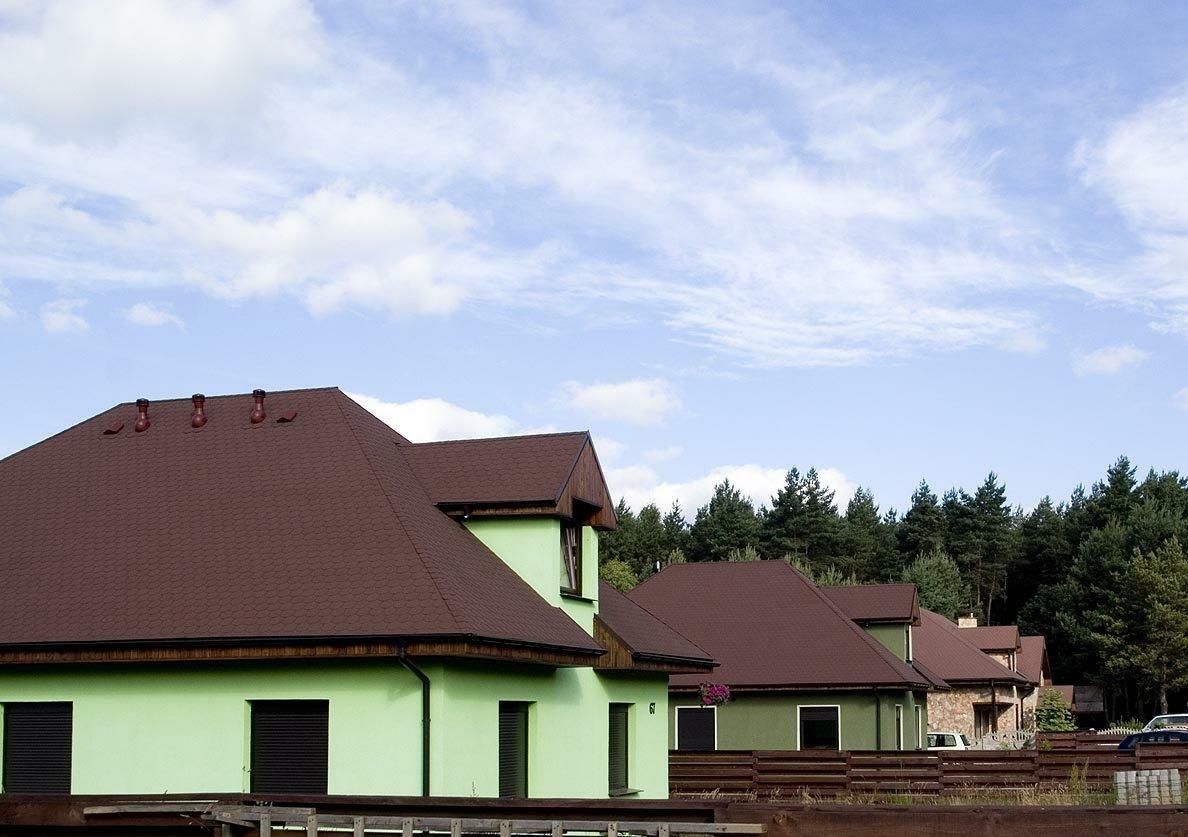

- Location within Poland
- Coordinates: 51°18′42″N 16°41′46″E
- Country: Poland
- Voivodeship: Lower Silesian
- County: Wołów
- Gmina: Wołów

Lipnica (Polish pronunciation: [lipˈɲit͡sa]) is a village in the administrative district of Gmina Wołów, within Wołów County, Lower Silesian Voivodeship, in south-western Poland.
