= Lipnica, Tuzla =

Village in Bosnia and Herzegovina

Lipnica
- Village
- Location within Bosnia and Herzegovina
- Coordinates: 44.5669189°N 18.6003908°E
- Country: Bosnia and Herzegovina
- Entity: Federation of Bosnia and Herzegovina
- Canton: Tuzla
- Municipality: Tuzla

Area
  - Total: 1.68 sq mi (4.35 km^{2})

Population (2013)
  - Total: 1,029
  - Density: 613/sq mi (237/km^{2})
- Time zone: UTC+1 (CET)
  - Summer (DST): UTC+2 (CEST)
- Postal code: 75000
- Area code: 075

Lipnica is a village in the municipality of Tuzla, Tuzla Canton, Bosnia and Herzegovina.

== Demographics ==
According to the 2013 census, its population was 1,029.

Ethnicity in 2013
Ethnicity	Number	Percentage
Bosniaks	809	78.6%
Croats	148	14.4%
Serbs	9	0.9%
other/undeclared	63	6.1%
Total	1,029	100%
