= Gliniany, Lower Silesian Voivodeship =

Gliniany
- Village
- Location within Poland
- Coordinates: 51°17′58″N 16°26′40″E
- Country: Poland
- Voivodeship: Lower Silesian
- County: Wołów
- Gmina: Wołów

Gliniany [ɡliˈɲanɨ] is a village in the administrative district of Gmina Wołów, within Wołów County, Lower Silesian Voivodeship, in south-western Poland.
