= Lipnitsa, Platavsky selsovet, Konyshyovsky District, Kursk Oblast =

Rural locality in Kursk Oblast, Russia

Lipnitsa Липница
- Khutor
- Interactive map of Lipnitsa
- Location of Lipnitsa Lipnitsa (Kursk Oblast)
- Coordinates: 51°46′58″N 34°59′47″E
- Country: Russia
- Federal subject: Kursk Oblast
- Administrative district: Konyshyovsky District
- SelsovietSelsoviet: Platavsky

Population (2010 Census)
  - Total: 3
  - Estimate (2010): 3 (0%)

Municipal status
  - Municipal district: Konyshyovsky Municipal District
  - Rural settlement: Platavsky Selsoviet Rural Settlement
- Time zone: UTC+3 (MSK)
- Postal code: 307635
- Dialing code: +7 47156
- OKTMO ID: 38616436146
- Website: platavskii.ru

Lipnitsa (Russian: Липница) is a rural locality (a khutor) in Platavsky Selsoviet Rural Settlement, Konyshyovsky District, Kursk Oblast, Russia. Population: 3 (2010 census); 7 (2002 census);

== Geography ==
The khutor is located on the Platavka River (a left tributary of the Svapa River), 38.5 km from the Russia–Ukraine border, 82 km west of Kursk, 21 km south-west of the district center – the urban-type settlement Konyshyovka, 9 km from the selsoviet center – Kashara.

Climate

Lipnitsa has a warm-summer humid continental climate (Dfb in the Köppen climate classification).

== Transport ==
Lipnitsa is located 38.5 km from the federal route M-3 Ukraine Highway, 66 km from the route M-2 Crimea Highway, 33.5 km from the route A-142 (Trosna – M3 highway), 33 km from the road of regional importance 38K-038 (Fatezh – Dmitriyev), 21 km from the road 38K-005 (Konyshyovka – Zhigayevo – 38K-038), 18 km from the road 38K-017 (Kursk – Lgov – Rylsk – border with Ukraine), 16 km from the road 38K-023 (Lgov – Konyshyovka), 3.5 km from the road of intermunicipal significance 38H-162 (Korobkino – summer camp), 18 km from the nearest railway halt Maritsa (railway line Navlya – Lgov-Kiyevsky).

The rural locality is situated 89 km from Kursk Vostochny Airport, 167 km from Belgorod International Airport and 292 km from Voronezh Peter the Great Airport.
