= Domaszków, Wołów County =

Domaszków
- Village
- Location within Poland
- Coordinates: 51°19′0″N 16°28′11″E
- Country: Poland
- Voivodeship: Lower Silesian
- County: Wołów
- Gmina: Wołów
- Population (approx.): 280

Domaszków [dɔˈmaʂkuf] is a village in the administrative district of Gmina Wołów, within Wołów County, Lower Silesian Voivodeship, in south-western Poland.
