= Magistrates Building =

Cultural monument in Zemun, Belgrade, Serbia

Coordinates: 44.8443°N 20.4133°E

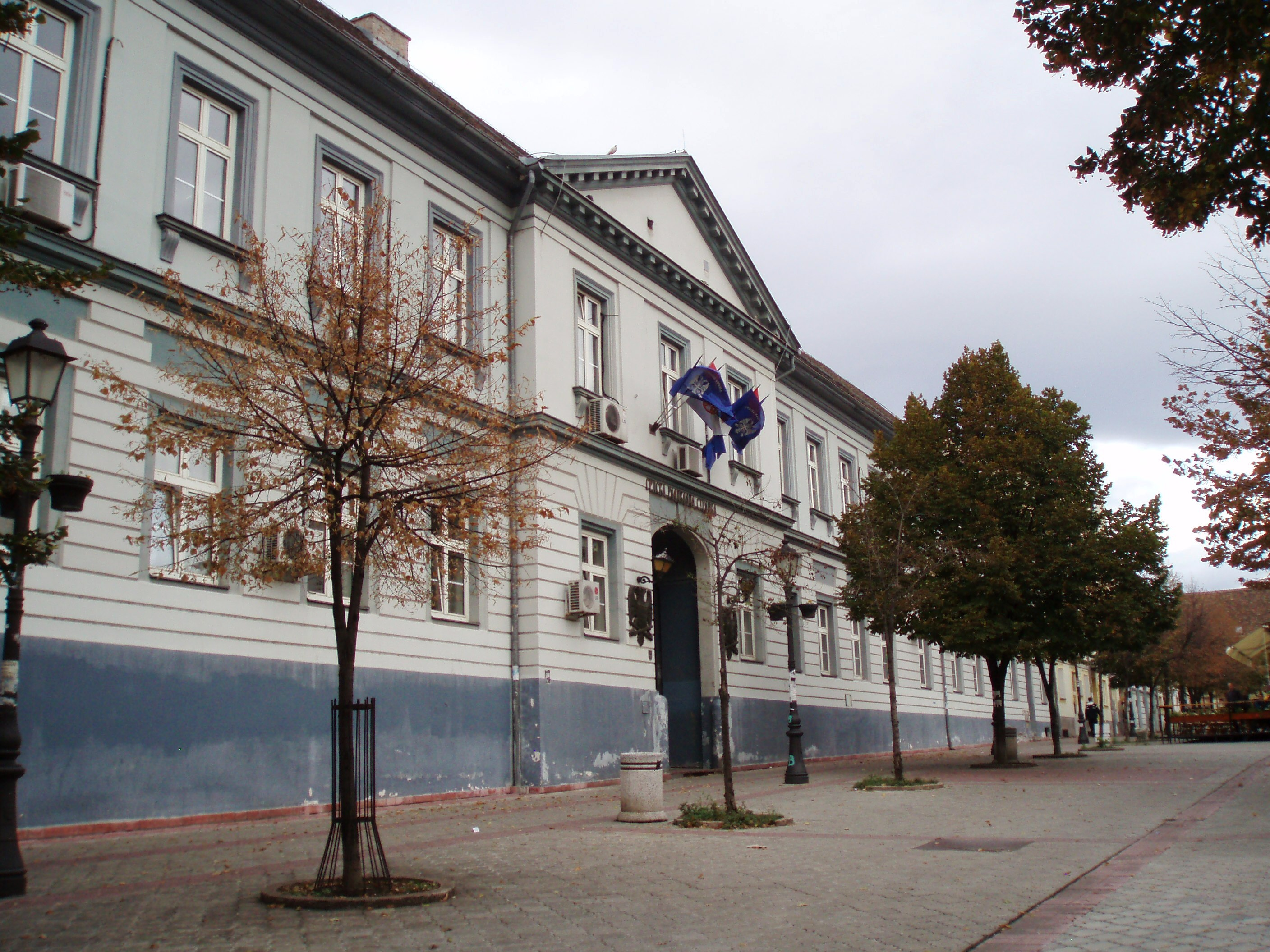

The Мagistrates Building in Zemun, Belgrade, is at 3 Magistrate Square and is classified by the government as a cultural monument. The building is the purest example of classicism in the architecture of the Old Core of Zemun and a symbol of the development of the Zemun municipal administration since 1751.

== History ==
The building was established in 1751 in Zemun, and in 1755 the town got its first town hall. It was a one-floor Baroque building with an attic, which served as a magistrate building until 1832, after which magistrate officials lived there. The building was burned in a fire in 1867. From 1823 to 1832 a new classicist magistrate building was built after the designs of Zemun architect Joseph Felber. The building was constructed from hard materials, with mezzanine arched baroque structures in the ground floor and architrave structures on the upper floor.

== Description ==
The building was symmetrical, with a shallow central projection ending in a tympanum. It has a basement, a ground floor and an upper floor. The arrangement of the rooms in two-pronged scheme was derived from the organization of the Magistrate into several official departments.

In 1836, according to the designs signed by the city clerk Križanić, the building was enlarged into the site of the former house of Miloš Urošević. The new part changed the purity of the classical concept, despite the fact that the construction and structural elements of the older part of the building were repeated consistently. Zemun Magistrate was situated in the new building until 1871, when it was handed over for the use of the Court, which stayed there for many years. Since 1997, the building is the seat of the Serbian Radical Party. The public character of the Magistrate building is still maintained as it is home to the Zemun library, founded in 1825, and the Zemun Gallery.

== See also ==
- Donji Grad, Zemun
