= TV Palma Plus =

- Type: Terrestrial television
- Country: Serbia
- Availability: Local (Jagodina and countries of former Yugoslavia)
- TV transmitters: Jagodina and Belgrade
- Key people: Dragan Marković
- Launch date: July 1997
- Official website: Site:, YT channel:

TV Palma Plus (Serbian: ТВ Палма Плус) was a privately owned Serbian television station based in Jagodina.
