= Wodnica, Lower Silesian Voivodeship =

Wodnica
- Village
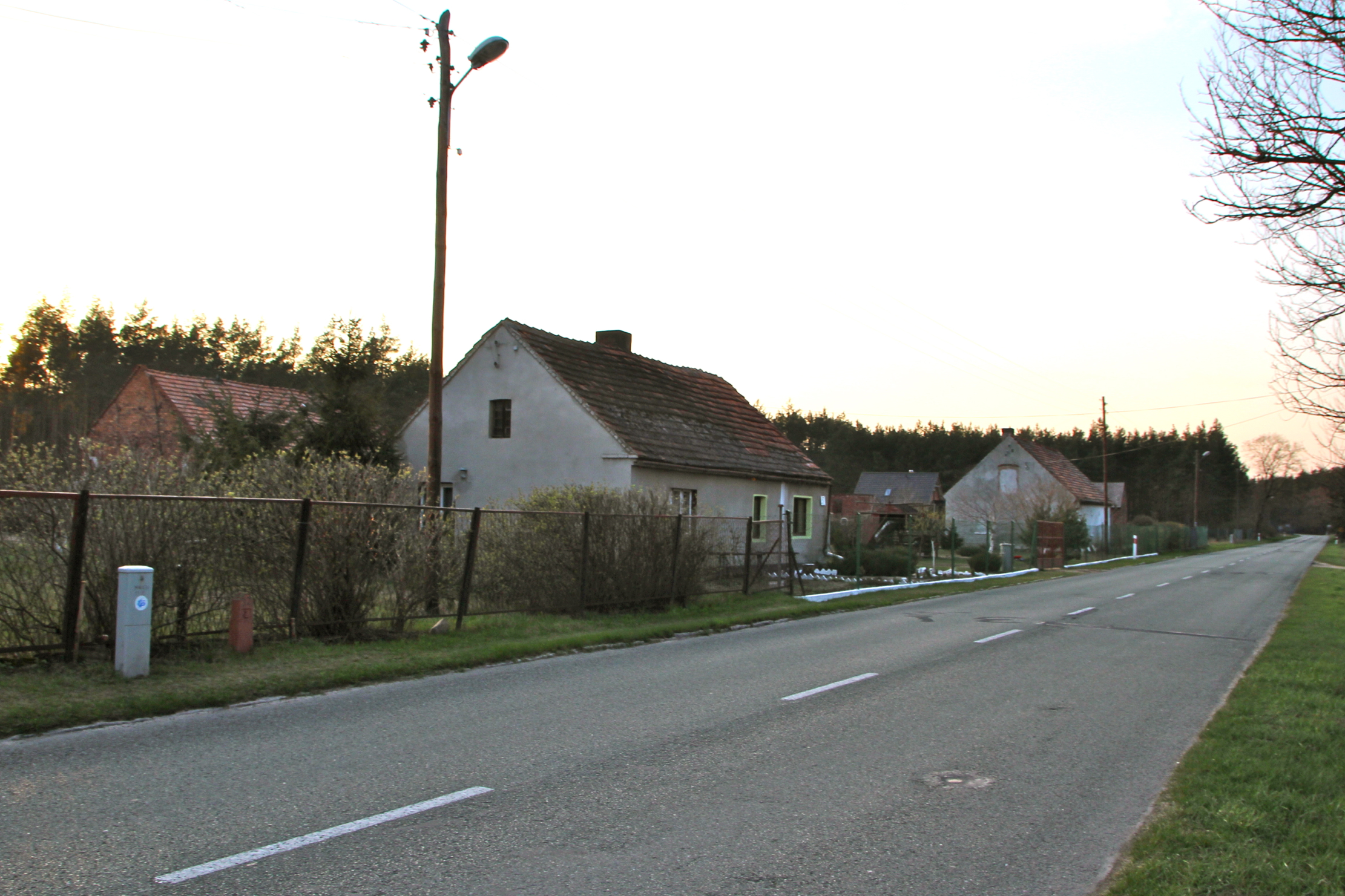
- Wodnica (2012)

- Location within Poland
- Coordinates: 51°22′15″N 16°30′54″E
- Country: Poland
- Voivodeship: Lower Silesian
- County: Wołów
- Gmina: Wołów
- Population: 70

Wodnica [vɔdˈnit͡sa] is a village in the administrative district of Gmina Wołów, within Wołów County, Lower Silesian Voivodeship, in south-western Poland.
