= Gmina Wołów =

Gmina Wołów Wołów Commune
- Gmina
- Flag Coat of arms
- Interactive map of Gmina Wołów
- Coordinates (Wołów): 51°20′29″N 16°37′42″E
- Country: Poland
- Voivodeship: Lower Silesian
- County: Wołów
- Seat: Wołów

Area
  - Total: 331.06 km^{2} (127.82 sq mi)

Population (2019-06-30)
  - Total: 22,443
  - Density: 67.791/km^{2} (175.58/sq mi)
  - Urban: 12,373
  - Rural: 10,070
- Website: http://www.wolow.pl

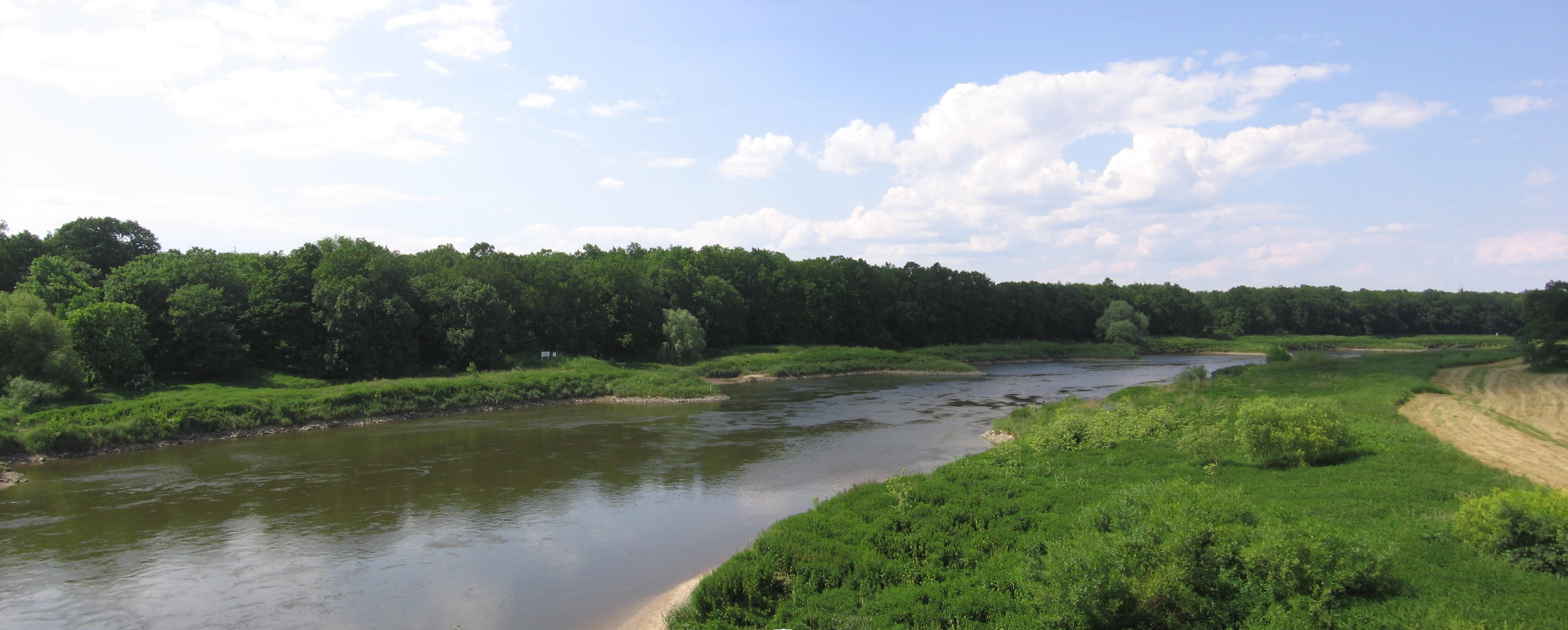
Wołów

Gmina Wołów is an urban-rural gmina (administrative district) in Wołów County, Lower Silesian Voivodeship, in south-western Poland. Its seat is the town of Wołów, which lies approximately 38 kilometres (24 mi) north-west of the regional capital Wrocław. It is part of the Wrocław metropolitan area.

The gmina covers an area of 331.06 square kilometres (127.8 sq mi), and as of 2019 its total population was 22,443.

== Neighbouring gminas ==
Gmina Wołów is bordered by the gminas of Brzeg Dolny, Malczyce, Oborniki Śląskie, Prochowice, Prusice, Ścinawa, Środa Śląska and Wińsko.

== Villages ==
Apart from the town of Wołów, the gmina contains the 47 villages of Biskupice, Boraszyn, Bożeń, Dębno, Domaszków, Garwół, Gliniany, Golina, Gródek, Kąty, Kłopotówka, Kretowice, Krzydlina Mała, Krzydlina Wielka, Łazarzowice, Lipnica, Łososiowice, Lubiąż, Mikorzyce, Miłcz, Moczydlnica Dworska, Mojęcice, Nieszkowice, Pawłoszewo, Pełczyn, Piotroniowice, Prawików, Proszkowa, Rataje, Rudno, Siodłkowice, Sławowice, Smarków, Stary Wołów, Stęszów, Stobno, Straszowice, Straża, Tarchalice, Uskorz Mały, Uskorz Wielki, Warzęgowo, Wodnica, Wróblewo, Wrzosy, Zagórzyce and Żychlin.

== Twin towns – sister cities ==
Gmina Wołów is twinned with:

- Buchholz in der Nordheide, Germany
- Canteleu, France
- Milovice, Czech Republic
