= Lipnica (Knić) =

Lipnica Липница
- Village
- Interactive map of Lipnica
- Coordinates: 43°54′44″N 20°48′26″E
- Country: Serbia
- District: Šumadija
- Municipality: Knić

Area
  - Total: 14.41 km^{2} (5.56 sq mi)
- Elevation: 374 m (1,227 ft)

Population (2011)
  - Total: 459
  - Density: 31.9/km^{2} (82.5/sq mi)
- Time zone: UTC+1 (CET)
  - Summer (DST): UTC+2 (CEST)

Lipnica (Serbian Cyrillic: Липница) is a village located in the municipality of Knić, central Serbia. As of 2011 census, it has a population of 459 inhabitants.
