= Lipnița =

- Commune
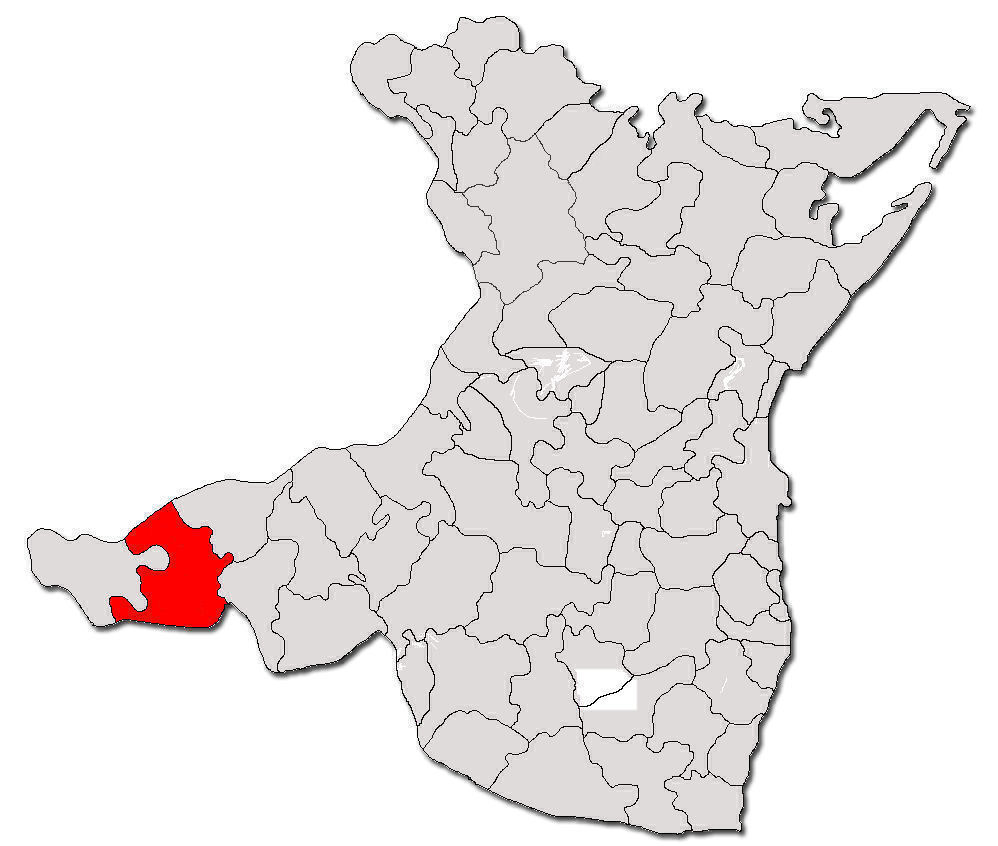
- Location in Constanța County

- Location in Romania
- Coordinates: 44°06′N 27°36′E
- Country: Romania
- County: Constanța
- Subdivisions: Lipnița, Canlia, Carvan, Coșlugea, Cuiugiuc, Goruni, Izvoarele

Government
  - Mayor (2020–2024): Nicolae-Florin Dinu (PNL)
- Area: 180.06 km^{2} (69.52 sq mi)
- Population (2021-12-01): 2,876
  - Density: 15.97/km^{2} (41.37/sq mi)
- Time zone: UTC+02:00 (EET)
  - Summer (DST): UTC+03:00 (EEST)
- Vehicle reg.: CT
- Website: www.primaria-lipnita.ro

Lipnița (Romanian pronunciation: [ˈlipnit͡sa]) is a commune in Constanța County, Northern Dobruja, Romania.

The commune includes seven villages:

- Lipnița
- Canlia (historical name: Turkish: Kanlı)
- Carvăn (historical names: Kervan) - established in 1968 from the merger of Carvănu Mare (historical name:Carvan de Sus, Turkish: Yukarı Kervan) and Carvănu Mic (historical name: Carvan de Jos, Turkish: Aşağı Kervan)
- Coșlugea (Turkish: Kozluca)
- Cuiugiuc (Turkish: Kuyucuk)
- Goruni (historical name: Velichioi until 1968, Turkish: Veli-Köy)
- Izvoarele (historical name: Pârjoaia until 1968)

In October 2017, a border crossing was inaugurated in Lipnița, linking it with the neighbouring commune of Kaynardzha in Bulgaria.

== Demographics ==
At the 2011 census, Lipnița had 2,764 Romanians (87.2%), 39 Roma (1.2%), 210 Turks (6.6%).
