= Białków =

Białków may refer to the following places in Poland:

- Białków, Gmina Miękinia, in Środa County, Lower Silesian Voivodeship (south-west Poland)
- Białków, Wołów County in Lower Silesian Voivodeship (south-west Poland)
- Białków, Słubice County in Lubusz Voivodeship (west Poland)
- Białków, Żary County in Lubusz Voivodeship (west Poland)
