= Kashveti Church =

Church building in Tbilisi, Georgia

- ქაშვეთის ტაძარი
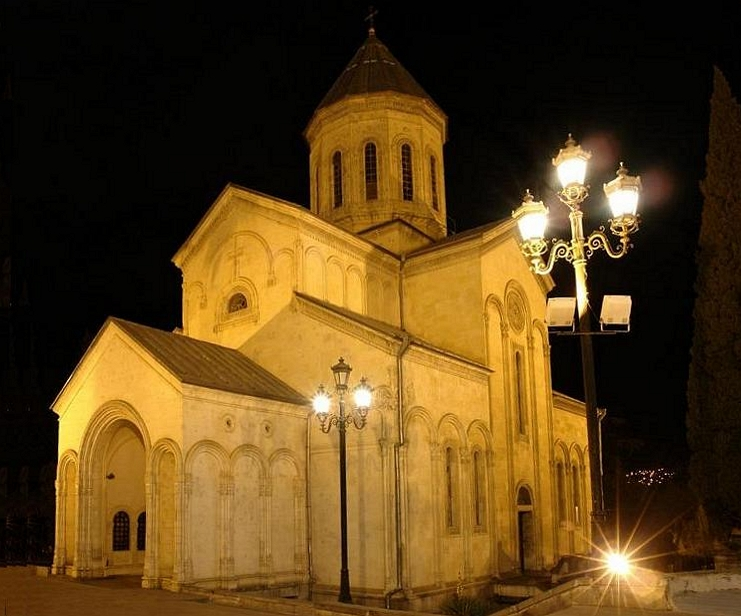

- Location within Tbilisi Location within Georgia

Religion
- Affiliation: Georgian Orthodox Church

Location
- Location: 9, Rustaveli Avenue, Tbilisi, (Georgia (country)) Georgia
- Interactive map of Kashveti Church
- Coordinates: 41.697954°N 44.799324°E

Architecture
- Architect: L. Bilfeldt
- Type: Church
- Style: Georgian Cross-Dome
- Completed: 1910; 116 years ago
- Materials: stone

Website
- www.kvashveti.ge

Cultural Heritage Monument of Georgia
- Official name: Kashueti Church
- Designated: October 1, 2007; 18 years ago
- Reference no.: 643
- Item Number in Cultural Heritage Portal: 4229
- Date of entry in the registry: October 11, 2007; 18 years ago

The Kashveti Church of St. George (Georgian: ქაშვეთის წმინდა გიორგის სახელობის ტაძარი) is a Georgian Orthodox Church in central Tbilisi, located across from the Parliament building on Rustaveli Avenue.

The Kashveti church was constructed between 1904 and 1910 by the architect Leopold Bilfeldt, who based his design on the medieval Samtavisi Cathedral. The construction was sponsored by the Georgian nobility and bourgeoisie. Kashveti was built on the site of a damaged church built of brick at the request of the Amilakhvari family in 1753. Significant contributions to the current church's ornate design were made by N. Agladze. Kashveti's frescoes were painted by the influential Georgian painter, Lado Gudiashvili, in 1947.

The name "kashveti" is derived from Georgian words kva for a "stone" and shva "to give birth." Legend has it the prominent 6th century monk David of Gareja of the Thirteen Assyrian Fathers was accused by a woman of making her a pregnant in Tbilisi. David prophesied his denial would be proved when she gave birth to a stone. She did, and the place received the name of "kashveti".

== Burials ==
- Ivane Amilakhvari
- Grigol Orbeliani
- David Sarajishvili
