= Julius Weise =

German entomologist (1844–1925)

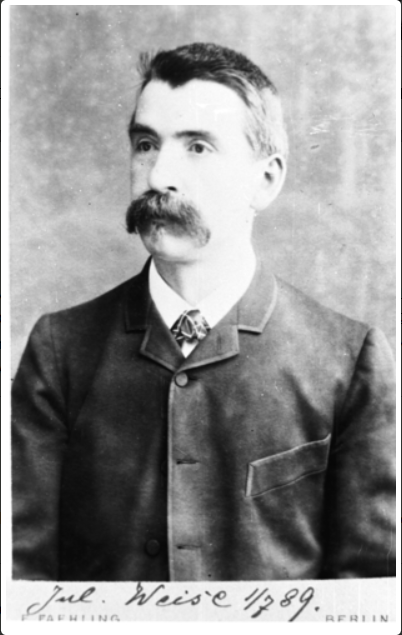
- Julius Weise in 1889.
- Born: 6 June 1844; Sommerfeld
- Died: 25 February 1925 (aged 80); Herichsdorf, near Warmbrunn
- Occupation: entomologist

Julius Weise (6 June 1844 – 25 February 1925) was a German entomologist. He specialised in Coleoptera, especially Chrysomelidae and Coccinellidae, and was one of the first entomologists to use genitalia to identify and classify species.

His collections of Chrysomelidae, Coccinellidae, Staphylinidae and Carabidae are in the Museum für Naturkunde in Berlin, and his collections of Cerambycidae and Coccinellidae are in the National Museum of Natural History, Washington, D.C. Collections of Curculionidae and the Scolytidae are in Senckenberg Museum in Frankfurt, while his collections of Chrysomelidae and the Coccinellidae can be found in the Swedish Museum of Natural History at Stockholm.
