= Lutol =

- Village
- Location within Poland
- Coordinates: 51°48′55″N 15°0′31″E
- Country: Poland
- Voivodeship: Lubusz
- County: Żary
- Gmina: Lubsko
- Population: 259

Lutol [ˈlutɔl] is a village in the administrative district of Gmina Lubsko, within Żary County, Lubusz Voivodeship, in western Poland.
