= Eduard Vogel von Falckenstein =

Prussian general (1797–1885)

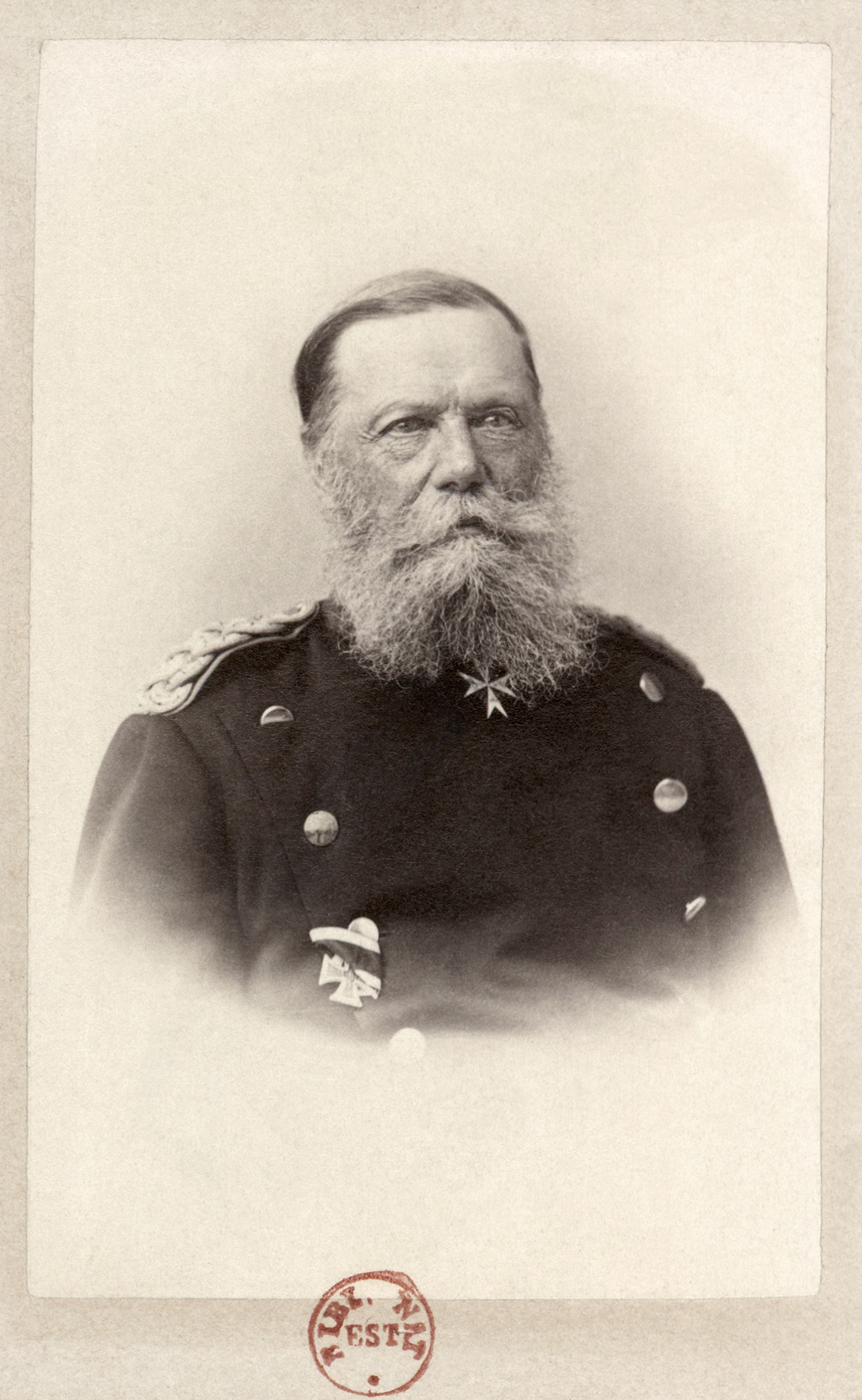
- Eduard Vogel von Falckenstein
- Born: Eduard Ernst Friedrich Hannibal Vogel von Falckenstein; 5 January 1797; Breslau, Kingdom of Prussia, Holy Roman Empire
- Died: 6 April 1885 (aged 88); Dolzig, Kingdom of Prussia, German Empire
- Military career
- Allegiance: Kingdom of Prussia; German Empire
- Branch: Prussian Army
- Service years: 1813–1873
- Rank: General der Infanterie
- Commands: VII Army Corps
- Conflicts: War of the Sixth Coalition; First Schleswig War; Second Schleswig War; Austro-Prussian War; Franco-Prussian War
- Awards: Iron Cross; Pour le Mérite

Eduard Ernst Friedrich Hannibal Vogel von Fal(c)kenstein (5 January 1797 – 6 April 1885) was a Prussian General der Infanterie.

== Biography ==
Vogel von Falckenstein was born in Breslau (now Wrocław, Poland) in Silesia, the son of Hannibal Vogel von Falckenstein (1750–1808). On 9 April 1829, he married Luise Gärtner (21 January 1813 – 24 August 1892) in Treuenbrietzen. His oldest son, Maximilian, also became a Prussian general.

After a preliminary education, Falckenstein entered the Prussian Army as a volunteer Jäger in 1813 during the Sixth Coalition, distinguishing himself at Montmirail. Promoted to major in 1841, he was wounded during street fighting in Berlin during the revolutions of 1848. Falckenstein fought in Holstein during the First Schleswig War, becoming the commander of the Garde-Schützen-Bataillon. He was named Chief of Staff of the III. Armeekorps in 1850.

Falckenstein was promoted to Oberst in 1851 and major general in 1855. He served as Director of the Military Economics Department from 1856–58; in the latter year he was promoted to lieutenant general, and placed in command of the V. Armeekorps.

At the beginning of the Second Schleswig War, Falckenstein served as Friedrich Graf von Wrangel's chief of staff, but was replaced by Helmuth von Moltke after Edwin Freiherr von Manteuffel pressured the Prussian Minister of War, Albrecht von Roon. He was awarded the Pour le Mérite on 22 April 1864, and named Governor of Jutland on 30 April. He received chief command of the VII. Armeekorps after the war and was promoted to general in 1865.

The Austro-Prussian War broke out in 1866, and Falckenstein commanded Prussia's forces in western Germany. While the bulk of the Prussian Army invaded Saxony and Bohemia to fight the Austrian Empire, Falckenstein's troops were to deal with Austria's allies: north of the Main River were troops of Hanover and Hesse-Kassel, while south of the Main were forces of Bavaria, Baden, Württemberg, and Hesse-Darmstadt.

At his disposal, Falckenstein had three divisions of troops, many of whom were not front-line soldiers, consisting instead of Prussian Landwehr, garrison troops, or north German allies. Beginning on 15 June, the "Corps Manteuffel" division and the Goeben Division invaded Hanover, while Beyer Division at Wetzlar invaded Hesse-Kassel. While the cities of Hanover and Kassel fell to the Prussians, the armies of each state fled in an attempt to unite with the Bavarians, who were slowly advancing northward and reluctant to cross the Main.

Falckenstein's leadership was mediocre during the campaign. The Hanoverian and Hessian troops systematically destroyed the railways during their retreat, while Falckenstein delayed in pursuing them, preferring instead to let his troops rest in Hanover. He eventually directed his three divisions to Göttingen, even after learning that Austria's allies had abandoned the city. Moltke ordered Falckenstein to finish off the Hanoverian Army, but Falckenstein wanted to let a lack of supplies force Major General Friedrich von Arentschildt and King George V of Hanover to surrender. After losing contact with the Hanoverians on 22 June and upon the advice of Otto von Bismarck, Falckenstein began marching south to Frankfurt to prevent a union of the disorganized forces of the German Confederation.

Moltke and King William I of Prussia were furious with Bismarck's interference and Falckenstein's slowness, ordering the general to attack the Hanoverians vigorously. Arentschildt's army suffered greatly from their lack of supplies, however, and were cornered at Langensalza in Prussian Saxony by the advance of Falckenstein's three divisions from the north and, organized by Moltke, 9,000 troops under General Eduard von Flies from Gotha to the south.

Falckenstein began preparing to attack Arentschildt's Hanoverian army after receiving a royal directive from William I. Flies, however, despite being outnumbered two to one, advanced on his own initiative against Arenttschildt on 27 June. Flies' Prussians were defeated in the Battle of Langensalza, but the Hanoverians were unable to capitalize on their victory. Falckenstein's troops arrived the following day, and Arentschildt was forced to flee eastward into territory ringed by Prussian railways, leading to Hanover's surrender at Nordhausen on 29 June.

Falckenstein's forces fought a series of engagements against south German states and entered Frankfurt on 16 July. Because of differences with the Prussian General Staff, he was forced to relinquish command to von Manteuffel and instead was made governor of Bohemia.

In 1867, Falckenstein was chosen as a representative of Königsberg (now Kaliningrad, Russia) to the Reichstag of the North German Confederation. During the Franco-Prussian War of 1870-71, Falckenstein was Generalgouverneur der deutschen Küstenlande (General Governor of the German Coastal Lands) and resided in Hanover. He organized the German coastal defenses and created a volunteer Seewehr as a naval militia.

Falckenstein retired in 1873. He died at Dolzig (now Dłużek, Poland), then in the Province of Brandenburg.

== Honours and awards ==
- Kingdom of Prussia:
  - Iron Cross, 2nd Class, 31 March 1814 (1813)
  - Knight of the Order of the Red Eagle, 3rd Class with Bow and Swords, 1848; Grand Cross with Oak Leaves and Swords, 3 August 1866
  - Knight's Cross of the Royal House Order of Hohenzollern, 18 January 1854
  - Knight of the Order of the Prussian Crown, 1st Class (50 years), 3 March 1863; with Enamel Band of the Red Eagle and Oak Leaves, 1865
  - Pour le Mérite (military), 22 April 1864
  - Knight of the Order of the Black Eagle, 8 April 1871; with Collar, 1872
- Austrian Empire: Grand Cross of the Imperial Order of Leopold, 1864
- Grand Duchy of Hesse: Grand Cross of the Merit Order of Philip the Magnanimous, 5 February 1861
- Nassau: Grand Cross of the Order of Adolphe of Nassau, with Swords, February 1861
- Kingdom of Saxony: Grand Cross of the Albert Order, 1861
- Württemberg: Grand Cross of the Friedrich Order, 1861
