= Mokra, Lubusz Voivodeship =

Mokra
- Village
- Location within Poland
- Coordinates: 51°49′27″N 15°3′0″E
- Country: Poland
- Voivodeship: Lubusz
- County: Żary
- Gmina: Lubsko
- Population: 81

Mokra [ˈmɔkra] (Lower Sorbian: Mokšy; Upper Sorbian: Nass) is a village in the administrative district of Gmina Lubsko, within Żary County, Lubusz Voivodeship, in western Poland.
