= Tuchola Żarska =

- Village
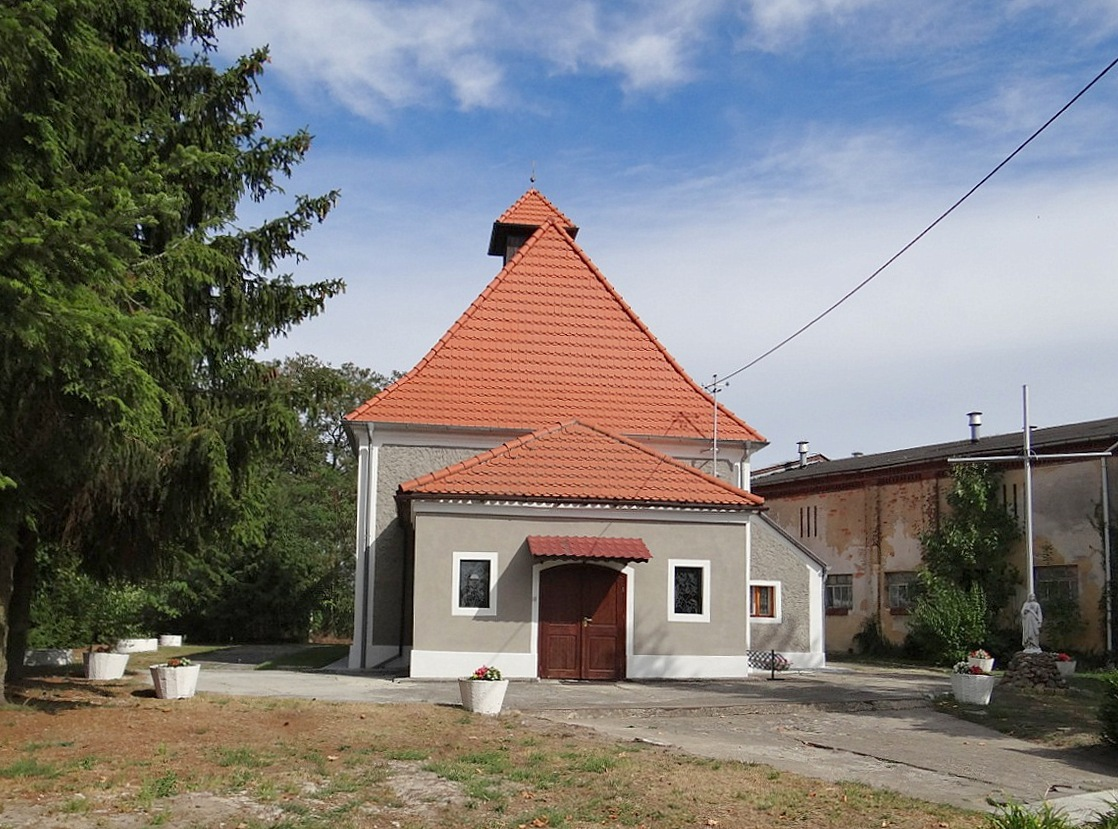
- Catholic church

- Location within Poland
- Coordinates: 51°47′48″N 15°4′42″E
- Country: Poland
- Voivodeship: Lubusz
- County: Żary
- Gmina: Lubsko
- Population: 518

Tuchola Żarska [tuˈxɔla ˈʐarska] (Lower Sorbian: Tuchola Žarska) is a village in the administrative district of Gmina Lubsko, within Żary County, Lubusz Voivodeship, in western Poland.
