= Dolzig Palace =

- Pałac w Dłużku
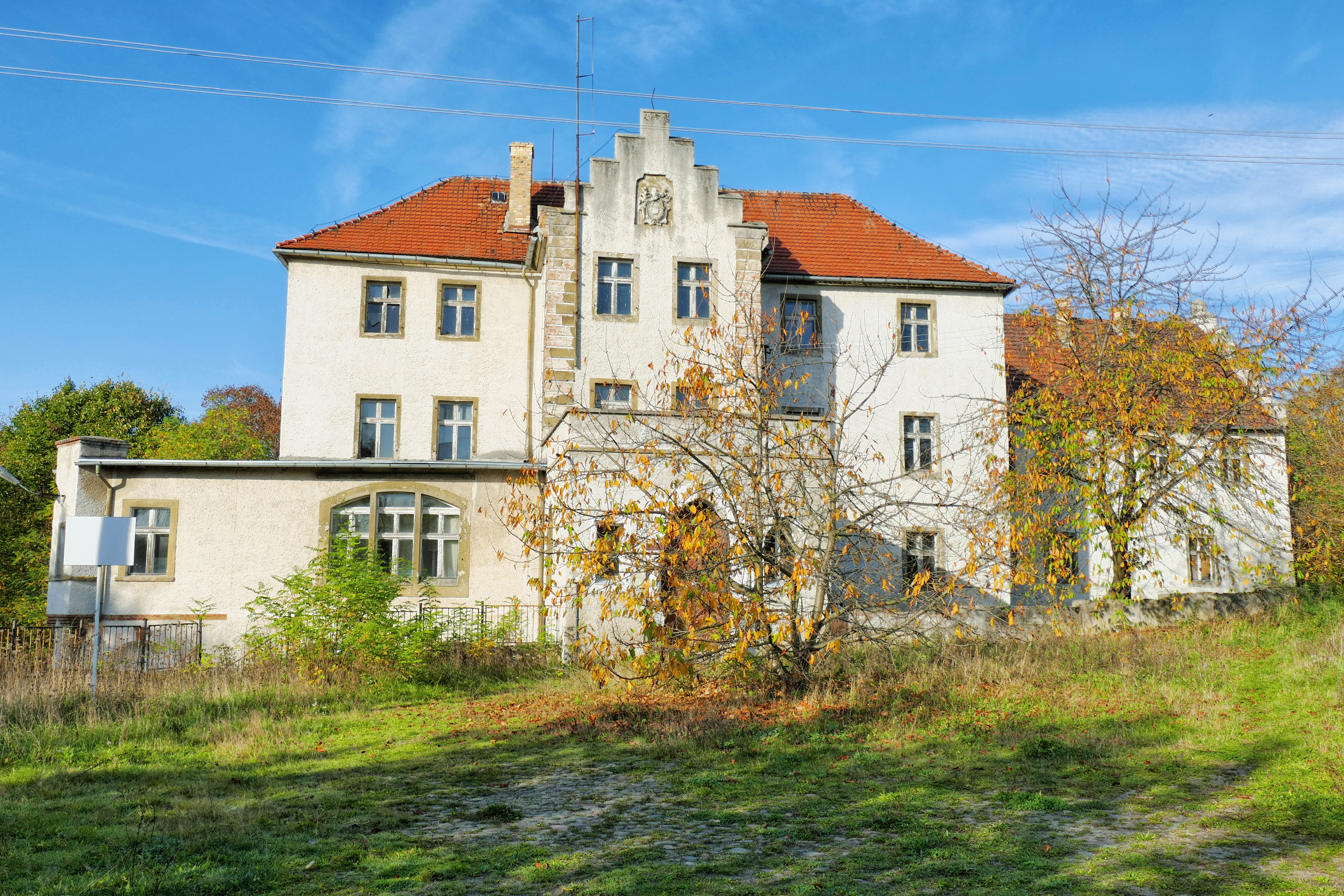
- Dolzig Palace, 2022
- Interactive map of the Dolzig Palace area

General information
- Architectural style: Baroque and Neo-Gothic
- Location: Dłużek, Lubusz Voivodeship, Poland
- Coordinates: 51°46′11″N 14°55′45″E
- Completed: 18th-19th century (current form)

Dolzig Palace (German: Schloss Dolzig) is a historic palace in the village of Dłużek (formerly Dolzig) in western Poland. The palace is best known as the birthplace of Augusta Victoria, the last German Empress and Queen of Prussia.

== History ==
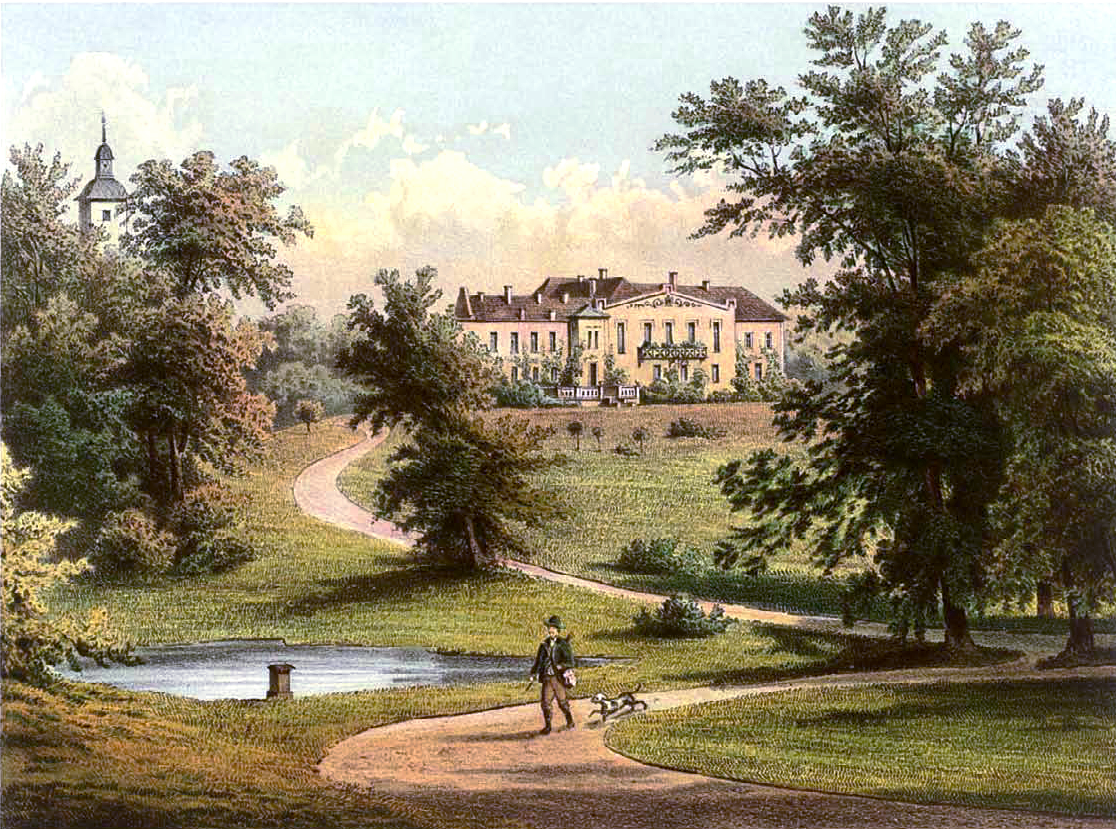
Dolzig Palace between 1857 and 1883

The estate of Dolzig formed part of the historical Neumark region of Brandenburg, in Prussia. The palace developed from an earlier noble manor and was rebuilt and expanded in the 18th and 19th centuries.

In 1845, the estate was sold to Baronin von Steinäcker. Through Fedor von Tschirschky, ownership passed in 1856 to Frederick VIII, Duke of Schleswig-Holstein, who acquired it shortly after his marriage. In 1858, the future German Empress Augusta Victoria was born here. She spent much of her childhood here, reportedly enjoying the palace's gardens and surroundings, which shaped her early interest in arts and social activities.

Before 1914, the estate was managed by General Eduard Vogel von Falckenstein, followed by his son, General Maximilian Vogel von Falckenstein. In 1923, the noble Vogel von Falckenstein family still owned Dolzig, with August Schütz acting as administrator.

After 1926, ownership of Dolzig passed to the Trützschler von Falkenstein family, including the later Major General Konrad Trützschler von Falkenstein and his wife Marie Paech-Seeläsgen. In 1929, the estate covered 1,000 hectares, of which 620 hectares were forested. Hermann Weidemann served as administrator. At that time, the owning family lived in Berlin-Lichterfelde. This family and their heirs remained owners until 1945.

After the Second World War, when the region became part of Poland, the palace was nationalised. It was used for various public and residential purposes, including housing and functions connected with the former state agricultural farms (PGR).

During the post-war decades the building fell into serious disrepair. Structural damage, neglect and lack of conservation led to the loss of many original architectural details.

== Architecture ==
The palace represents a multi-phase architectural development. Its present form largely reflects 19th-century rebuilding, incorporating Baroque and Neo-Gothic elements. The complex originally included a landscaped park surrounding the residence.

The site is officially listed as a protected monument in the Lubusz Voivodeship heritage register.

== Restoration and plans ==
In recent years the palace has been the subject of revitalisation efforts. Reports indicate plans for the creation of a cultural and regional heritage centre within the restored structure.

Local authorities and heritage bodies have confirmed that conservation and redevelopment projects aim to preserve the historical significance of the birthplace of the last German Empress while adapting the building for cultural use.
