= Dąbrowa, Żary County =

Dąbrowa
- Village
- Location within Poland
- Coordinates: 51°51′54″N 14°56′7″E
- Country: Poland
- Voivodeship: Lubusz
- County: Żary
- Gmina: Lubsko
- Population: 160

Dąbrowa [dɔmˈbrɔva] is a village in the administrative district of Gmina Lubsko, within Żary County, Lubusz Voivodeship, in western Poland.
