= Chocicz =

- Village
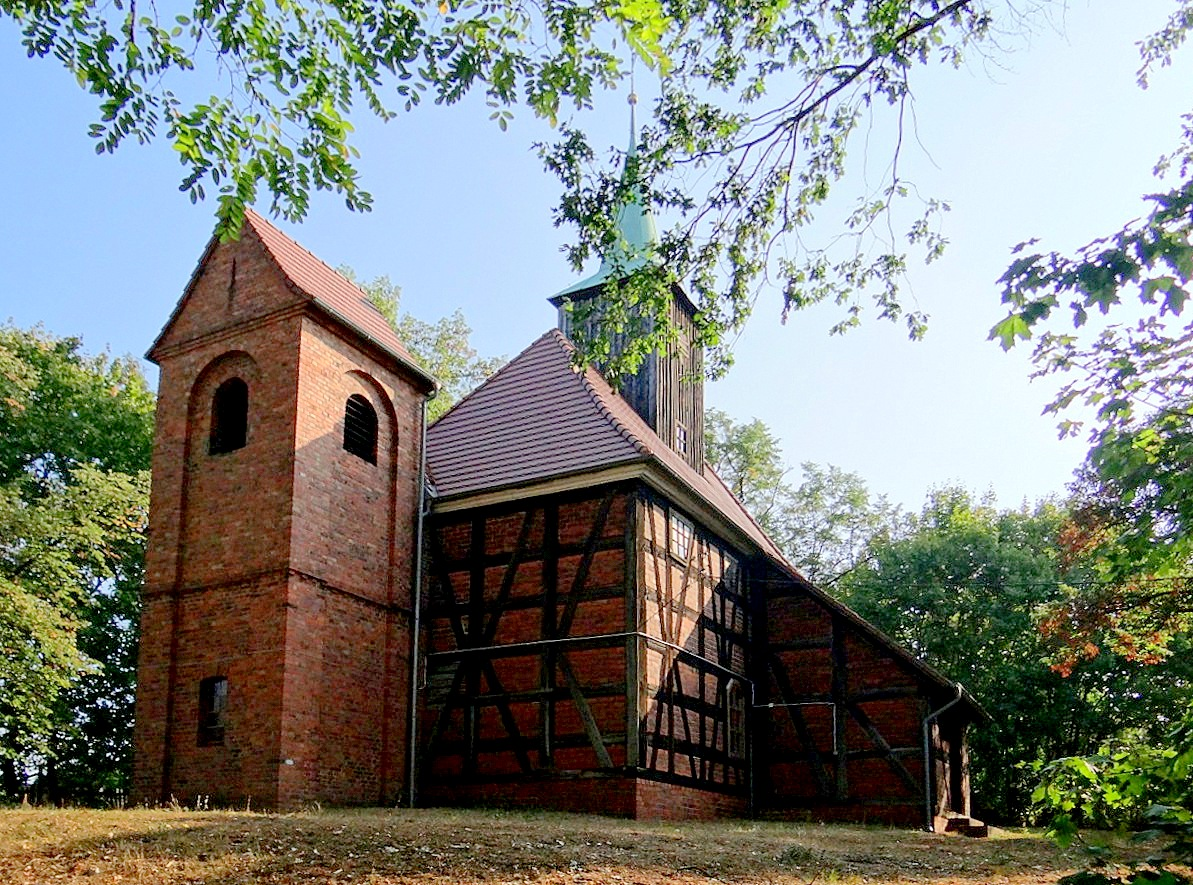
- Catholic church

- Location within Poland
- Coordinates: 51°51′21″N 15°1′40″E
- Country: Poland
- Voivodeship: Lubusz
- County: Żary
- Gmina: Lubsko
- Population: 355

Chocicz [ˈxɔt͡ɕit͡ʂ] (Upper Sorbian: Chocic) is a village in the administrative district of Gmina Lubsko, within Żary County, Lubusz Voivodeship, in western Poland.
