= Janowice, Lubusz Voivodeship =

Janowice
- Village
- Location within Poland
- Coordinates: 51°49′45″N 15°1′46″E
- Country: Poland
- Voivodeship: Lubusz
- County: Żary
- Gmina: Lubsko
- Population: 18

Janowice [janɔˈvit͡sɛ] is a village in the administrative district of Gmina Lubsko, within Żary County, Lubusz Voivodeship, in western Poland.
