= Stara Woda =

- Village
- Location within Poland
- Coordinates: 51°48′33″N 15°2′43″E
- Country: Poland
- Voivodeship: Lubusz
- County: Żary
- Gmina: Lubsko
- Population: 177

Stara Woda [ˈstara ˈvɔda] is a village in the administrative district of Gmina Lubsko, within Żary County, Lubusz Voivodeship, in western Poland.
