= Seewehr =

Seewehr (literally Sea Defence) was the maritime counterpart of the German Landwehr army reserve during the time of the Norddeutscher Bund and of the German Empire.

While the comparatively few infantrymen of the small Marinecorps (Seebataillon) were professional soldiers, the Imperial German Navy relied on conscripts. Sailors of the Imperial German Navy served three years in active duty. Afterwards they were for two years part of the "Reserve", where they had to take part in exercises and parades. Having finished the regular time in his reserve-unit, the soldier became part of the Landwehr and after becoming 40 years old, he would be part of the Landsturm, literally land storm until the age of 45. While sailors until 40 years of age became part of the Seewehr, there was no separately named institution like Seesturm for older soldiers, due to linguistic reasons.

One of the predecessors, the Prussian Seewehr, was created as a volunteer naval militia during the Franco-Prussian War by Eduard Vogel von Falckenstein. The Seewehr was abolished together with the Landwehr after World War I was lost and the Treaty of Versailles demanded a reduction of military forces in Germany.
