= Grabków, Lubusz Voivodeship =

Grabków
- Village
- Location within Poland
- Coordinates: 51°50′N 14°56′E
- Country: Poland
- Voivodeship: Lubusz
- County: Żary
- Gmina: Lubsko
- Population: 237

Grabków [ˈɡrapkuf] (Upper Sorbian: Grabkow) is a village in the administrative district of Gmina Lubsko, within Żary County, Lubusz Voivodeship, in western Poland.
