= Gmina Lubsko =

Gmina Lubsko Lubsko Commune
- Gmina
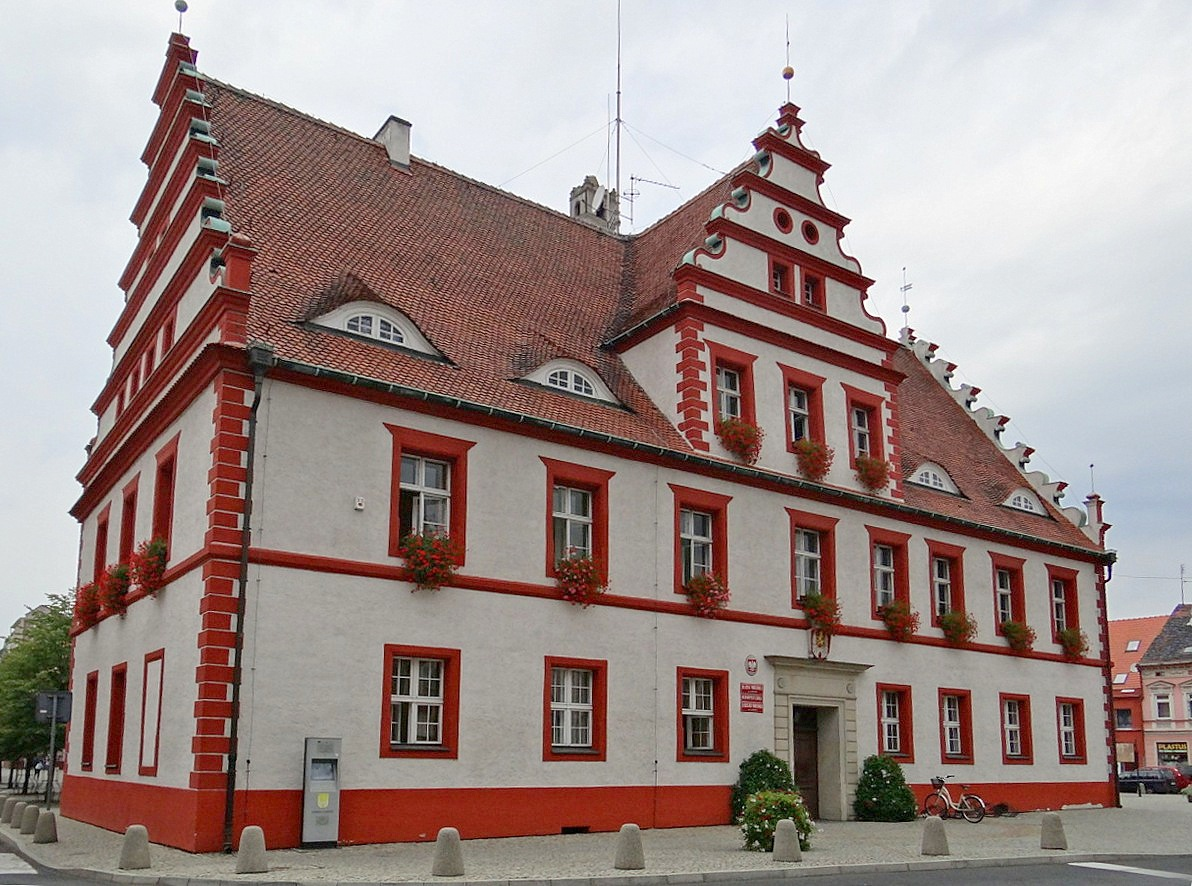
- Town Hall in Lubsko, seat of the gmina office

- Flag Coat of arms
- Interactive map of Gmina Lubsko
- Coordinates (Lubsko): 51°47′N 14°58′E
- Country: Poland
- Voivodeship: Lubusz
- County: Żary
- Seat: Lubsko

Area
  - Total: 182.69 km^{2} (70.54 sq mi)

Population (2019-06-30)
  - Total: 18,452
  - Density: 101.00/km^{2} (261.59/sq mi)
  - Urban: 13,921
  - Rural: 4,531
- Time zone: UTC+1 (CET)
  - Summer (DST): UTC+2 (CEST)
- Vehicle registration: FZA
- Website: https://lubsko.pl

Gmina Lubsko is an urban-rural gmina (administrative district) in Żary County, Lubusz Voivodeship, in western Poland. Its seat is the town of Lubsko, which lies approximately 21 kilometres (13 mi) north-west of Żary and 41 km (25 mi) south-west of Zielona Góra.

The gmina covers an area of 182.69 square kilometres (70.5 sq mi), and as of 2019 its total population is 18,452.

== Villages ==
Apart from the town of Lubsko, Gmina Lubsko contains the villages and settlements of Białków, Chełm Żarski, Chocicz, Chocimek, Dąbrowa, Dłużek, Dłużek-Kolonia, Gareja, Górzyn, Gozdno, Grabków, Janowice, Kałek, Lutol, Małowice, Mierków, Mokra, Nowiniec, Osiek, Raszyn, Stara Woda, Tarnów, Tuchola Duża, Tuchola Mała, Tuchola Żarska, Tymienice and Ziębikowo.

== Neighbouring gminas ==
Gmina Lubsko is bordered by the gminas of Bobrowice, Brody, Gubin, Jasień, Nowogród Bobrzański and Tuplice.

== Twin towns – sister cities ==
Gmina Lubsko is twinned with:

- Brody, Poland
- Forst, Germany
- Gribskov, Denmark
- Masny, France
- Pavlohrad, Ukraine
- Vlotho, Germany
