= Małowice, Lubusz Voivodeship =

Małowice
- Village
- Location within Poland
- Coordinates: 51°48′52″N 15°1′49″E
- Country: Poland
- Voivodeship: Lubusz
- County: Żary
- Gmina: Lubsko
- Population: 84

Małowice [mawɔˈvit͡sɛ] is a village in the administrative district of Gmina Lubsko, within Żary County, Lubusz Voivodeship, in western Poland.
