= Lubsko =

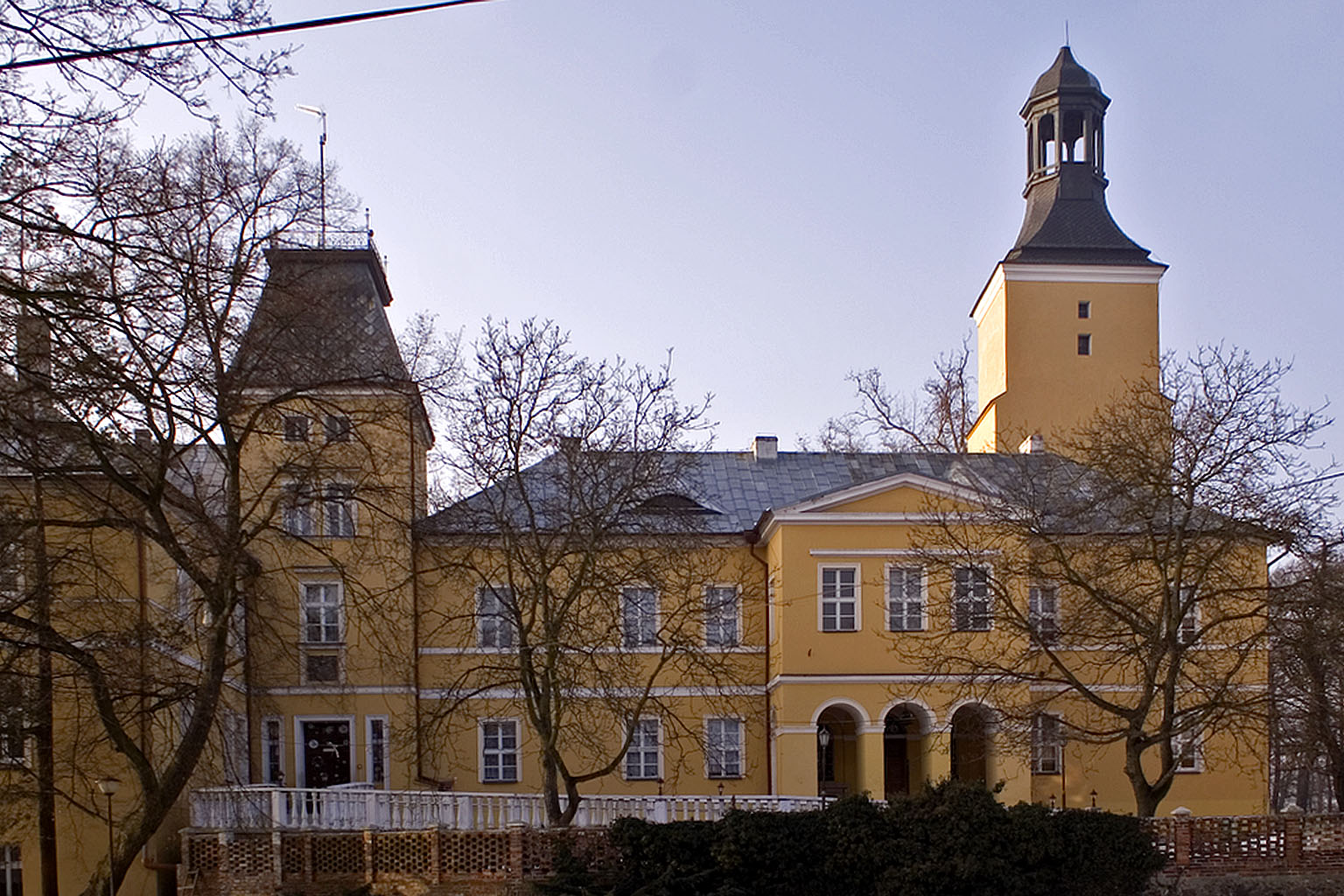
- Lubsko castle

- Flag Coat of arms

- Location within Poland
- Coordinates: 51°47′N 14°58′E
- Country: Poland
- Voivodeship: Lubusz
- County: Żary
- Gmina: Lubsko
- Established: before 1258
- Town rights: 1283

Government
  - Mayor: Janusz Dudojć

Area
  - Total: 12.56 km^{2} (4.85 sq mi)
- Highest elevation: 122 m (400 ft)
- Lowest elevation: 65 m (213 ft)

Population (2019-06-30)
  - Total: 13,921
  - Density: 1,108/km^{2} (2,871/sq mi)
- Time zone: UTC+1 (CET)
  - Summer (DST): UTC+2 (CEST)
- Postal code: 68-300
- Area code: +48 68
- Car plates: FZA
- Climate: Cfb
- Website: https://lubsko.pl

Lubsko [ˈlupskɔ] (German: Sommerfeld, Lower Sorbian: Žemŕ), formerly Zemsz, is a town in Żary County in the Lubusz Voivodeship in western Poland. It is the administrative seat of the Gmina Lubsko and has a population of 13,921 (2019).

== History ==
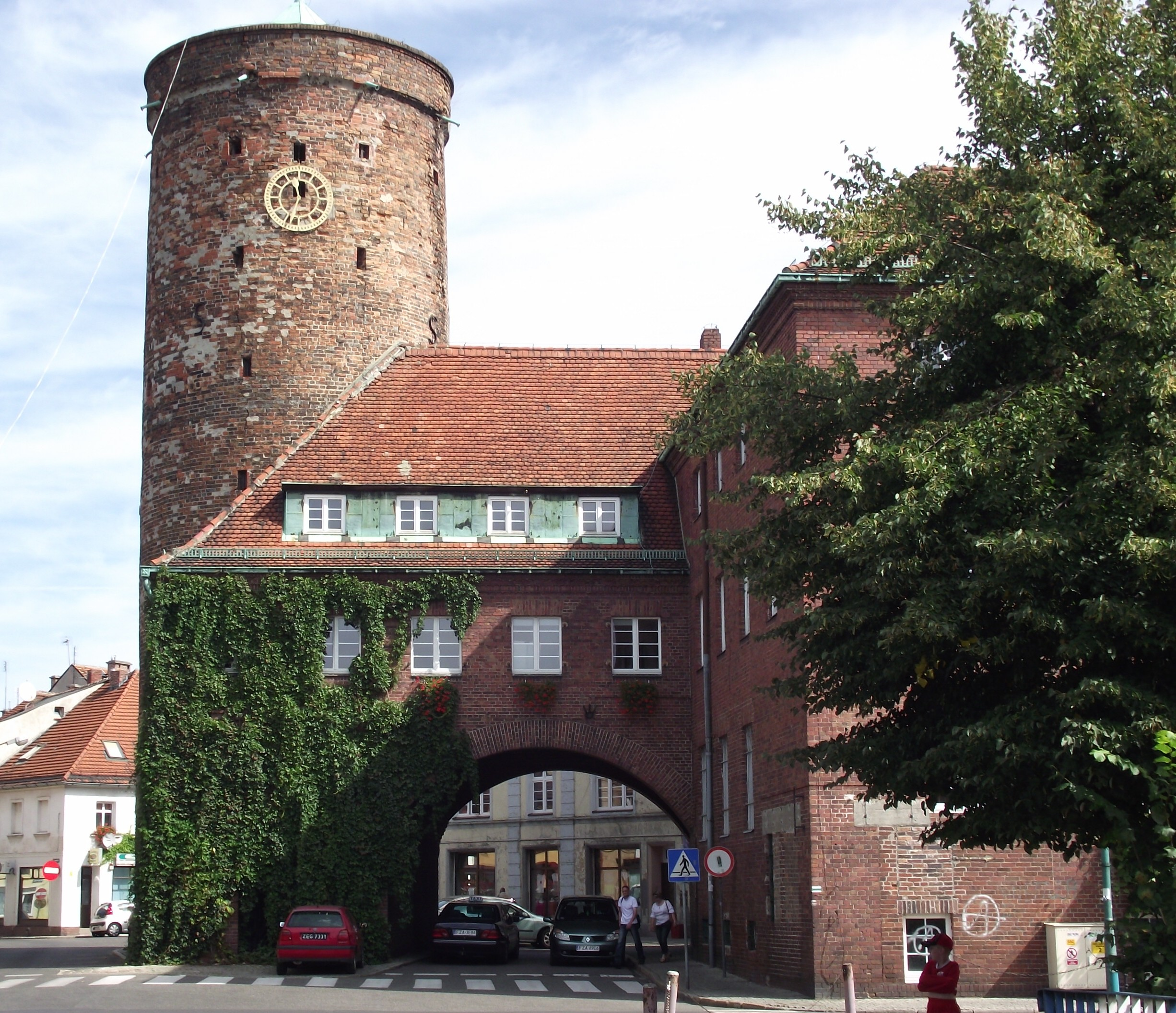
Żary Gate Tower, a remnant of medieval town fortifications

In the early Middle Ages there was a West Slavic or Lechitic stronghold here, followed by a market settlement on the border between Poland and Lusatia. Probably its oldest name was Żemrje. It is located within Lower Lusatia, but at some times it also belonged to Silesia, e.g. under the Polish rulers Bolesław the Brave and Henry the Bearded. The town was first documented in 1258 and received town privileges by the Lusatian margrave Henry III of Wettin in 1283. The name Sommerfeld, German for "summer field", already appeared in an 1106 deed allegedly issued by margrave Henry I of Wettin, who nevertheless had died three years before. The Wettin margraves sold the town to Brandenburg in 1304. Given in pawn several times, Emperor Charles IV of Luxembourg finally granted Sommerfeld with Lower Lusatia to the Silesian Piast duke Bolko II the Small. In 1364, Bolko II granted new privileges to the town. After Bolko's death in 1368 it was seized as a reverted fief by the Bohemian (Czech) Crown. In 1411, Czech King Wenceslaus IV granted the town the privilege of minting coins. In 1429, the Hussites invaded the town. During the war of the succession of the Duchy of Głogów, the town returned under Polish rule and in 1464 it paid homage and swore allegiance to Piast Duke John II the Mad.

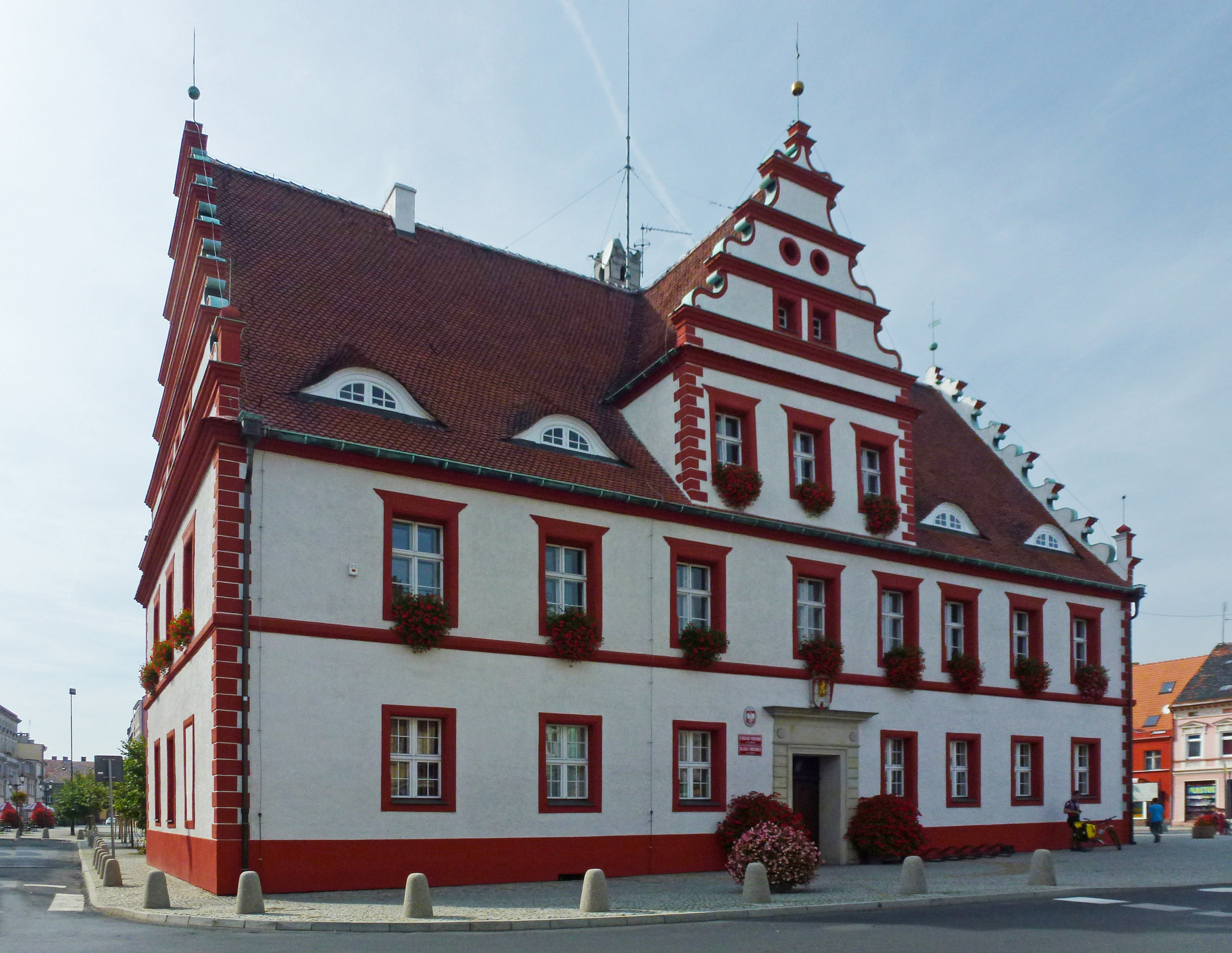
Renaissance Town Hall

When the Brandenburg Elector Albert III Achilles of Hohenzollern acquired the nearby Silesian towns of Krossen (Krosno Odrzańskie) and Züllichau (Sulechów) in 1482, the adjacent Sommerfeld area too came into the possession of Brandenburg and was incorporated into the Neumark district. At the time, the town and the surrounding area were inhabited mainly by Slavonic Sorbs. In 1496 and 1597 the town suffered from fires, and in 1527 1,100 inhabitants died of an epidemic. During the Napoleonic Wars and Polish national liberation fights in February 1813, Polish uhlans quartered in the town. From 1816 on the town belonged to the Prussian Province of Brandenburg. In 1846 Sommerfeld received a station on the railway line connecting Berlin with Breslau (Wrocław). From 1871 to 1945 the town was part of Germany.

During World War II, the Germans established seven forced labour camps in the town. The town was captured by the Soviets in February 1945, and in June it was handed over to Poland in accordance with the Potsdam Agreement. During the war the town miraculously survived from any severe destruction and artillery fire, thus its medieval Old Town and Market Square are preserved to this day. In the years that followed World War II the remaining inhabitants of Sommerfeld were gradually expelled and the town was resettled with ethnic Poles, expelled from the pre-war Polish Eastern Borderlands, annexed by the Soviet Union. Initially, the new Polish administrative name was Zemsz, however, it was later changed to Lubsko for unknown reasons. The name Zemsz is still used by some locals and historians alongside the current one.

In 1947 the "Patria" cinema, and in 1964 the Lubsko Culture House was opened.

== Sights ==
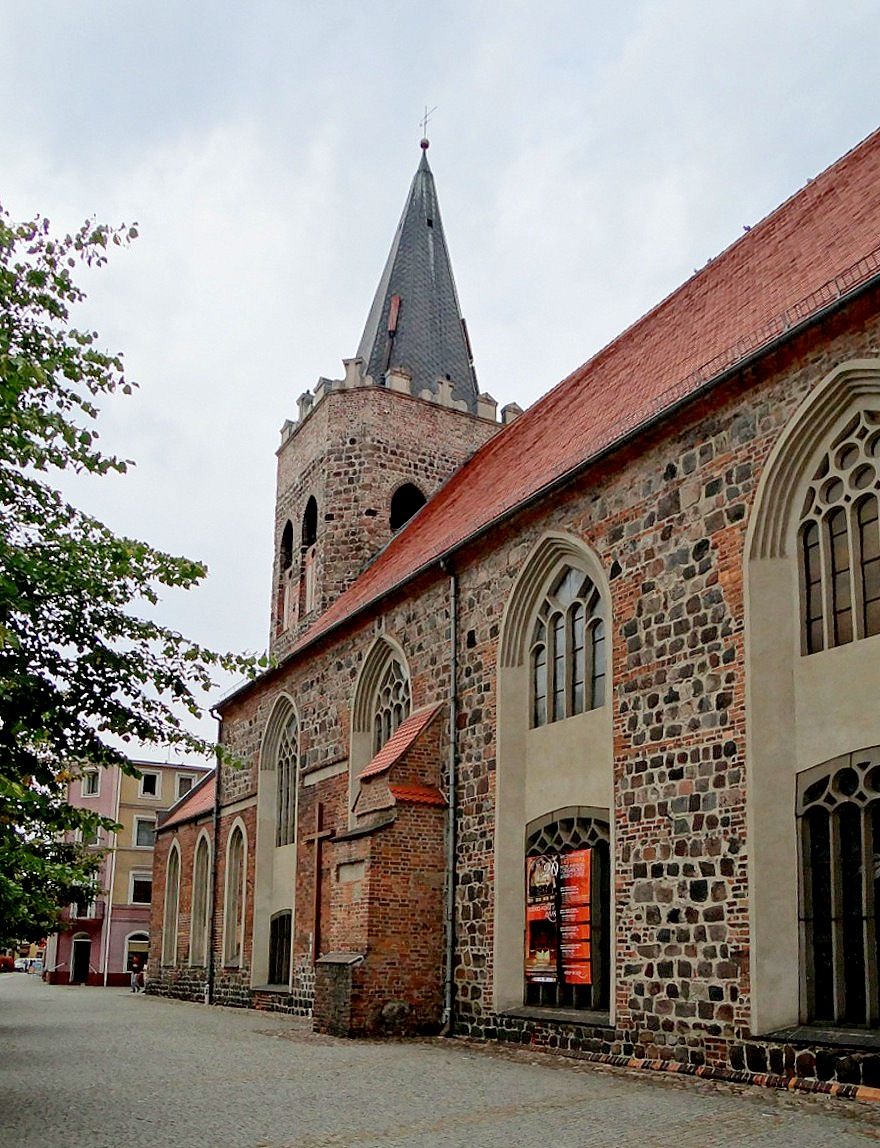
Church of the Visitation

The historic landmarks of Lubsko are:

- the Lubsko Castle
- the Gothic Church of the Visitation
- the Żary Gate Tower (Wieża Bramy Żarskiej), a remnant of medieval town fortifications
- the Renaissance town hall

== Notable people ==
- Carl Friedrich Warnstorf (1837–1921), German educator and bryologist
- Carl Herman Unthan (1848–1949), German violinist
- The last German Empress Augusta Viktoria of Schleswig-Holstein was born in Dolzig Palace (Dłużek, part of modern Lubsko) in 1858.
- The neurologist Alfred Goldscheider was born in Sommerfeld in the same year.
- Gerhard Domagk attended school in Sommerfeld until he was 14; the scientist would later win the Nobel Prize in Physiology or Medicine in 1939.
- The actress Joanna Brodzik attended elementary school in Lubsko in the 1980s.
- Polish singer Ewelina Flinta was born in Lubsko.

== Twin towns – sister cities ==
See twin towns of Gmina Lubsko.
