= Tuchola Mała =

- Village
- Location within Poland
- Coordinates: 51°48′18″N 15°4′48″E
- Country: Poland
- Voivodeship: Lubusz
- County: Żary
- Gmina: Lubsko
- Population: 280

Tuchola Mała [tuˈxɔla ˈmawa] (Lower Sorbian: Mała Tuchola) is a village in the administrative district of Gmina Lubsko, within Żary County, Lubusz Voivodeship, in western Poland.
