= Ziębikowo =

- Village
- Location within Poland
- Coordinates: 51°47′55″N 14°53′56″E
- Country: Poland
- Voivodeship: Lubusz
- County: Żary
- Gmina: Lubsko
- Elevation: 64 m (210 ft)
- Population: 102

Ziębikowo [ʑɛmbiˈkɔvɔ] (Lower Sorbian: Zěbikow) is a village in the administrative district of Gmina Lubsko, within Żary County, Lubusz Voivodeship, in western Poland.
