= Nowiniec =

- Village
- Location within Poland
- Coordinates: 51°47′47″N 14°59′42″E
- Country: Poland
- Voivodeship: Lubusz
- County: Żary
- Gmina: Lubsko

Nowiniec [nɔˈviɲɛt͡s] is a village in the administrative district of Gmina Lubsko, within Żary County, Lubusz Voivodeship, in western Poland.
