= Dłużek-Kolonia =

- Settlement
- Location within Poland
- Coordinates: 51°45′40″N 14°55′49″E
- Country: Poland
- Voivodeship: Lubusz
- County: Żary
- Gmina: Lubsko

Dłużek-Kolonia [ˈdwuʐɛk kɔˈlɔɲa] (Lower Sorbian: Dłužek-Kolonija; Upper Sorbian: Dłužek-Kolonie) is a settlement in the administrative district of Gmina Lubsko, within Żary County, Lubusz Voivodeship, in western Poland.
