= Tuchola Duża =

- Village
- Location within Poland
- Coordinates: 51°47′N 15°4′E
- Country: Poland
- Voivodeship: Lubusz
- County: Żary
- Gmina: Lubsko
- Population: 280

Tuchola Duża [tuˈxɔla ˈduʐa] (Upper Sorbian: Wjelika Tuchola) is a village in the administrative district of Gmina Lubsko, within Żary County, Lubusz Voivodeship, in western Poland.
