= Tymienice, Lubusz Voivodeship =

Tymienice
- Village
- Location within Poland
- Coordinates: 51°51′57″N 14°58′3″E
- Country: Poland
- Voivodeship: Lubusz
- County: Żary
- Gmina: Lubsko
- Population: 102

Tymienice [tɨmjɛˈnit͡sɛ] is a village in the administrative district of Gmina Lubsko, within Żary County, Lubusz Voivodeship, in western Poland.
