= Chocimek =

- Village
- Location within Poland
- Coordinates: 51°50′23″N 15°3′35″E
- Country: Poland
- Voivodeship: Lubusz
- County: Żary
- Gmina: Lubsko
- Population: 65 (2,011)

Chocimek [xɔˈt͡ɕimɛk] is a village in the administrative district of Gmina Lubsko, within Żary County, Lubusz Voivodeship, in western Poland.
