= Raszyn, Lubusz Voivodeship =

Raszyn
- Village
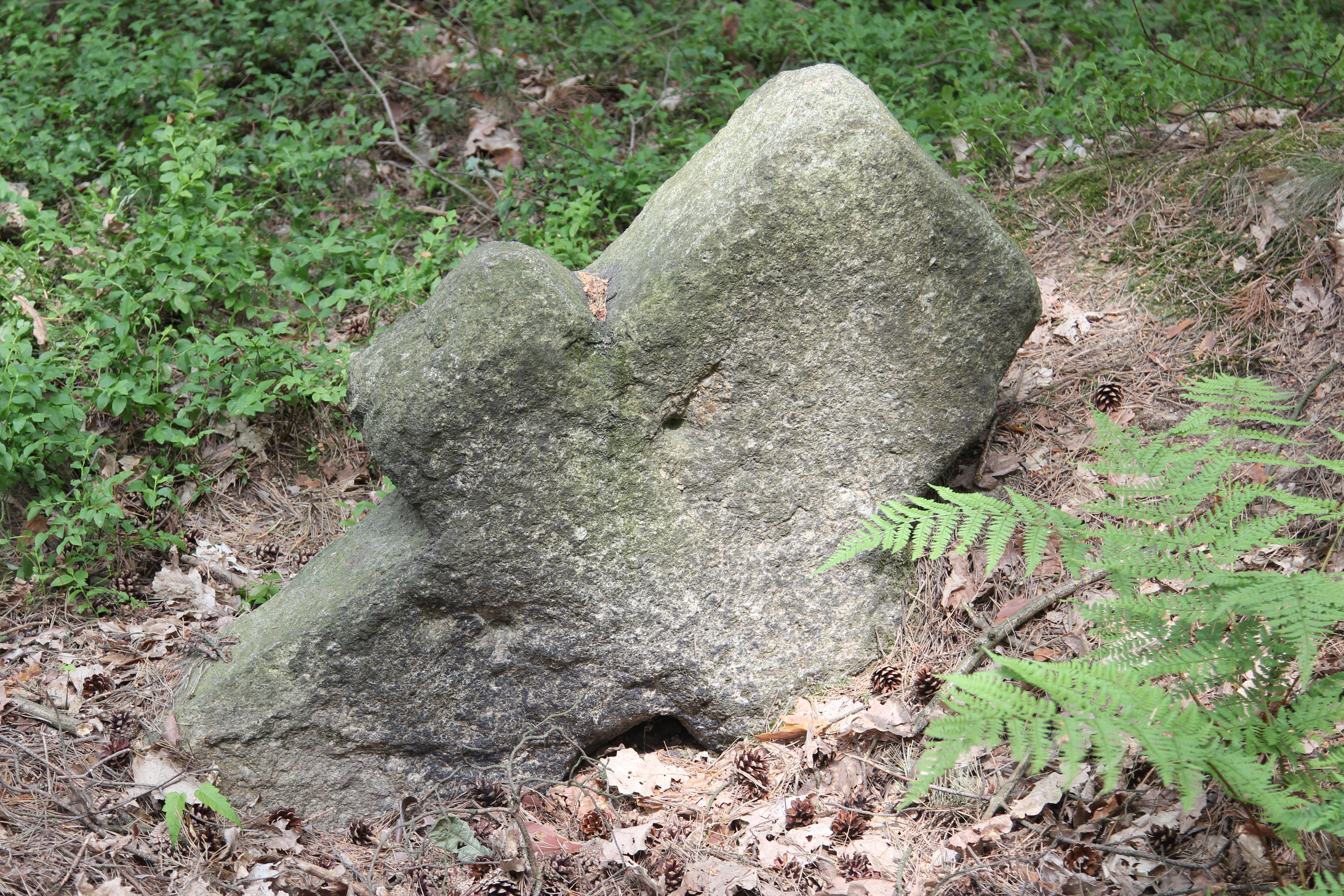
- 16th-century stone cross

- Location within Poland
- Coordinates: 51°48′36″N 14°56′23″E
- Country: Poland
- Voivodeship: Lubusz
- County: Żary
- Gmina: Lubsko
- Elevation: 93 m (305 ft)

Population
  - Total: 218
- Time zone: UTC+1 (CET)
  - Summer (DST): UTC+2 (CEST)
- Vehicle registration: FZA

Raszyn [ˈraʂɨn] is a village in the administrative district of Gmina Lubsko, within Żary County, Lubusz Voivodeship, in western Poland.
