= Chełm Żarski =

- Village
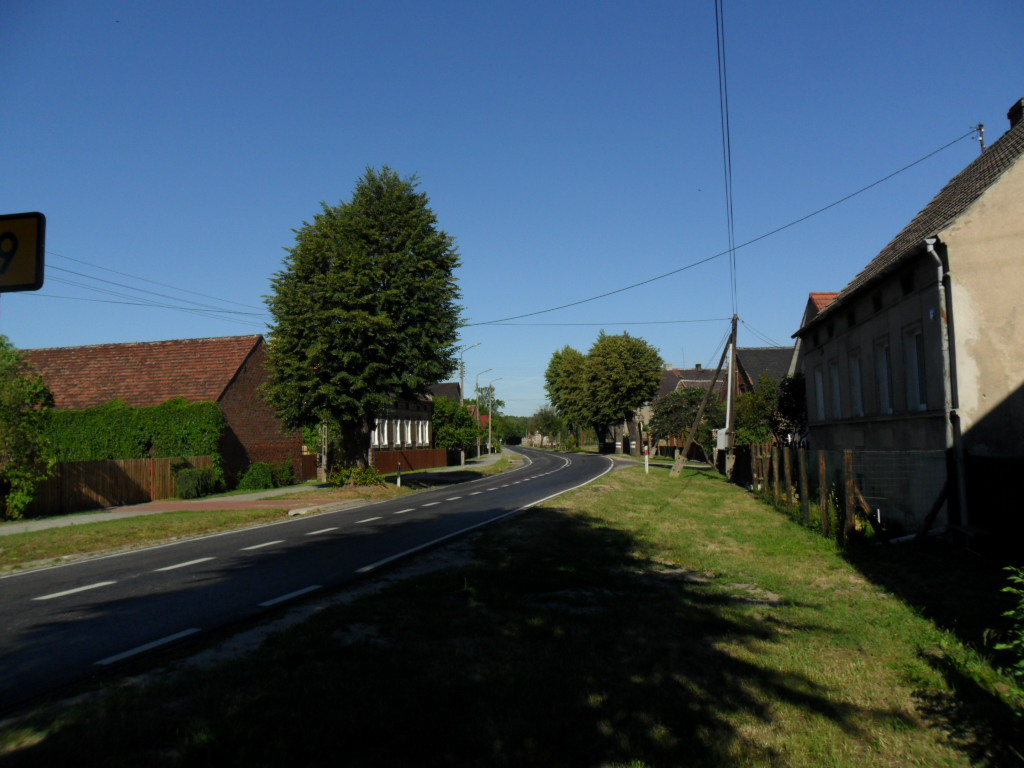

- Location within Poland
- Coordinates: 51°47′6″N 14°54′5″E
- Country: Poland
- Voivodeship: Lubusz
- County: Żary
- Gmina: Lubsko
- Elevation: 67 m (220 ft)
- Population: 89

Chełm Żarski (Polish pronunciation: [xɛwm ˈʐarskʲi]) is a village in the administrative district of Gmina Lubsko, within Żary County, Lubusz Voivodeship, in western Poland.
