= Górzyn, Lubusz Voivodeship =

Górzyn
- Village
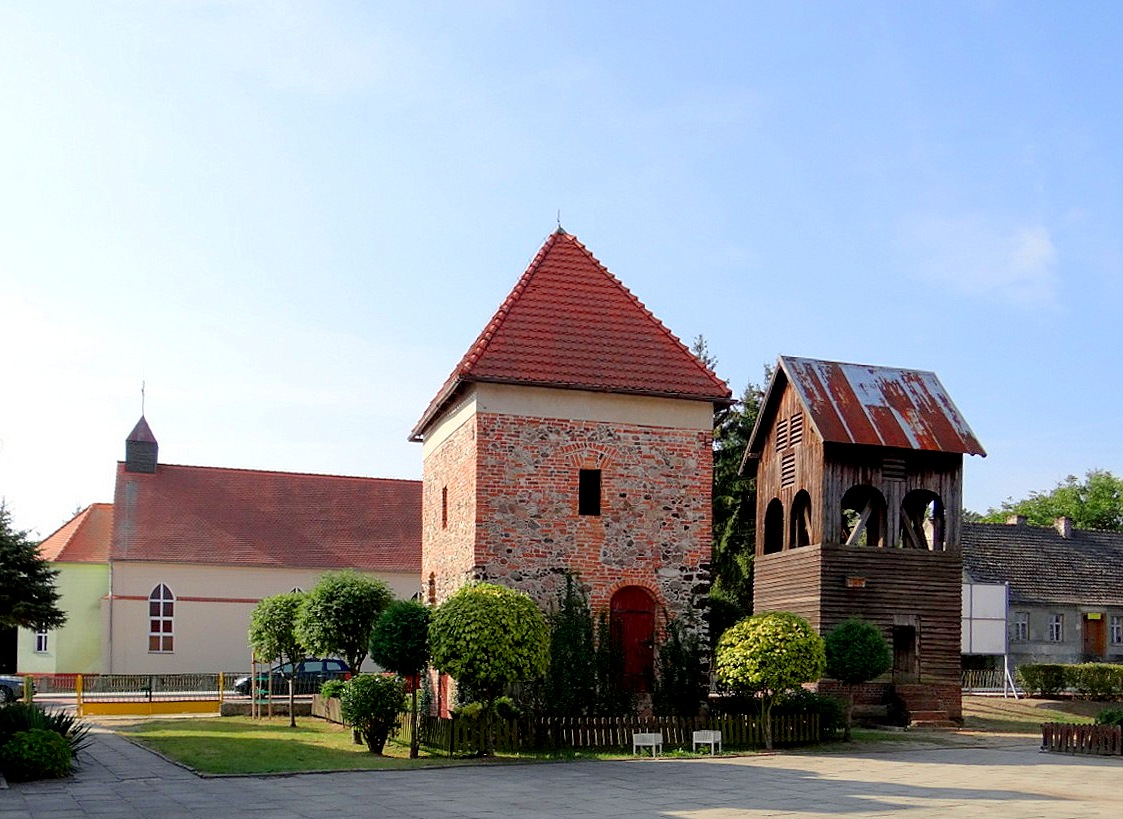

- Location within Poland
- Coordinates: 51°49′45″N 14°58′43″E
- Country: Poland
- Voivodeship: Lubusz
- County: Żary
- Gmina: Lubsko
- Elevation: 70 m (230 ft)
- Population: 894

Górzyn [ˈɡuʐɨn] [ɕɛrakɔˈvit͡ʂki] is a village in the administrative district of Gmina Lubsko, within Żary County, Lubusz Voivodeship, in western Poland.
