= Osiek, Żary County =

Osiek
- Village
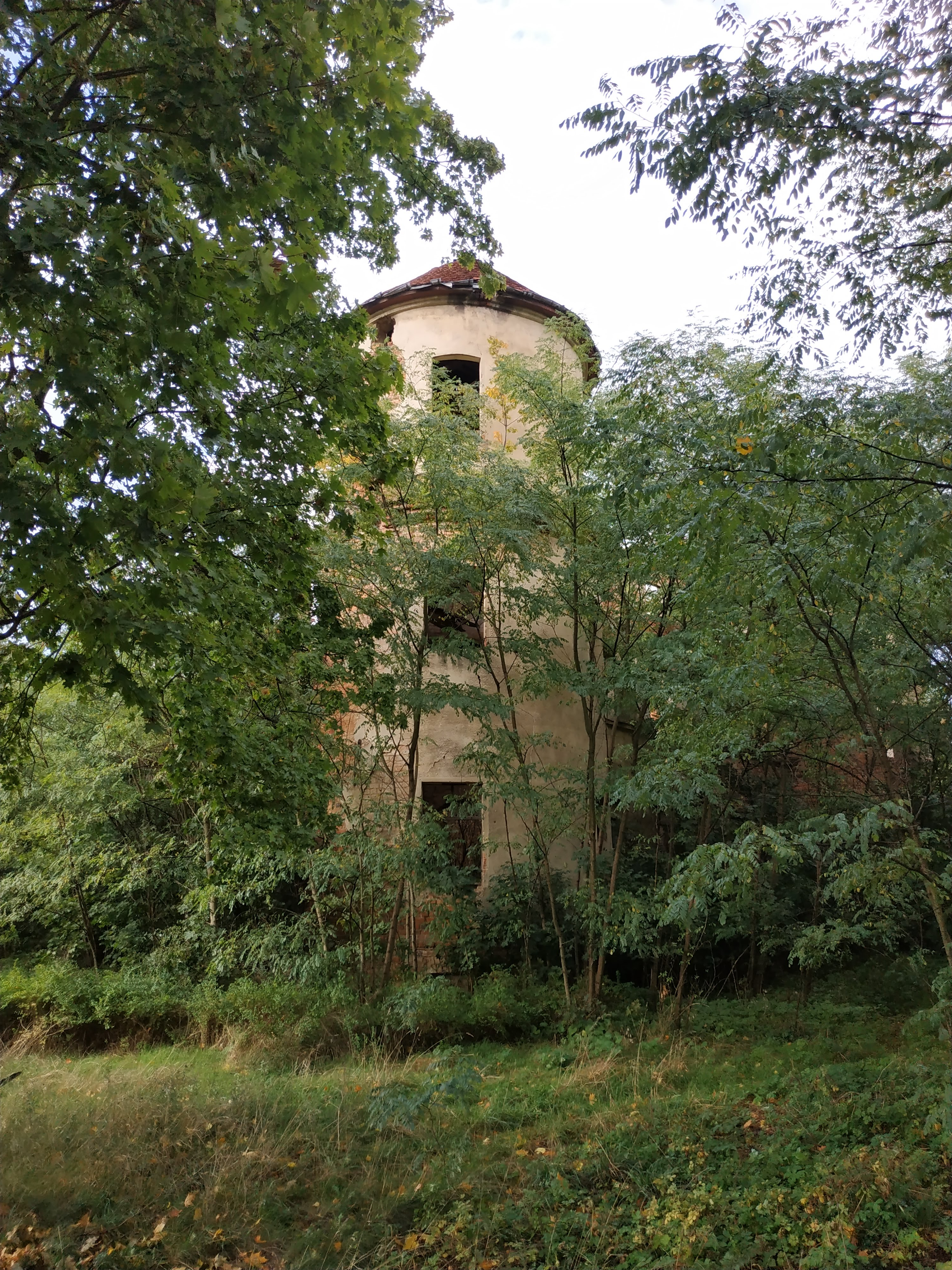

- Location within Poland
- Coordinates: 51°49′36″N 14°55′23″E
- Country: Poland
- Voivodeship: Lubusz
- County: Żary
- Gmina: Lubsko
- Elevation: 63.5 m (208 ft)
- Population: 150

Osiek [ˈɔɕɛk] (Lower Sorbian: Osjek) is a village in the administrative district of Gmina Lubsko, within Żary County, Lubusz Voivodeship, in western Poland.
