= Kałek, Lubusz Voivodeship =

Kałek
- Village
- Location within Poland
- Coordinates: 51°52′40″N 14°57′20″E
- Country: Poland
- Voivodeship: Lubusz
- County: Żary
- Gmina: Lubsko
- Population: 60

Kałek [ˈkawɛk] is a village in the administrative district of Gmina Lubsko, within Żary County, Lubusz Voivodeship, in western Poland.
