= Tarnów, Żary County =

Tarnów
- Village
- Location within Poland
- Coordinates: 51°46′37″N 14°52′24″E
- Country: Poland
- Voivodeship: Lubusz
- County: Żary
- Gmina: Lubsko
- Elevation: 66 m (217 ft)
- Population: 58

Tarnów [ˈtarnuf] (Upper Sorbian: Tarnow) is a village in the administrative district of Gmina Lubsko, within Żary County, Lubusz Voivodeship, in western Poland.
