= Ivane Amilakhvari =

Georgian nobleman (1829–1905)

General, nobleman Ivan Amilakhori
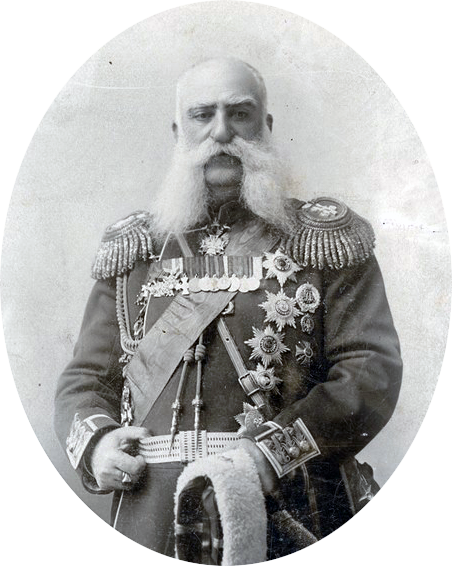
- General Ivane Amilakhori
- Born: 26 January 1829; Chala, Russian Empire
- Died: 27 August 1905 (aged 76); Chala, Russian Empire
- Burial place: Tbilisi, Russian Empire
- Military career
- Allegiance: Russian Empire
- Branch: Imperial Russian Army
- Service years: 1850–1905
- Rank: Adjutant general in the rank of General of the cavalry
- Unit: mostly cavalry
- Commands: Several imperial Russian army corps Caucasian Army; Governor-general of Baku
- Conflicts: Caucasian War; Crimean War; Franco-Prussian War; Russo-Turkish War

Ivane Amilakhori (Georgian: ივანე ამილახვარი, Russian: Иван Гивич [Егорович] Амилахвари [Амилахори]; 26 January 1829 – 27 August 1905) was a Georgian nobleman and a military commander in Imperial Russian service.

He was born in the village Chala in what is now Shida Kartli region (then under Russian rule) to a prominent Georgian aristocratic family. Educated at the Tiflis nobility gymnasium, he enrolled in the Nizhny Novgorod Dragoon regiment in 1850. Amilakhvari spent the first three years of his military career fighting the recalcitrant mountainous clans during the Caucasian War and was wounded at the action of Chakpak on 31 August 1853. During the Crimean War (1853-1856), he fought on the Caucasus front against the Ottoman Empire and distinguished himself at the Battle of Choloki where Amilakhvari, with his irregular unit of Georgian hunters completely destroyed an entire Ottoman battalion. After another three years of his service in Chechnya (1856-1859), Amilakhvari was promoted to colonel and assigned to command the Nizhny Novgorod dragoon regiment from 1864 to 1873.

In 1871, Tsar Alexander II of Russia sent him to Stuttgart to congratulate King Charles I of Württemberg on the occasion of the 25th anniversary of his being the chief of Nizhny Novgorod Dragoon Regiment. The same year, Amilakhvari visited the German army headquarters at Paris during the Franco-Prussian War. On return, he obtained the rank of major general in 1873 and returned to the service in the Caucasus where he took part in a series of battles during the Russo-Turkish War (1877–1878). After the war, he served as a commander of a cavalry division in the Caucasus and was promoted to lieutenant general in May 1883. In 1886, through negotiation and persuasion, he managed to stop unrest in Chechnya. Commissioned a cavalry general in 1896, he commanded the Caucasus Army Corps from 1893 until 1897 when he was assigned to the chief headquarters of the Caucasus Military District, sometimes acting as a de facto commander-in-chief of the Caucasus army. In 1901, on the 200th anniversary of the Nizhny Novgorod Dragoon Regiment, he became an adjutant general. In 1904, he served as an acting governor-general of Baku and used his influence and prestige to pacify the disturbances in the city.

He was decorated with numerous Russian and foreign awards, including the imperial orders of St. George, St. Vladimir, St. Anna, St. Alexander Nevsky and of St. Stanislav. He died in his native Chala in 1905 and was interred at the Kashveti Church in downtown Tbilisi.

Ivane Amilakhvari's grandson was Prince Dimitri Amilakhvari, a French hero of World War II.
