= Gozdno, Lubusz Voivodeship =

Gozdno
- Village
- Location within Poland
- Coordinates: 51°50′44″N 14°59′18″E
- Country: Poland
- Voivodeship: Lubusz
- County: Żary
- Gmina: Lubsko
- Population: 59

Gozdno [ˈɡɔzdnɔ] is a village in the administrative district of Gmina Lubsko, within Żary County, Lubusz Voivodeship, in western Poland.
