= Mierków =

- Village
- Location within Poland
- Coordinates: 51°48′5″N 14°54′51″E
- Country: Poland
- Voivodeship: Lubusz
- County: Żary
- Gmina: Lubsko
- Elevation: 64.5 m (212 ft)
- Population: 310

Mierków [ˈmjɛrkuf] (Lower Sorbian: Měrkow) is a village in the administrative district of Gmina Lubsko, within Żary County, Lubusz Voivodeship, in western Poland.
