= Białków, Żary County =

Białków
- Village
- Location within Poland
- Coordinates: 51°46′57″N 15°1′16″E
- Country: Poland
- Voivodeship: Lubusz
- County: Żary
- Gmina: Lubsko
- Population: 345

Białków ([ˈbjau̯kuf]; Lower Sorbian: Proteine) is a village in the administrative district of Gmina Lubsko, within Żary County, Lubusz Voivodeship, in western Poland.
