= Gareja =

- Village
- Location within Poland
- Coordinates: 51°48′48″N 14°54′35″E
- Country: Poland
- Voivodeship: Lubusz
- County: Żary
- Gmina: Lubsko

Gareja [ɡaˈrɛja] (Upper Sorbian: Kóśel) is a village in the administrative district of Gmina Lubsko, in Żary County, Lubusz Voivodeship, in western Poland.
