= Dłużek, Lubusz Voivodeship =

Dłużek
- Village
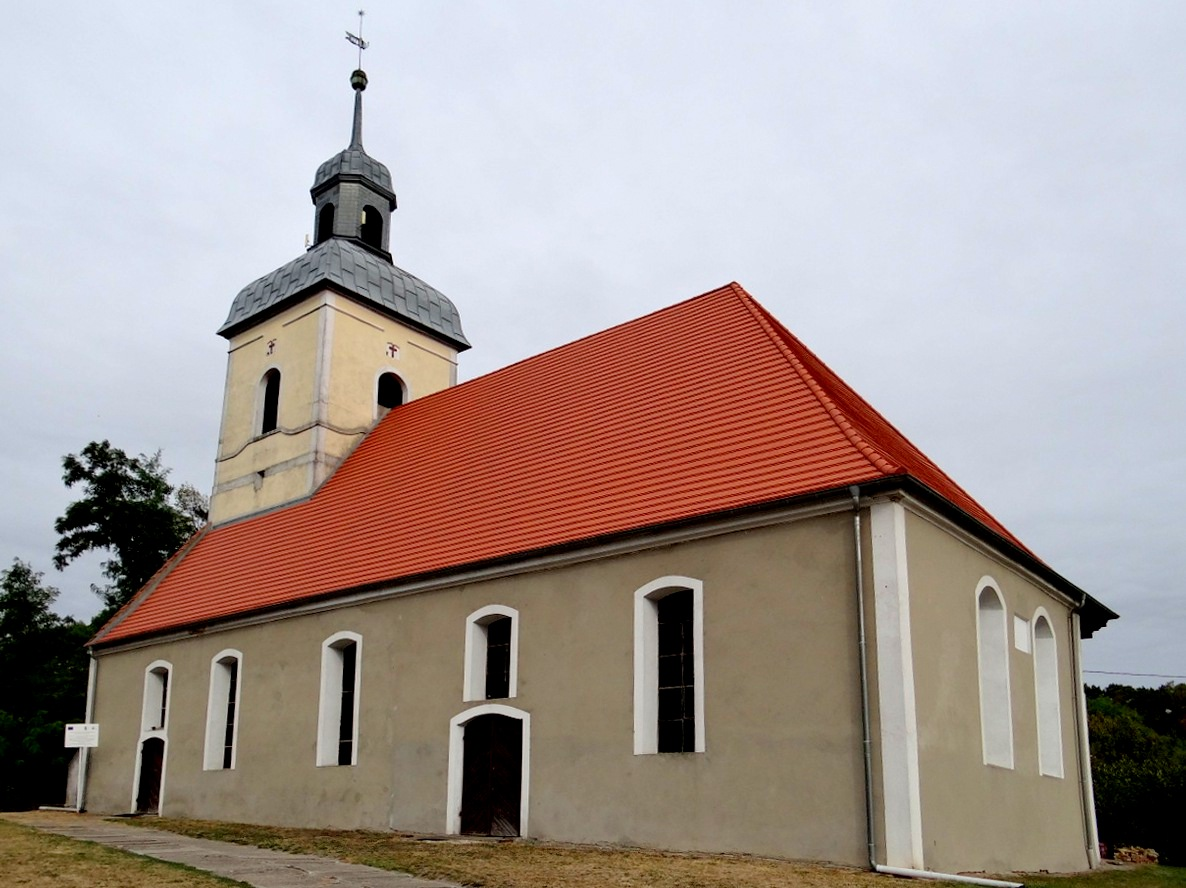
- Catholic Church, 14th century

- Location within Poland
- Coordinates: 51°46′11″N 14°55′53″E
- Country: Poland
- Voivodeship: Lubusz
- County: Żary
- Gmina: Lubsko
- Elevation: 114.5 m (376 ft)
- Population: 347

Dłużek [ˈdwuʐɛk] (Upper Sorbian: Dłužek, German: Dolzig) is a village in the administrative district of Gmina Lubsko, within Żary County, Lubusz Voivodeship, in western Poland. It is home to the Dolzig Palace.

== Notable residents ==
- Ernst Günther, Duke of Schleswig-Holstein (1863-1921)
- Augusta Victoria of Schleswig-Holstein (1858-1921), last German Empress
