= House of Torment =

Former headquarters of the State Police Commissariat in Rypin, Poland

- Muzeum Ziemi Dobrzyńskiej
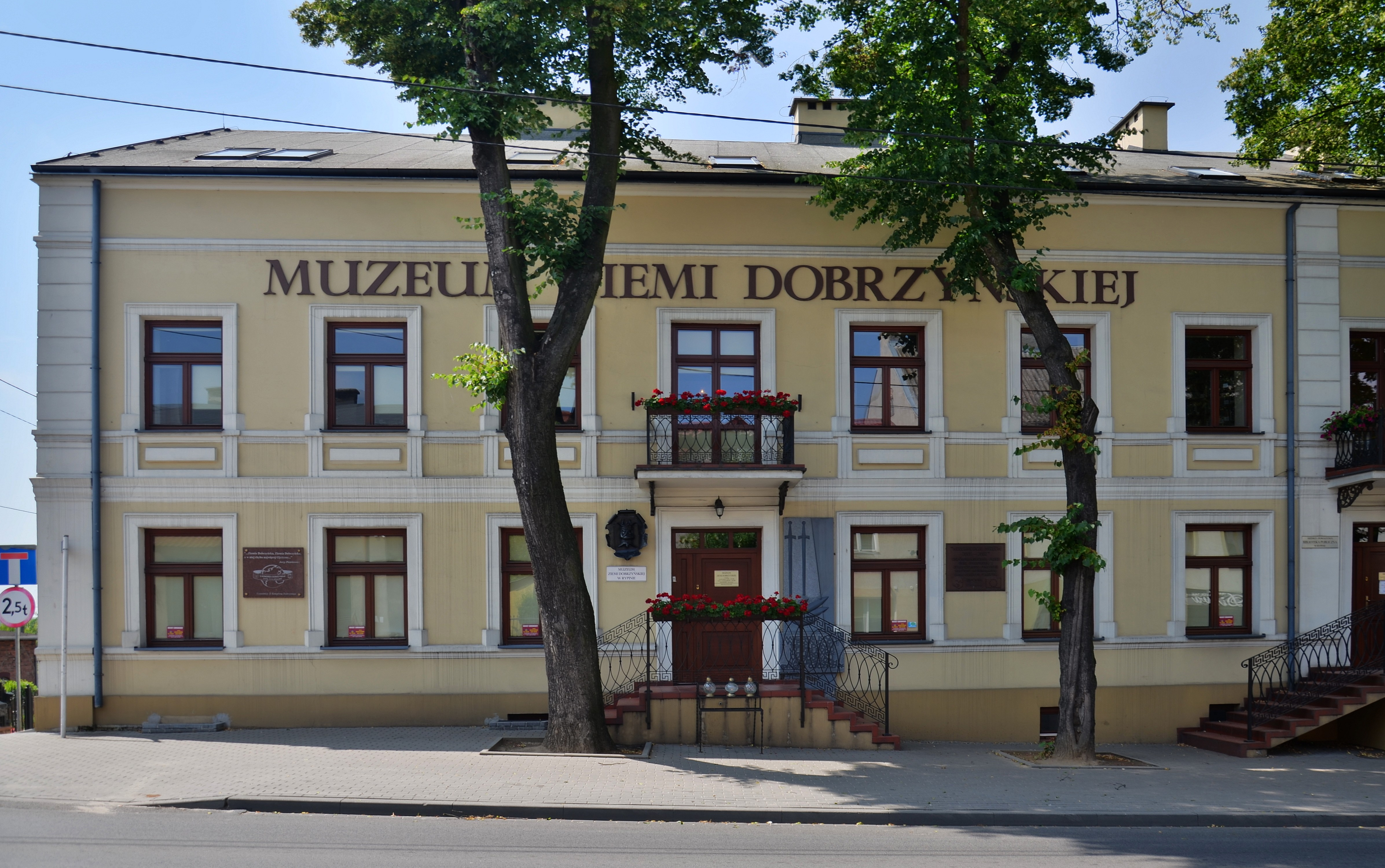

- Location within Poland
- Location: Rypin, Poland
- Coordinates: 53°03′51″N 19°24′36″E
- Collections: Historical and archaeological artifacts

House of Torment
- Part of Intelligenzaktion
- Target: Poles and Jews
- Attack type: mass shooting
- Deaths: 1,450–2,000 people
- Perpetrators: Volksdeutscher Selbstschutz, Gestapo
- Motive: Anti-Polish sentiment, Antisemitism, expansionism

The House of Torment is the former headquarters of the State Police Commissariat in Rypin, where, in the early months of the German occupation of Poland, members of the paramilitary Volksdeutscher Selbstschutz and Gestapo officers detained, tortured, and murdered the residents of the Dobrzyń Land. In the autumn of 1939, over 1,000 Poles and Jews passed through the basement of the building at 20 Warszawska Street, most of whom were murdered within the building or in the nearby Skrwilno and Rusinowo forests. The building now houses the Museum of the Dobrzyń Land.

== Seizure of power by Selbstschutz ==
Rypin was occupied by Wehrmacht units on 7 September 1939. The German police, state, and party authorities quickly established themselves in the occupied city. The position of Landrat for the Rypin County was taken by a man named Borman, who was sent from Gdańsk. However, he was soon dismissed, allegedly due to his reluctance to take drastic repressive actions against the local population. Borman was replaced by Georg Will, a protégé of the Gdańsk Nazi Party Gauleiter Albert Forster, who also assumed the role of head of the county party organization (kreisleiter). A small Gestapo office was established in the former Polish state police headquarters on 20 Warszawska Street, led by a man named Schultz.

Before the war, Rypin County was home to 8,712 ethnic Germans, making up 9.7% of the total population of the county (as of 1 January 1935). Many Rypin Germans were involved in pro-Hitler groups, such as the Jungdeutsche Partei, and even in sabotage or espionage activities. After the Wehrmacht took control of the Dobrzyń Land, representatives of the German minority actively supported the actions of the occupying authorities. Many joined the Selbstschutz, a paramilitary formation made up of Volksdeutsche living in the lands of pre-war Poland. Selbstschutz played a key role in the extermination efforts carried out by the Nazis in the Dobrzyń Land.

In mid-September 1939, Herman Kniefall, an SS officer, arrived in Rypin, sent from Brodnica with the task of organizing the Selbstschutz structures in Rypin County. Kniefall, aided by many local Germans, quickly built a strong and efficient Selbstschutz organization. Soon, several hundred men from the Rypin County were serving in the "Volksdeutsche Self-Defence", with around 50 based in Rypin itself. The deputy and de facto right-hand man of Kniefall was 33-year-old August Nikolai, a teacher from the village of Somsiory, who was married to a Polish woman. Other notable members of the Selbstschutz from the local population included Heinrich Schlieske, Henryk Szramowski, the brothers Edward, Johann, and Richard Rotenberg (formerly Czerwiński), Fryderyk and Henryk Gramze (father and son), Otto Bendlin, Edmund Gogolin, Albert Nickel, and the Ukrainian Vasily Alexeyev. Mirosław Krajewski suggests that the spiritual leader of the Rypin Germans, Pastor Waldemar Krusche, was the instigator of many of the anti-Polish actions, although other sources indicate that Krusche was arrested and deported by Polish authorities in early September 1939 and did not return to Rypin.

In October 1939, Rypin County was incorporated into the Reich as part of the Kwidzyn District of the Reichsgau Danzig-West Prussia region. Reichsstatthalter Albert Forster initially opposed the inclusion of the two Dobrzyń Land counties (Lipno and Rypin) in his province, as he believed the Polish population living there was not predisposed to Germanization (Lipno and Rypin had belonged to the Russian Partition before 1918). Ultimately, however, the authorities of the Third Reich decided to annex the Dobrzyń Land, and Forster was granted consent to incorporate six western counties of East Prussia into the Reichsgau Danzig-West Prussia region.

== Early occupier repressions ==
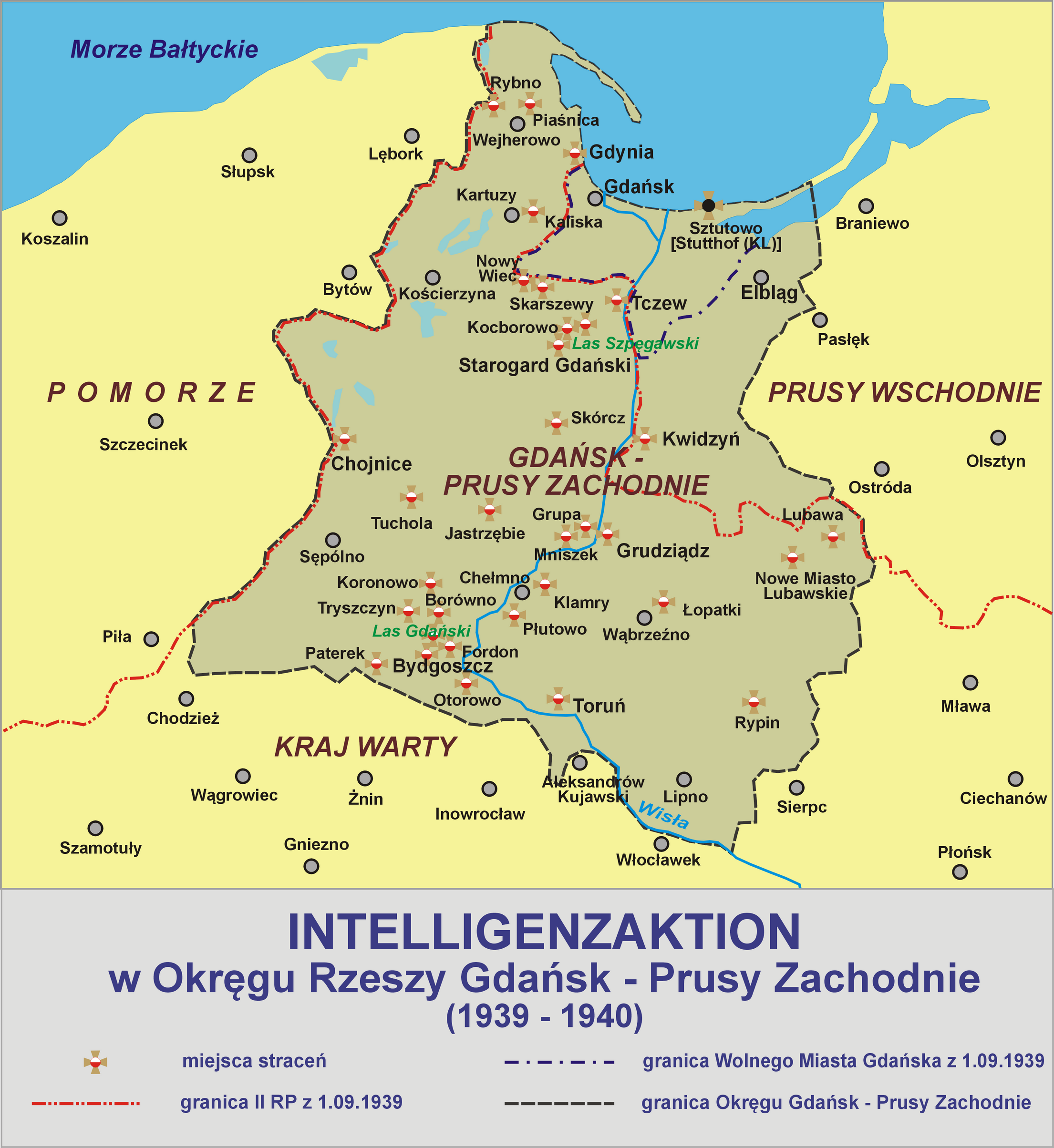
Intelligenzaktion in the Reichsgau Danzig-West Prussia region

In Rypin County, as across the Dobrzyń Land, the occupiers swiftly initiated a crackdown on the Polish and Jewish populations. The German repressions primarily targeted the Polish social and intellectual elite, viewed by the Nazis as the main obstacle to the rapid and total Germanization of the region. Local Germans exploited this opportunity to settle long-standing neighborly disputes and to seize the property of murdered Poles and Jews. These murders and arrests were part of the broader extermination campaign carried out in the autumn of 1939 in the occupied territories of Gdańsk Pomerania. Under the so-called Intelligenzaktion, the Germans murdered between 30,000 and 40,000 residents of the region.

On 8 September 1939, the Germans conducted brutal searches in Jewish homes in Rypin. Two days later, all Jewish men were summoned to assemble in front of the unfinished school building. From those gathered, a group of men aged from 18 to 30 was selected and forced to work on the school's construction. Many individuals were severely beaten. On September 17, the Germans set fire to the synagogue and beth midrash, later arresting the qahal leader, Szymon Kohn, initially accusing him of arson and later of negligence causing the fire. The Jews were forced to clear the debris and were subjected to a fine of 30,000 PLN. In October 1939, the Germans established a 12-member Judenrat (composed of the Jewish elite of the town), whose members were soon arrested and severely beaten. The group was only released after paying a ransom. By mid-November 1939, most of Rypin's Jews who had not been executed in mass shootings during the autumn were expelled from the town.

Poles also faced severe repression. Michał Cezak, the school inspector in Rypin, was compelled in early October 1939 to hand over his duties to a German inspector named Woywod. Polish teachers were evicted from their official residences under false promises that they could retain their jobs. On October 21, teachers were summoned to the Rypin County Office for an educational conference allegedly related to preparations for the new school year. This supposed conference turned out to be a trap, as dozens of teachers were immediately imprisoned by the Germans. Arrests of teachers continued over the following days, resulting in a total of 96 detainees, most identified by Nikolai and other Selbstschutz members.

Mass arrests also targeted other members of the Polish leadership class, including landed gentry, civil servants, lawyers, doctors, students, members of Polish cultural organizations, farmers, and workers. Even secondary school students were among the arrested. Between October 20 and 22, eighteen Catholic priests were detained in Rypin County.

The arrested Poles and Jews were primarily confined in the basement of the former police station at 20 Warszawska Street, which served as the headquarters of the local Selbstschutz and the Rypin Gestapo. This building soon became infamous among the Polish population as the "House of Torment".

== Atrocities in the "House of Torment" ==
The cellars of the so-called "House of Torment" housed not only residents of Rypin County but also detainees transported from Brodnica, Grudziądz, Lipno, Lubawa, Mława, and Wąbrzeźno. Among them were clergy from the Diocese of Chełmno, brought there in late October and later sent to the transitional camp for priests in Obory.

Polish and Jewish prisoners in the "House of Torment" suffered unimaginable brutality at the hands of the Selbstschutz. Torture, beatings, and atrocities were a daily occurrence. Herman Kniefall, the local Selbstschutz leader, reportedly took sadistic pleasure in whipping prisoners over a barrel. Dogs were unleashed on detainees, nails were driven into their backs, and their mouths were filled with plaster. Infants were reportedly killed by smashing their heads against walls. Women endured sexual violence, and witnesses recounted that the worst moments occurred at night, when drunken Selbstschutz members would beat and torture prisoners. Screams, the sound of whips, and gunshots echoed through the night. It was even said that two nights were relatively calm because one of the executioners had worn out his hands from killing prisoners.

Particularly heinous was the murder of Stanisław Sierakowski, a prewar president of the Union of Poles in Germany. He was savagely beaten, doused with waste, and ultimately killed by Kniefall, who stabbed him in the eye. Sierakowski's wife, Helena, an activist for the Union of Poles in Germany, was also murdered. Their daughter, Teresa "Renia" Gniazdowska, who was heavily pregnant at the time, was executed with a gunshot to the back of the head by Heinrich Schlieske. Others killed in the cellars of the "House of Torment" included Michał Cezak, a school inspector, and Wacław Malanowski, the headmaster of Public School No. 1 in Rypin.

In addition to the tortures, the Selbstschutz carried out mass executions in the courtyard of the "House of Torment". On 31 October 1939, a group of Jewish men, numbering up to 100, was executed alongside 200 prisoners transported from Brodnica. On the night of November 2–3, a large group of teachers was executed. After each execution, traces of blood in the courtyard were covered with sand and swept into a garbage container. Vasily Alexeyev removed gold teeth from the murdered victims, and these, along with other valuables taken from the deceased, were deposited in Kniefall's office. The bodies of those executed were buried in nearby Rusinowo or Skrwilno forests. Jewish prisoners were often forced to dig the graves, only to be murdered themselves afterward.

Those not killed on-site were transported to isolated locations near Rypin and executed. The Skrwilno forests, particularly near the village of Rak, became the site of the largest massacres. Between October 15 and 15 November 1939, Selbstschutz killed at least several hundred victims from Rypin, Brodnica, Wąbrzeźno, and other towns. Victims were buried in mass graves, some as large as 5 by 3 meters. Notable victims included 12 members of the Rypin Judenrat and 50 scouts from Grudziądz. The victims were transported to the execution sites in trucks covered with tarpaulins. Sometimes, their hands were tied with barbed wire. According to witness testimonies, the Germans tortured the condemned before the executions. The prisoners were usually shot with machine guns in a manner that caused their bodies to fall directly into pre-dug graves. After the executions, Selbstschutz members often held drinking feasts in the nearby village of Skrwilno.

Additionally, in mid-October 1939, members of the Selbstschutz executed a number of Poles and Jews at the sports field in Rypin and at the local Jewish cemetery. Around 200 residents of Rypin County were also murdered in the Rusinowo forests.

== Victims ==
Mass crimes at the "House of Torment" and in the nearby forests primarily occurred in October and November 1939. It is difficult to determine precisely how many Poles and Jews were murdered during that period, as in August 1944 – with the Red Army approaching – the Germans began erasing evidence of their crimes. Bodies of the victims buried in the Skrwilno forests were exhumed and burned. The Germans used a group of 12 Soviet prisoners of war for the exhumation and burning process, housing them in a firewood shed near the school in Skrwilno. The operation to conceal evidence lasted until the end of August. The stench of burning bodies constantly reached the nearby villages. Once the task was completed, the Soviet prisoners were murdered.

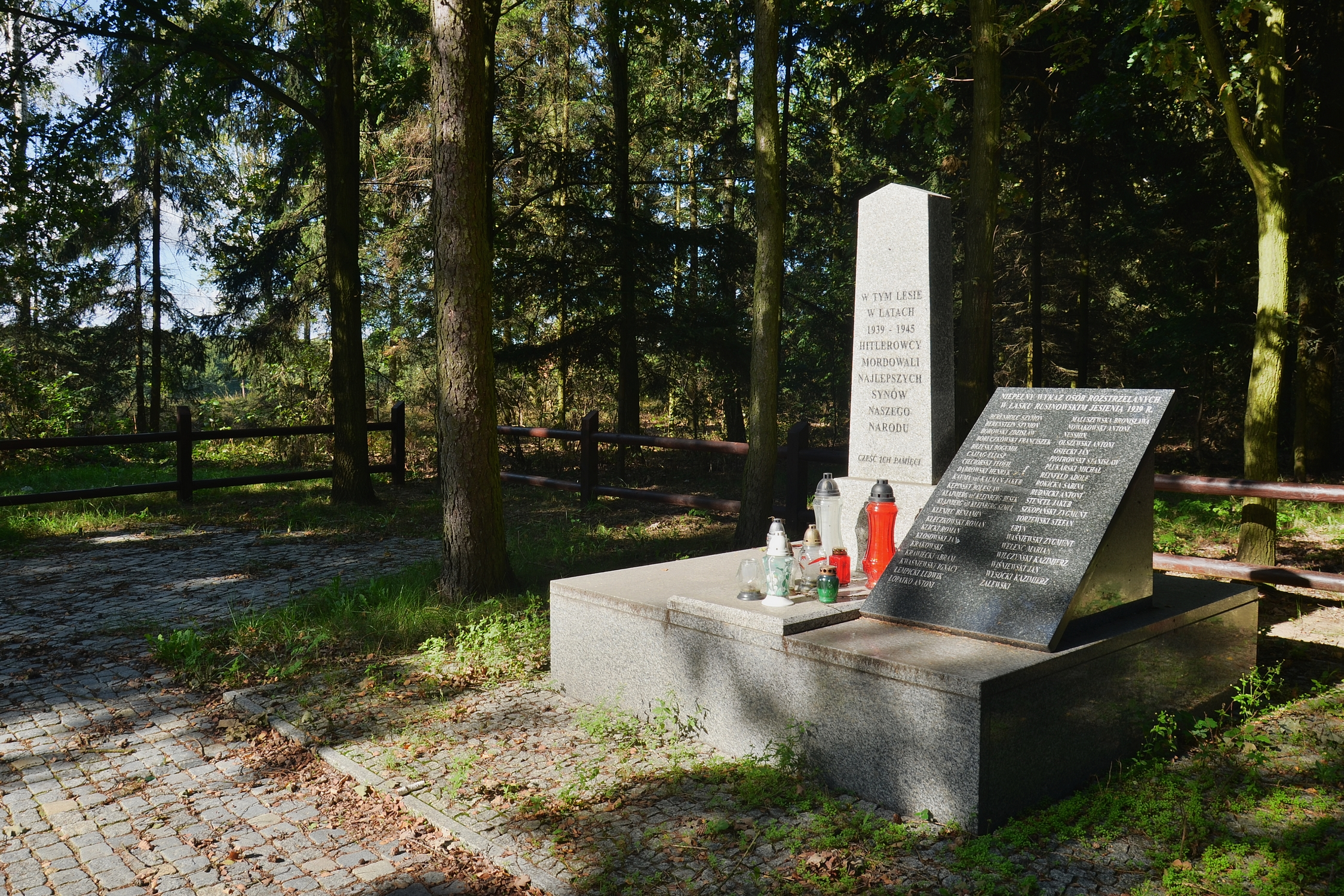
Rusinowo forest grove, memorial to the victims

Mirosław Krajewski estimated that approximately 1,100 prisoners passed through the "House of Torment" in October and November 1939, while the number of those murdered or buried in the Skrwilno forests reached about 1,450. Maria Wardzyńska assessed that several hundred Poles and Jews were murdered at both locations, with an additional 200 victims in the Rusinowo forests and an undetermined number of victims executed at the sports field and Jewish cemetery in Rypin. Some sources suggest that up to 2,000 residents of Rypin County may have fallen victim to German occupiers during the autumn of 1939.

None of the members of the Rypin Selbstschutz were brought to justice for the crimes committed in the autumn of 1939.

== Remembrance ==
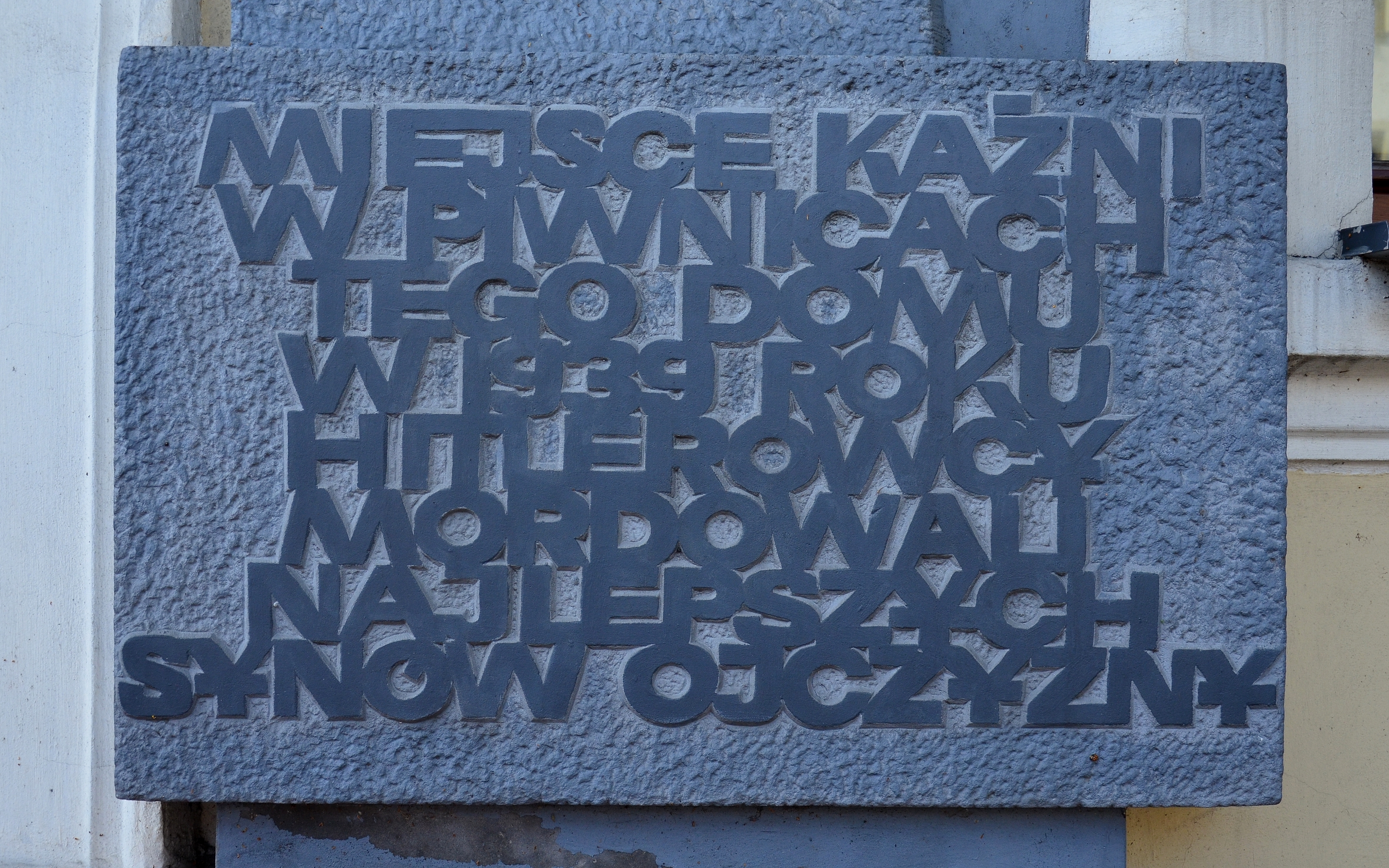
Memorial plaque on the museum wall

On 8 May 1968, at the initiative of Edward Koźmiński, Roman Piotrowski, and members of the Society of Lovers of the Rypin Region, a Regional Chamber of National Remembrance was established at the site of the former "House of Torment". It consisted of two exhibitions – one on martyrology and the other on archaeology. In 1980, the Chamber of National Remembrance was transformed into the Museum of the Dobrzyń Land, a branch of the Museum of Kuyavia and Dobrzyń Land in Włocławek. Commemorative plaques were placed on the walls of the "House of Torment" as well as at the execution sites in the Rusinowo and Skrwilno forests.

== Sources ==
- Krajewski, Mirosław (1995). W cieniu wojny i okupacji. Ziemia Dobrzyńska w latach 1939–1945 [In the Shadow of War and Occupation: The Dobrzyń Land in 1939–1945] (in Polish). Rypin: Dobrzyński Oddział Włocławskiego Towarzystwa Naukowego w Rypinie.
- Wardzyńska, Maria (2009). Był rok 1939. Operacja niemieckiej policji bezpieczeństwa w Polsce. Intelligenzaktion [It Was 1939: The German Security Police Operation in Poland. Intelligenzaktion] (in Polish). Warsaw: Instytut Pamięci Narodowej. ISBN 978-83-7629-063-8.
- Witkowski, Antoni (1986). Mordercy z Selbstschutzu [Murderers from Selbstschutz] (in Polish). Warsaw: MON. ISBN 83-11-07280-9.
