= Dobrzyń Land =

Historical region in Poland

Dobrzyń Land Ziemia dobrzyńska
- Historical region
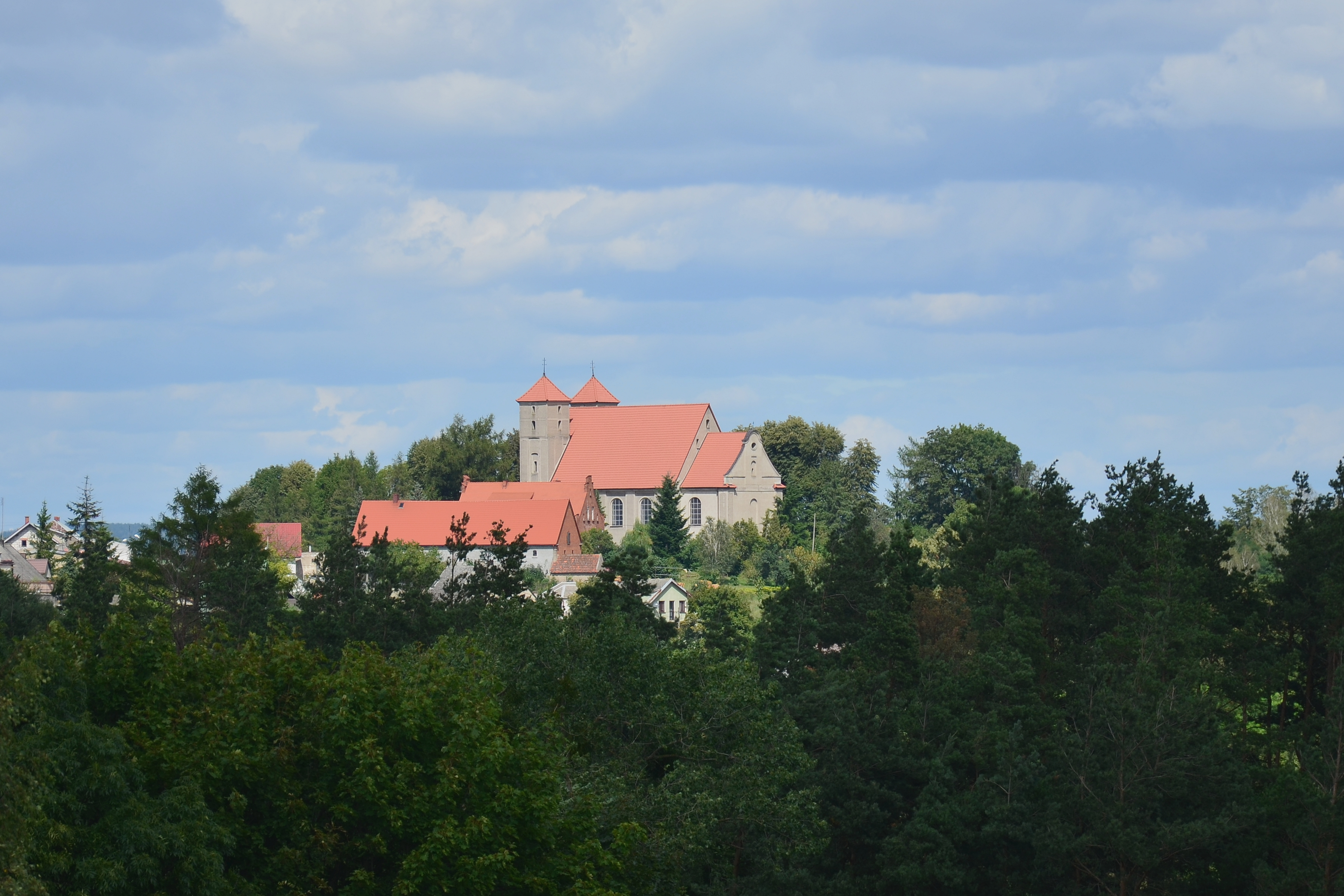
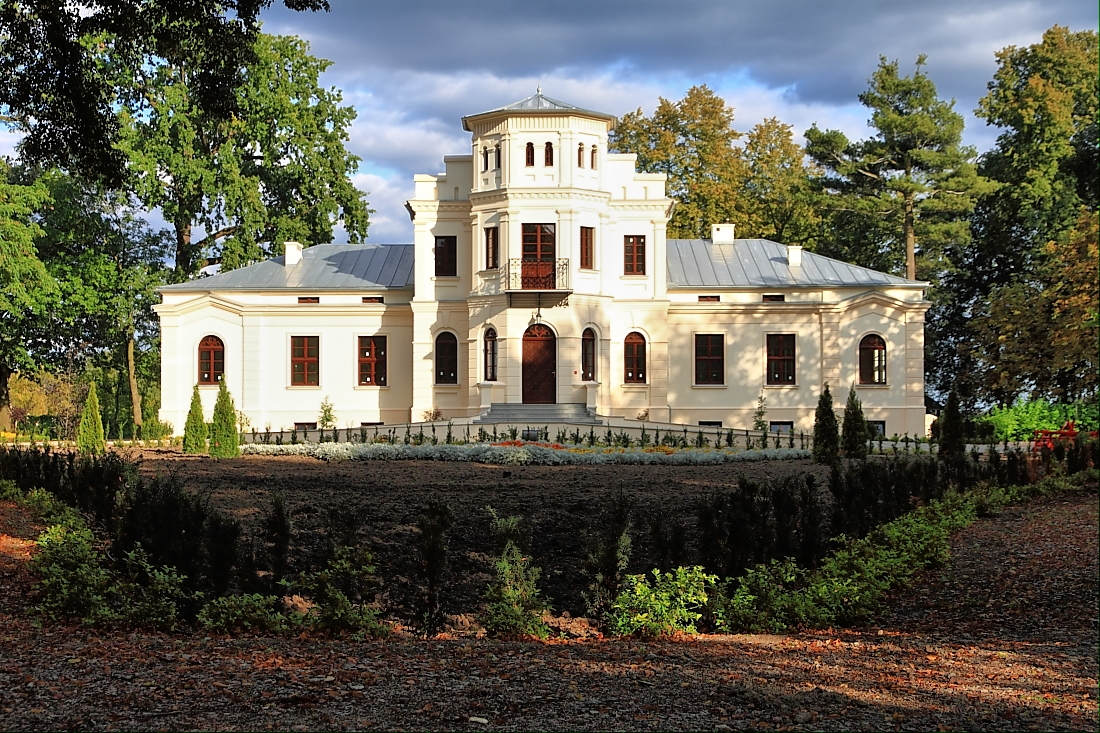
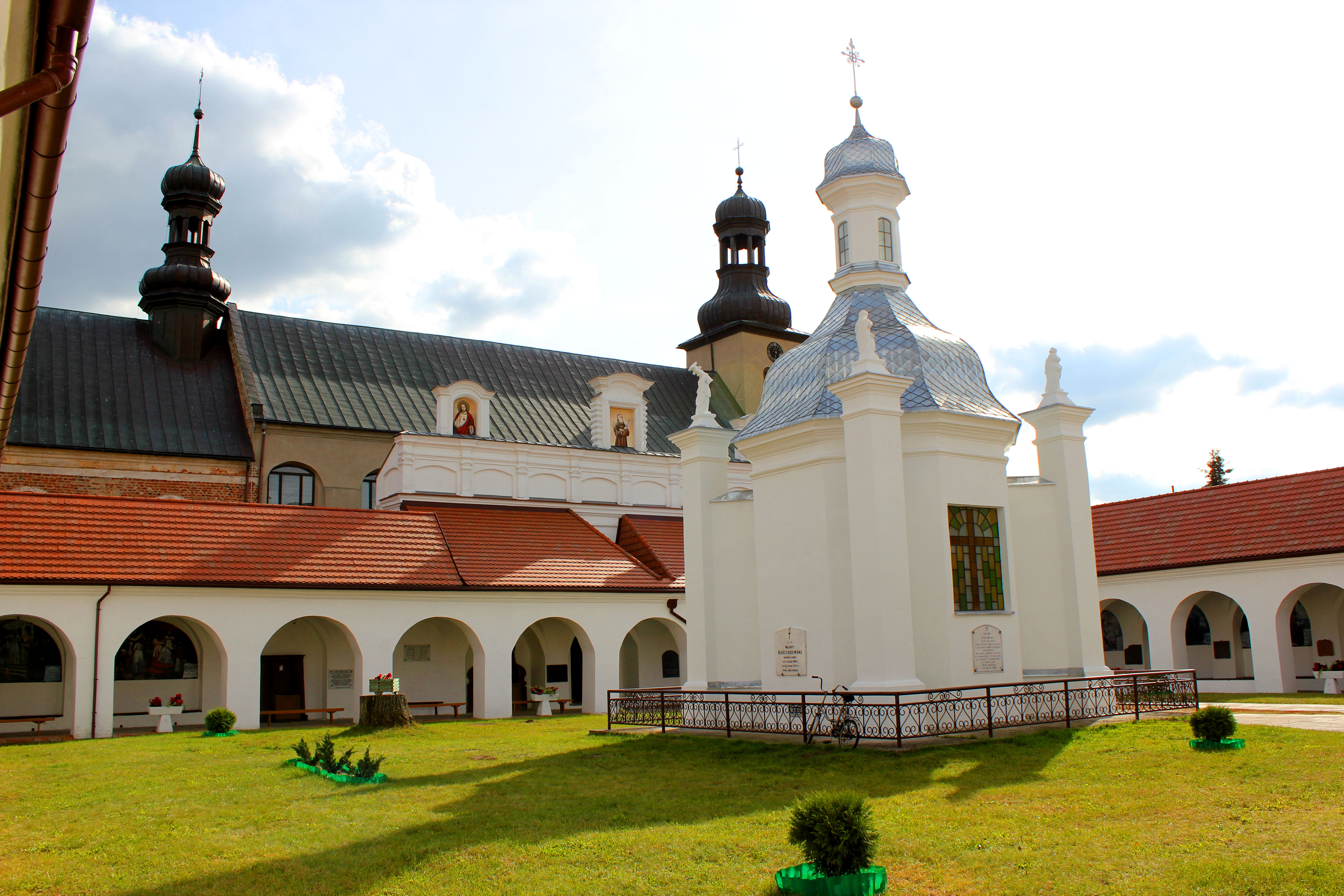
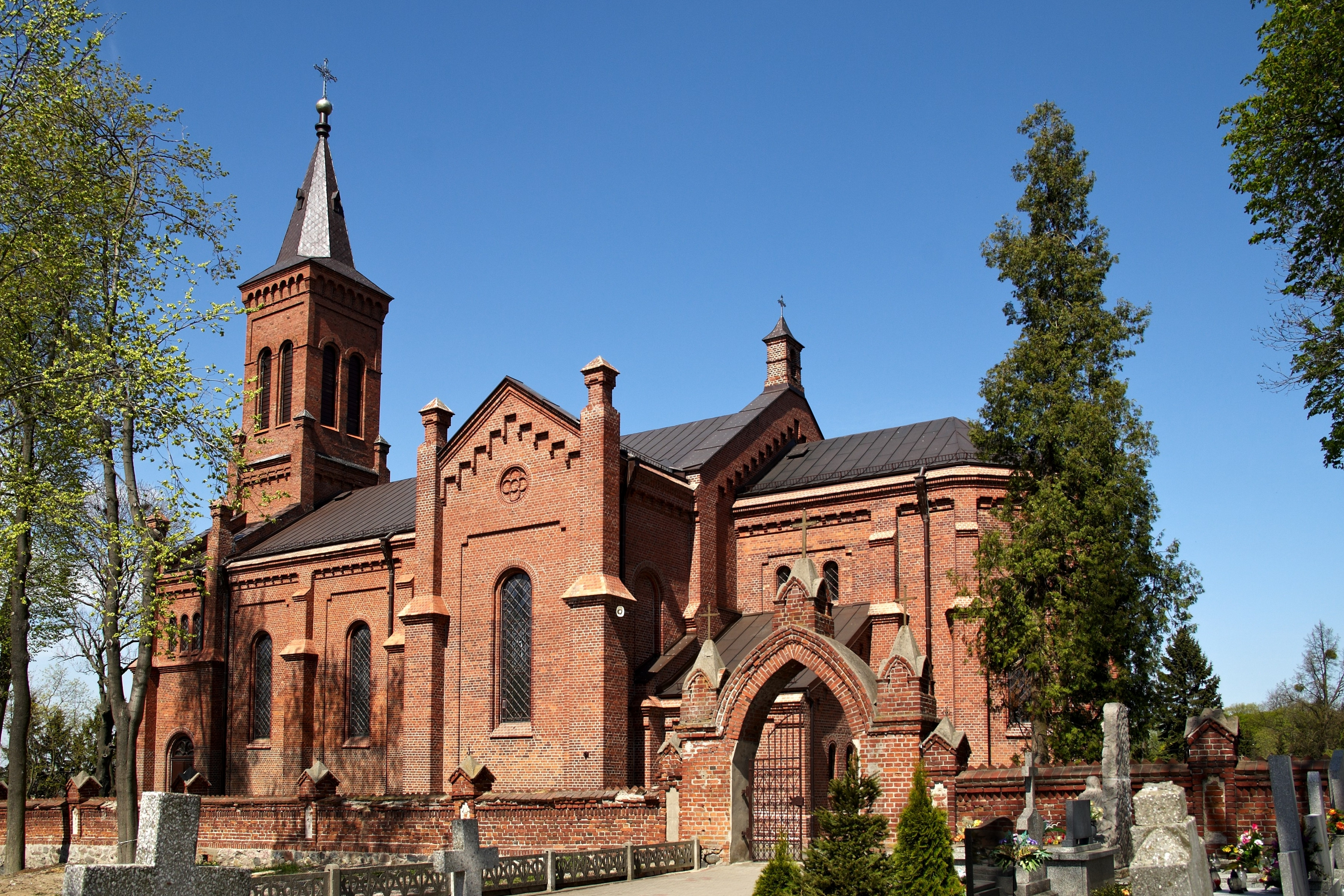
- From top, left to right: Górzno; Siemiątkowski Palace in Wąpielsk; Bernardine Monastery in Skępe; Saint Adalbert church in Kikół

- Coat of arms

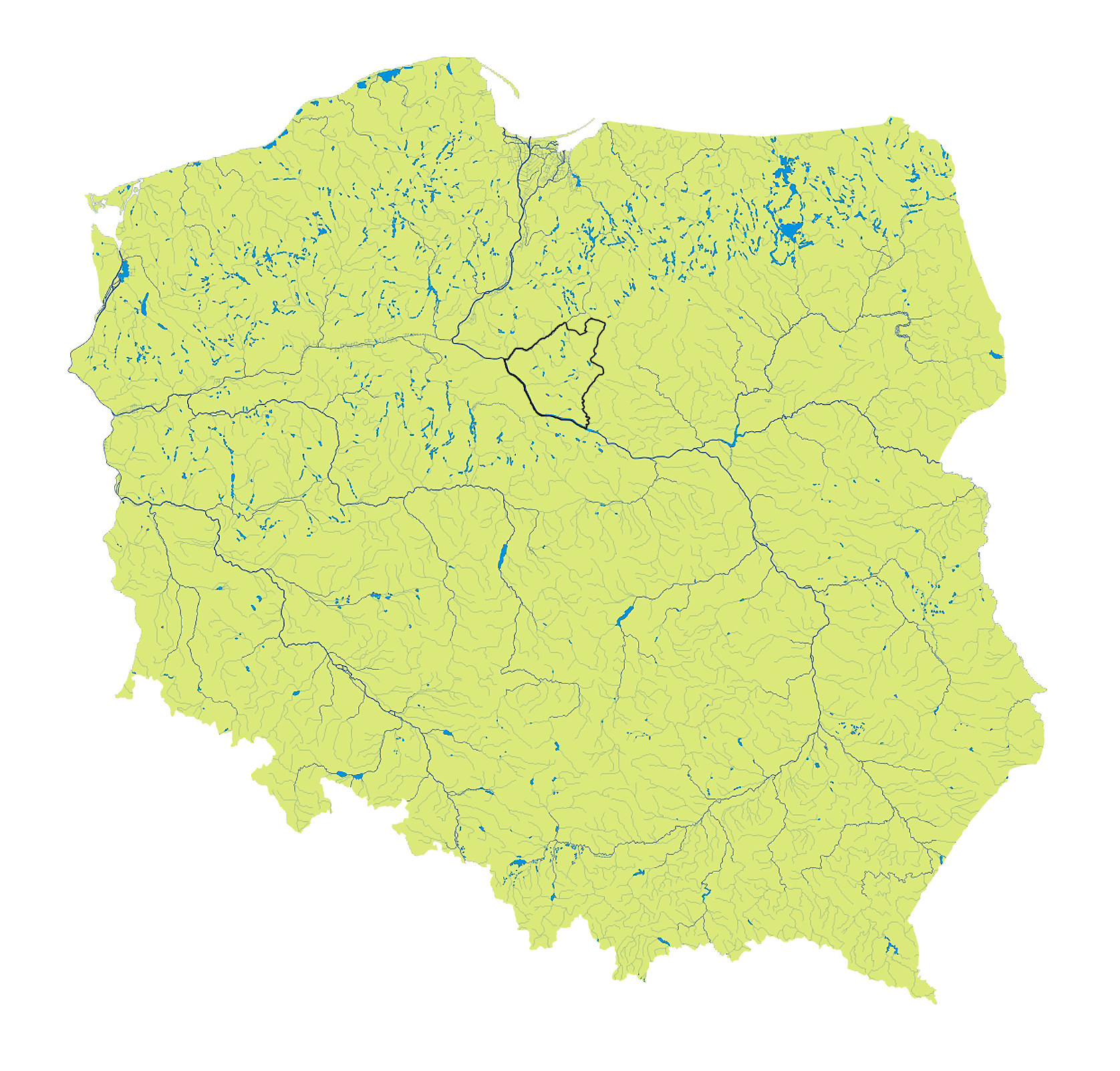
- Dobrzyń Land on the map of Poland
- Coordinates: 52°58′01″N 19°19′59″E
- Country: Poland
- Historical capital: Dobrzyń nad Wisłą
- Largest town: Rypin
- Time zone: UTC+1 (CET)
  - Summer (DST): UTC+2 (CEST)

Dobrzyń Land (Polish: ziemia dobrzyńska) is a historical region in central-northern Poland. It lies northeast of the Vistula River, south of the Drwęca, and west of the Skrwa. The territory approximately corresponds to the present-day powiats of Lipno, Rypin, and part of Golub-Dobrzyń within the Kuyavian-Pomeranian Voivodeship, although it encompasses parts of other counties as well. In total, it covers about 3,000 km^{2} and has 200,000 inhabitants. Its historic capital is Dobrzyń nad Wisłą, which gave its name to the entire region. Its largest town is Rypin.

== History ==
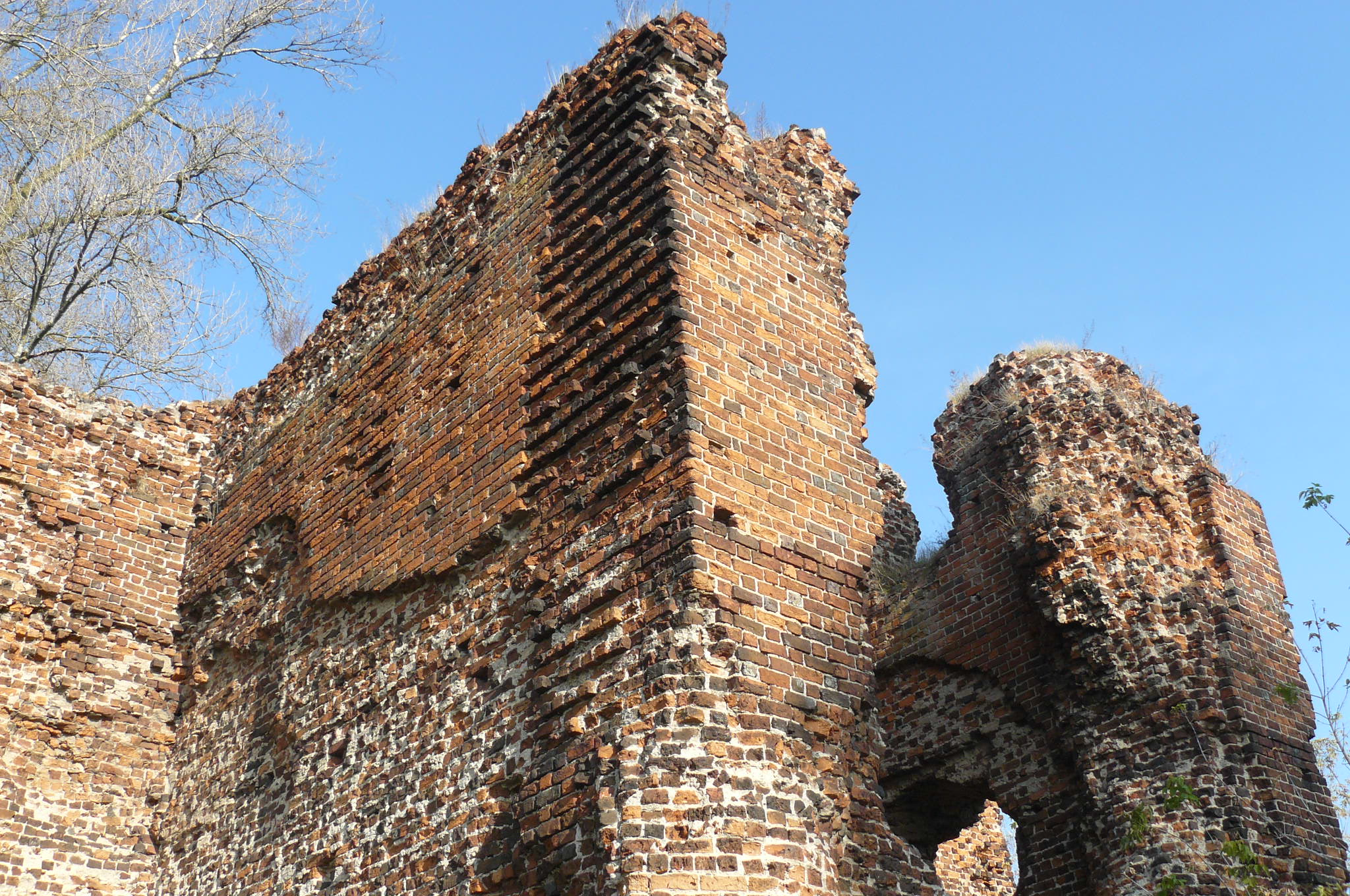
Ruins of the medieval Royal Castle in Złotoria

The region became part of the emerging Polish state under Duke Mieszko I of Poland (960–992). Upon the death of his descendant Duke Bolesław III Wrymouth in 1138, it was allocated to the newly established Duchy of Masovia, a provincial duchy of Poland. In his Prussian Crusade, Duke Konrad I of Masovia, in 1228, established the Order of Dobrzyń of German knights (fratribus militiae Christi in Prussia), whom he vested with the Dobrzyń estates. Soon after, however, this order was absorbed by the Teutonic Knights, who had established the Order's State in the adjacent Chełmno Land (Prussian land). During the whole second half of the 13th century it belonged to the Kuyavian Piasts, the new branch of the Mazovian dynasty. Finally, along with their other states, it became part of the reunited Kingdom of Poland.

During the Polish–Teutonic War of 1326–1332, the forces of the Order's State occupied Dobrzyń Land, which, however, was relinquished to the Kingdom of Poland in the 1343 Treaty of Kalisz. The knights temporarily regained control in the Polish–Lithuanian–Teutonic War of 1409–1411, but after their defeat at the Battle of Grunwald they had to return it again according to the Peace of Thorn. It was incorporated into the Inowrocław Voivodeship of the Greater Poland Province of the Polish Crown and the Polish–Lithuanian Commonwealth. Nevertheless, it remained in the Mazovian Diocese of Płock and not in the Greater Polish Diocese of Włocławek.

Dobrzyń Land was annexed by Prussia during the Second Partition in 1793 and included within the newly formed province of South Prussia. It was administered with New East Prussia from 1795 onwards until, in 1807, it became part of the Napoleonic Duchy of Warsaw according to the Treaties of Tilsit. In 1815, however, following the duchy's dissolution, it was attached to so-called Congress Poland under the Russian Empire. After World War I, in 1918, Dobrzyń Land passed to the re-established, independent Second Polish Republic. In 1920, Poland repulsed a Soviet invasion of the region.

Following the joint German–Soviet invasion of Poland, which started World War II in September 1939, it was occupied by Nazi Germany. During the occupation, the Polish population was subjected to various crimes, such as mass arrests, imprisonment, slave labor, kidnapping of children, deportations to Nazi concentration camps, and extermination, including the Intelligenzaktion. Major sites of massacres of Poles in the region included Skrwilno, Rusinowo, Karnkowo, and Rypin. In 1945, the German occupation ended and the region was restored to Poland.

== Miscellanea ==
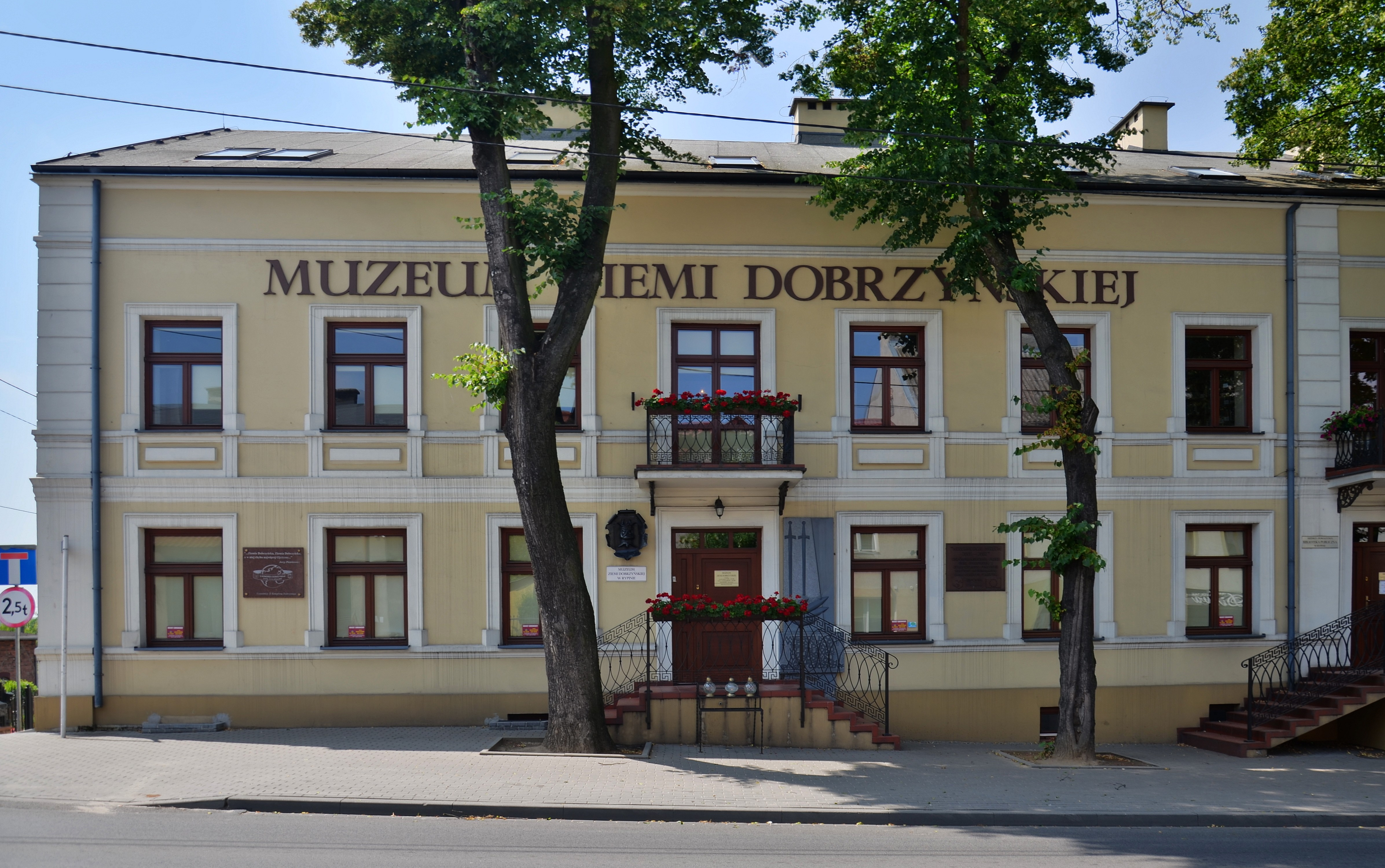
Museum of Dobrzyń Land in Rypin, the largest town of the region

The region has numerous lakes and descendants of yeomanry (drobna szlachta, similar to Mazovia); thus, there are multiple palaces and historic manor houses. There are eight towns in the region: Bobrowniki, Golub-Dobrzyń, Górzno, Kikół, Lipno, Skępe, Rypin, and the historic capital Dobrzyń nad Wisłą. The cities of Toruń and Włocławek, as well as the towns of Ciechocinek and Sierpc, lie just beyond its border. Its oldest officially crowned sanctuary of Our Lady is in Skępe; another is in Obory. Ecclesiastically, it is divided between the dioceses of Włocławek and Płock. After 1793, it was part of administrative units with capitals in Płock and Warsaw; since 1938 it has belonged to Toruń and Włocławek. Dialectologically, it is usually adjoined to Chełmno Land. Therefore, it is considered a transitory subregion between the three neighbouring regions of Kuyavia, Mazovia, and Chełmno Land, with which it had close historical ties at various times.

In Szafarnia there is a historic manor house where Fryderyk Chopin stayed during his 1824 and 1825 summer vacations; it now hosts a museum dedicated to the composer. There are ruins of medieval castles in Złotoria and Bobrowniki.

== See also ==
- Ziemia
- Chełmno Land
- Kuyavia
- House of Torment
