= Gmina Skrwilno =

Gmina Skrwilno Skrwilno Commune
- Gmina
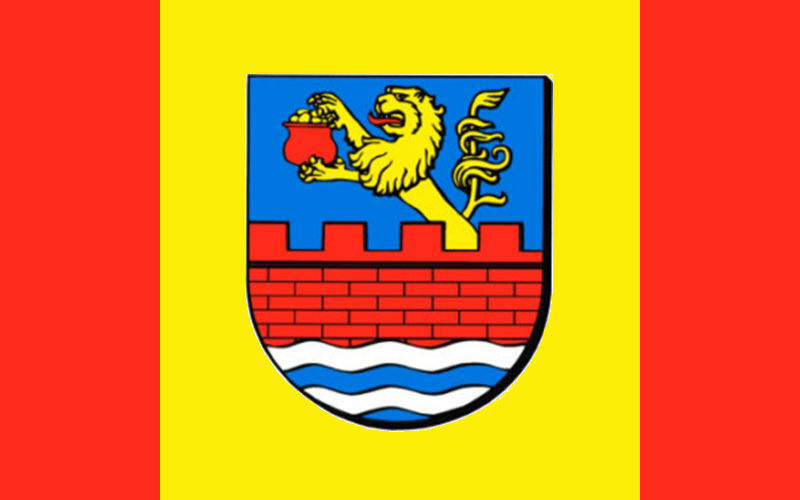
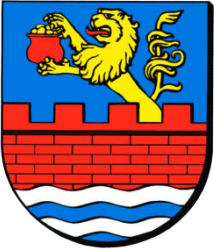
- Flag Coat of arms
- Interactive map of Gmina Skrwilno
- Coordinates (Skrwilno): 53°1′N 19°36′E
- Country: Poland
- Voivodeship: Kuyavian-Pomeranian
- County: Rypin
- Seat: Skrwilno

Area
  - Total: 124.35 km^{2} (48.01 sq mi)

Population (2006)
  - Total: 6,109
  - Density: 49.13/km^{2} (127.2/sq mi)
- Website: http://www.skrwilno.lo.pl

Gmina Skrwilno is a rural gmina (administrative district) in Rypin County, Kuyavian-Pomeranian Voivodeship, in north-central Poland. Its seat is the village of Skrwilno, which lies approximately 12 kilometres (7 mi) south-east of Rypin and 66 km (41 mi) east of Toruń.

The gmina covers an area of 124.35 square kilometres (48.0 sq mi), and as of 2006 its total population is 6,109.

== Villages ==
Gmina Skrwilno contains the villages and settlements of Baba, Borki, Budziska, Czarnia Duża, Czarnia Mała, Kotowy, Mościska, Nowe Skudzawy, Okalewo, Otocznia, Przywitowo, Rak, Ruda, Skrwilno, Skudzawy, Szczawno, Szucie, Szustek, Urszulewo, Wólka, Zambrzyca and Zofiewo.

== Neighbouring gminas ==
Gmina Skrwilno is bordered by the gminas of Lubowidz, Lutocin, Rogowo, Rościszewo, Rypin, Świedziebnia and Szczutowo.
