= Szczawno =

Szczawno may refer to the following places:

- Szczawno, Kuyavian-Pomeranian Voivodeship (north-central Poland)
- Szczawno, Łódź Voivodeship (central Poland)
- Szczawno, Lubusz Voivodeship (west Poland)
- Szczawno, West Pomeranian Voivodeship (north-west Poland)
