= Skudzawy =

- Village
- Location within Poland
- Coordinates: 53°00′33″N 19°31′50″E
- Country: Poland
- Voivodeship: Kuyavian-Pomeranian
- County: Rypin
- Gmina: Skrwilno
- Time zone: UTC+1 (CET)
  - Summer (DST): UTC+2 (CEST)
- Vehicle registration: CRY

Skudzawy [skuˈd͡zavɨ] is a village in the administrative district of Gmina Skrwilno, within Rypin County, Kuyavian-Pomeranian Voivodeship, in north-central Poland.

== History ==
In 1827, Skudzawy had a population of 232.

During the German occupation of Poland (World War II), local school teachers were among the victims of large massacres of Poles from the region carried out by the Germans in nearby Skrwilno as part of the Intelligenzaktion.
