= Ruda, Gmina Skrwilno =

Ruda
- Village
- Location within Poland
- Coordinates: 53°0′24″N 19°35′32″E
- Country: Poland
- Voivodeship: Kuyavian-Pomeranian
- County: Rypin
- Gmina: Skrwilno

Ruda [ˈruda] is a village in the administrative district of Gmina Skrwilno, within Rypin County, Kuyavian-Pomeranian Voivodeship, in north-central Poland.
