= Nowe Skudzawy =

- Village
- Location within Poland
- Coordinates: 52°59′38″N 19°32′22″E
- Country: Poland
- Voivodeship: Kuyavian-Pomeranian
- County: Rypin
- Gmina: Skrwilno

Nowe Skudzawy [ˈnɔvɛ skuˈd͡zavɨ] is a village in the administrative district of Gmina Skrwilno, within Rypin County, Kuyavian-Pomeranian Voivodeship, in north-central Poland.
