= Czarnia Duża =

- Village
- Location within Poland
- Coordinates: 52°59′N 19°40′E
- Country: Poland
- Voivodeship: Kuyavian-Pomeranian
- County: Rypin
- Gmina: Skrwilno

Czarnia Duża [ˈt͡ʂarɲa ˈduʐa] is a village in the administrative district of Gmina Skrwilno, within Rypin County, Kuyavian-Pomeranian Voivodeship, in north-central Poland.
