= Budziska, Kuyavian-Pomeranian Voivodeship =

Budziska
- Village
- Location within Poland
- Coordinates: 53°2′27″N 19°34′40″E
- Country: Poland
- Voivodeship: Kuyavian-Pomeranian
- County: Rypin
- Gmina: Skrwilno

Budziska [buˈd͡ʑiska] is a village in the administrative district of Gmina Skrwilno, within Rypin County, Kuyavian-Pomeranian Voivodeship, in north-central Poland.
