= Urszulewo =

- Village
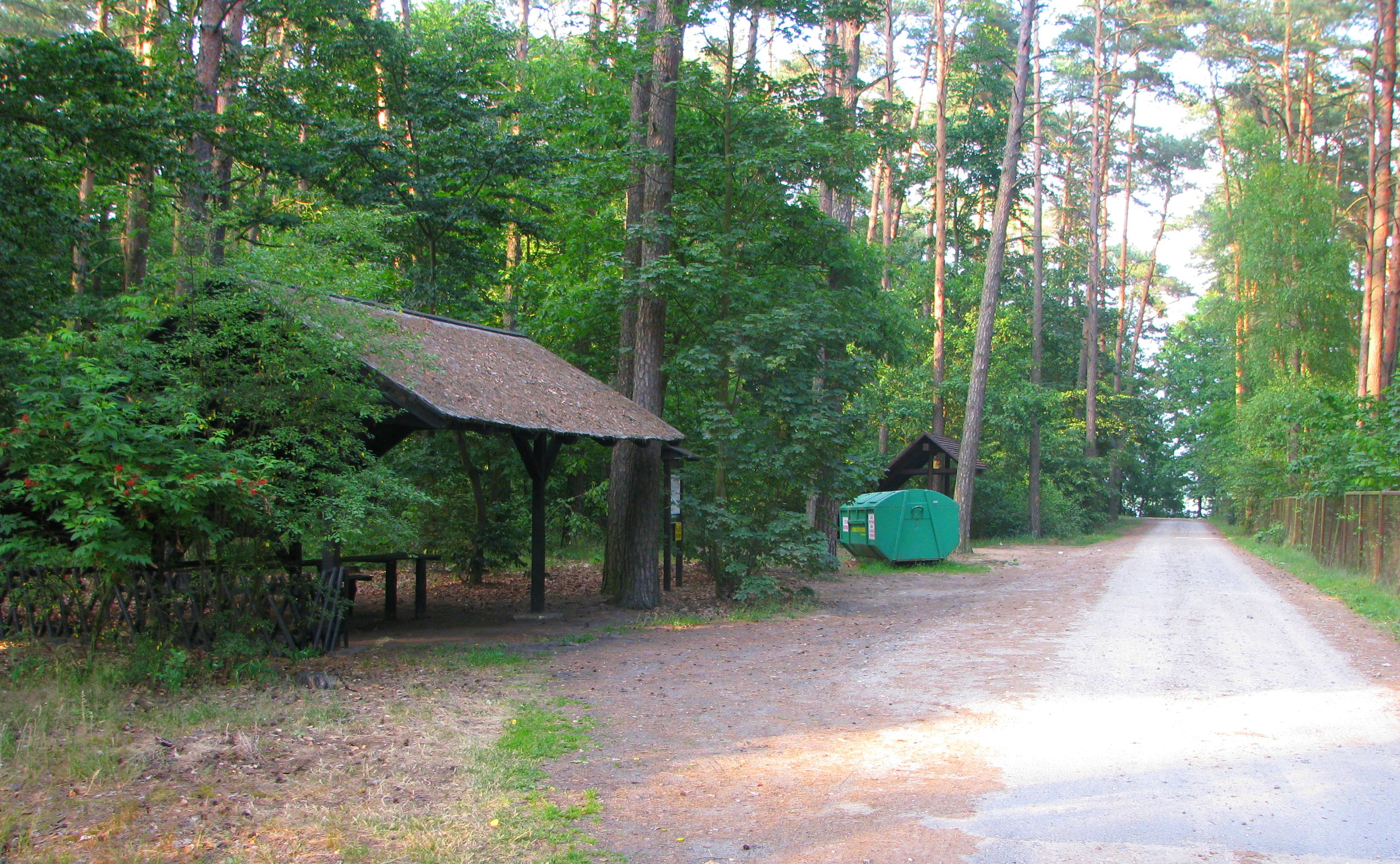

- Location within Poland
- Coordinates: 52°59′N 19°33′E
- Country: Poland
- Voivodeship: Kuyavian-Pomeranian
- County: Rypin
- Gmina: Skrwilno

Urszulewo [urʂuˈlɛvɔ] is a village in the administrative district of Gmina Skrwilno, within Rypin County, Kuyavian-Pomeranian Voivodeship, in north-central Poland.
