= Szucie =

- Village
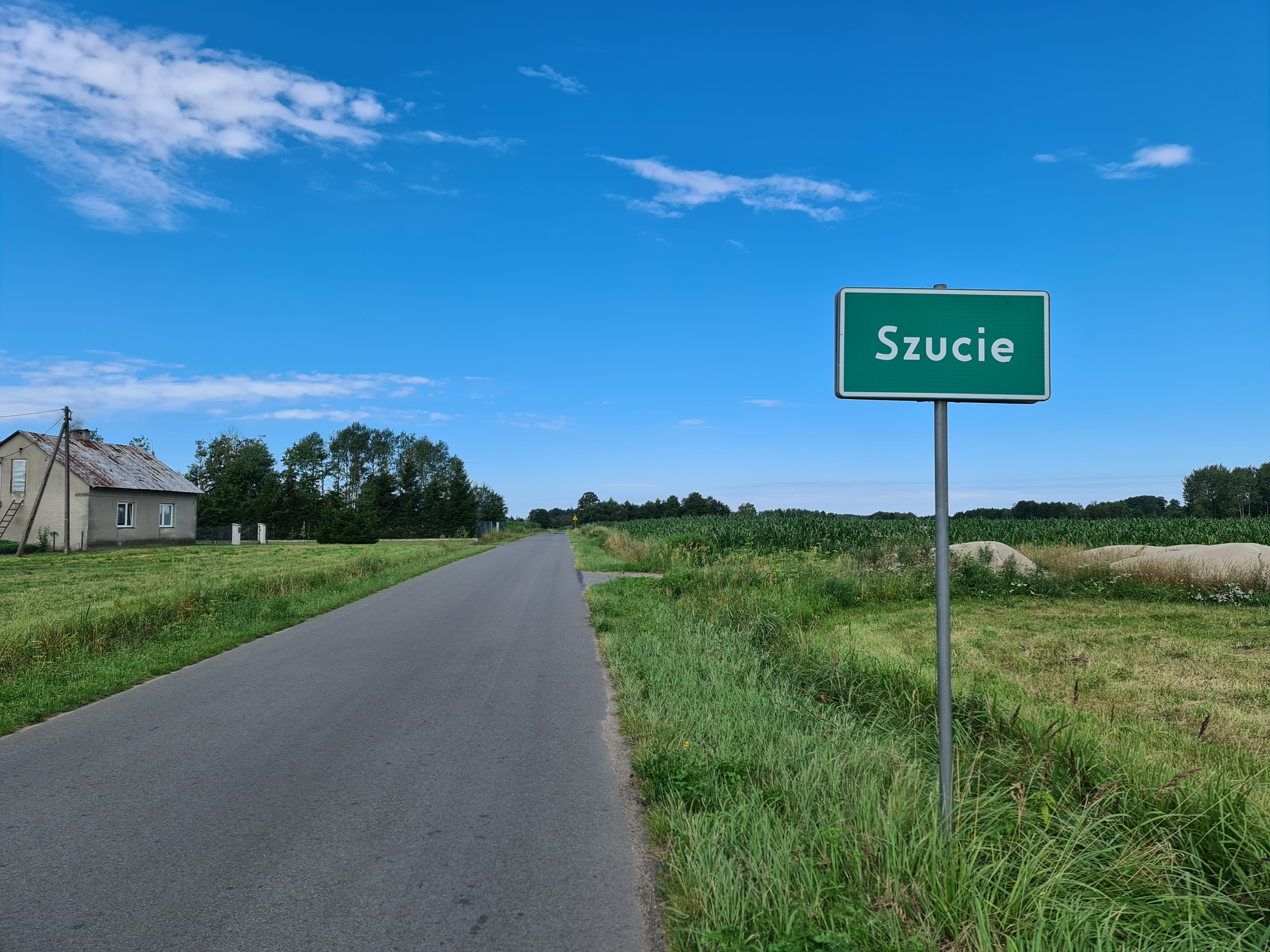

- Location within Poland
- Coordinates: 53°01′11″N 19°34′52″E
- Country: Poland
- Voivodeship: Kuyavian-Pomeranian
- County: Rypin
- Gmina: Skrwilno

Szucie [ˈʂut͡ɕɛ] is a village in the administrative district of Gmina Skrwilno, within Rypin County, Kuyavian-Pomeranian Voivodeship, in north-central Poland.
