= Andrzej Fałkowski =

Polish officer and economist

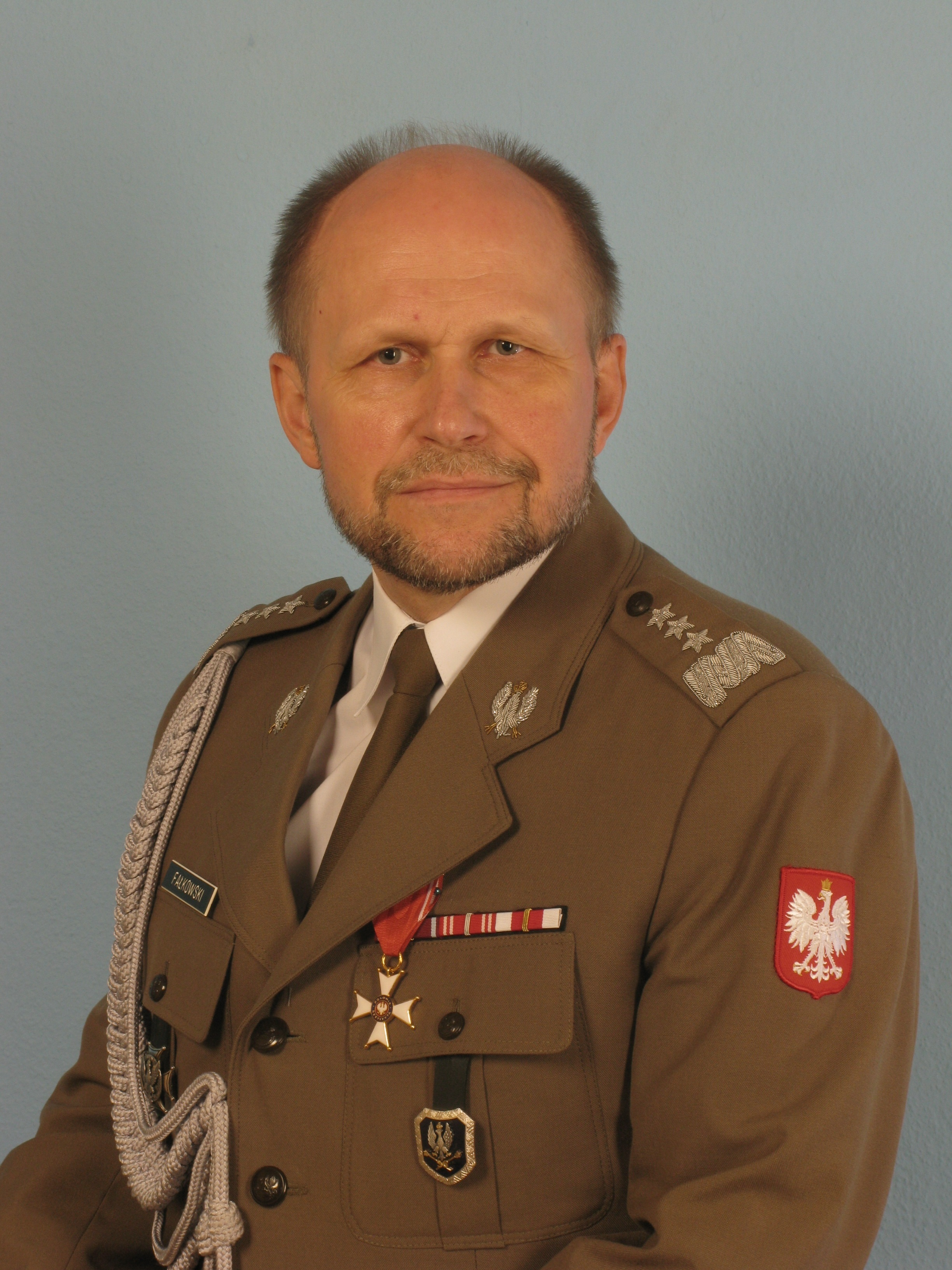
- Born: 1959 (age 66–67); Rypin, Poland
- Military career
- Allegiance: Poland
- Branch: Polish Land Forces
- Service years: 1978–2018
- Rank: General

Andrzej Fałkowski (born 1959) is a Polish retired army officer and currently a diplomat, who was last ranked as the general.

He was a specialist in public finance and military economics and defense resources, logistics and strategic planner, and was an expert on NATO, European Union, and international security policy.

He is a doctor of economic sciences.

== Biography ==
Andrzej Fałkowsk was born in Rypin in 1959.

He graduated from the Economic Secondary School in Rypin in 1977. He is a graduate of the Academy of Officers of Quartermaster Services in Poznań in 1982, and the Faculty of Economics of the University of Gdańsk in 1985.

After the officer promotion, he was assigned to the 3rd Security Regiment of the Naval Command in Gdynia, where he served until 1984. Then he was transferred to the Finance Department of the Ministry of National Defense in Warsaw.

He also completed postgraduate studies in Monterey, California, United States in 1994, and several foreign courses, including in the Netherlands Defense Academy, the NATO School in Oberammergau, Germany, as well as in Canada and the United States. He knows English.

Between 1996 and 1998, he was the deputy director of the Economic Department. In 1997, at the Faculty of Economics and Sociology of the University of Lodz, he defended the dissertation entitled "Poland's defense budget (problems, methods)" and obtained a doctoral degree in economics.

In 1998 he took the position of chief specialist, as an adviser at the Polish Representation to NATO and the Western European Union (WEU) in Brussels, and in 2003 he was appointed deputy chief of the P-5 Strategic Planning General Board at the General Staff of the Polish Army in Warsaw.

Between 2006 and 2008, he was the director of the Budget Department of the Ministry of National Defense.

In 2007, Fałkowski was elected by the NATO Military Committee as Deputy Director of the NATO International Military Staff for Logistics and Resources in Brussels, which he assumed in September 2008.

At that time, during 3 years, he was the interim chairman of the NATO Military Personnel Resources Committee, co-chairman of the NATO Military Logistics Committee, representative of the NATO Military Committee in the Resource Planning and Policy Council and the Conference of National Directors on Armaments (CNAD), deputy chairman and representative of the Military Committee at the Research and Technology Council . He also co-chaired the NATO Standardization Committee.

From 2011 to mid-2013, he served as Defense, Military, Naval and Air Attaché at the Embassy of the Poland in the United States in Washington DC. From 2013 to 2014 he was the deputy Chief of the General Staff of the Polish Army, between 2014 and 2018 he served as the Polish Military Representative at the Military Committees of NATO and the European Union in Brussels. He has repeatedly represented the Ministry of National Defense, as well as a moderator and speaker at international conferences and seminars.

In May 2015, Fałkowski was one of the Polish people sanctioned by Russia during the Russo-Ukrainian War.

=== Education ===
He was invited to give lectures at foreign universities, incl. NATO School in Oberammergau (2000, 2010–2011, 2017), the Academy of General Staff of Ukraine in Kyiv in 2002, the Baltic Defense Academy in Tartu, Estonia (2009–2011, 2016-2018), as a representative of NATO HQ - Federation General Staff Academy In Moscow (2010), Université libre de Bruxelles (2010), National Defense University in Washington (2012), American University in Washington (2013), NATO Defense College in Rome (2015), as well as at national universities, incl. .: often at the National Defense University and the University of Warsaw (2005) and the National School of Public Administration (2005). He was a lecturer and promoter of master's and diploma theses at the National Defense University and the Warsaw University. Maria Skłodowskiej-Curie. In 2016, he gave an inaugural lecture at the beginning of the academic year at the Naval Academy in Gdynia.

== Litiature ==
He is the author of the book "Pecunia nervus belli - Shaping Poland's defense budget" and many publications on finance, defense economics and financing of NATO and security policy, incl. in the pages of: Przegląd Morski, Przegląd Quartmistrzowski, Myśli Wojskowej, Scientific Journals of the National Defense University, Polish Armed Forces, Military Logistics Review, Financial Bulletin, monthly RAPORT (Wojsko Technika Obronność).

In 2018, "for winning battles in the field of diplomacy" he received the annual BUZDYGAN 2017 award from the Polska Zbrojna monthly.
