= Rak, Kuyavian-Pomeranian Voivodeship =

Rak
- Village
- Location within Poland
- Coordinates: 53°2′N 19°40′E
- Country: Poland
- Voivodeship: Kuyavian-Pomeranian
- County: Rypin
- Gmina: Skrwilno

Rak [rak] is a village in the administrative district of Gmina Skrwilno, within Rypin County, Kuyavian-Pomeranian Voivodeship, in north-central Poland.
