= Obory, Golub-Dobrzyń County =

Obory
- Village
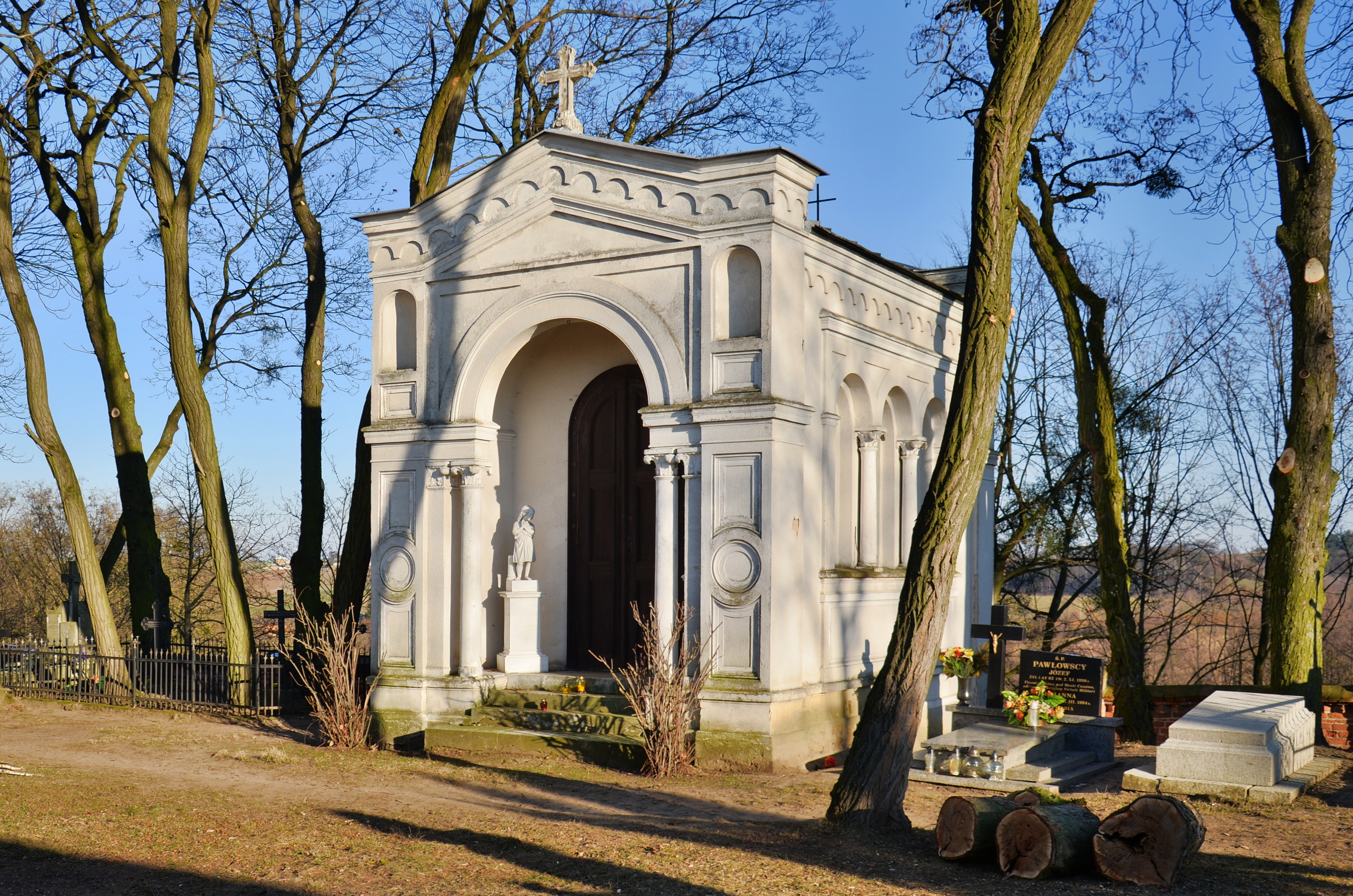

- Location within Poland
- Coordinates: 53°00′07″N 19°12′50″E
- Country: Poland
- Voivodeship: Kuyavian-Pomeranian
- County: Golub-Dobrzyń
- Gmina: Zbójno
- Population: 211

Obory [ɔˈbɔrɨ] is a village in the administrative district of Gmina Zbójno, within Golub-Dobrzyń County, Kuyavian-Pomeranian Voivodeship, in north-central Poland.

The village is the sanctuary of the Patroness of Dobrzyń Land with the miraculous statue of Our Lady of Sorrows crowned officially in 1976.
