= Mirosław Krajewski =

Polish politician (born 1946)

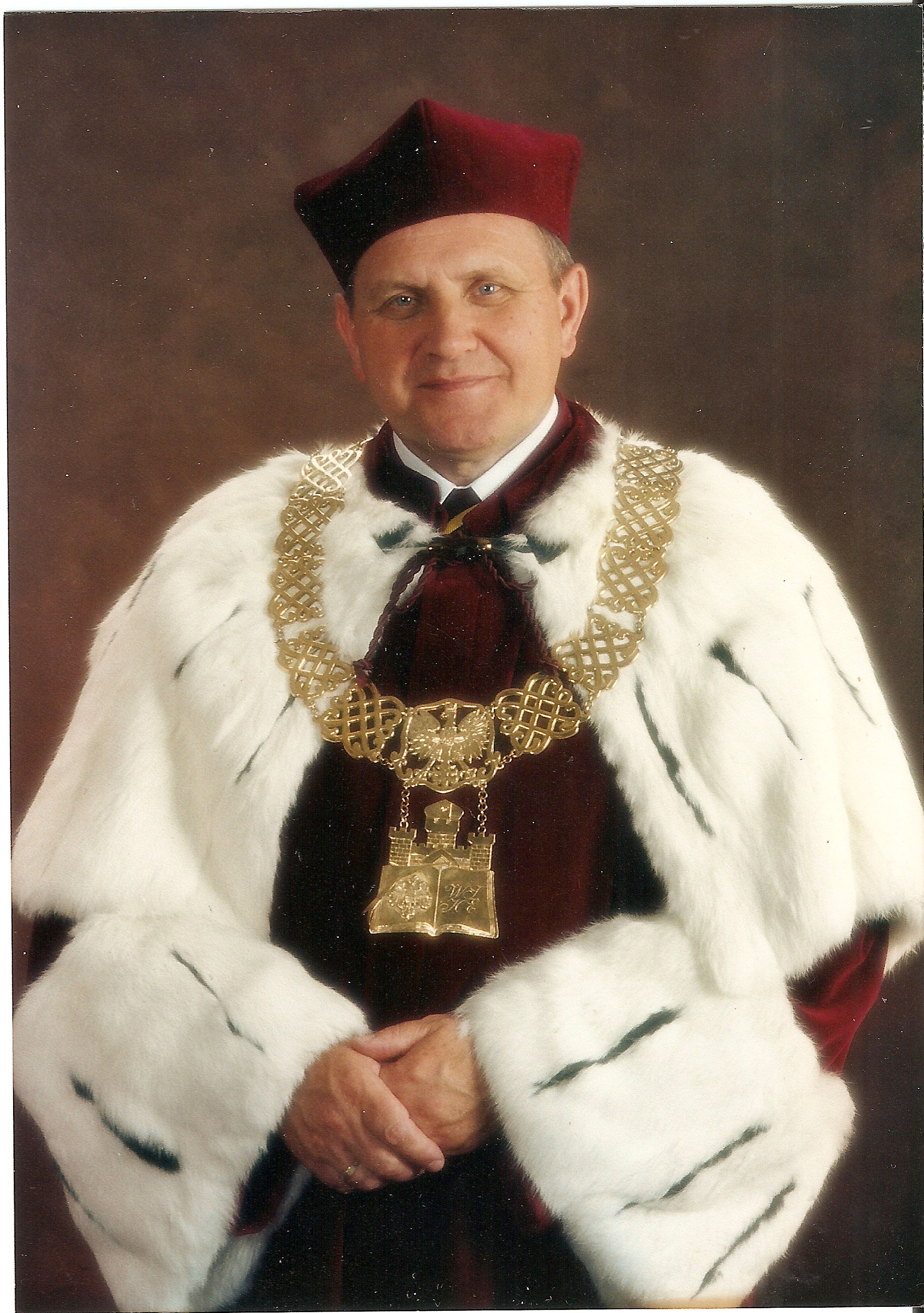

Member of Sejm
- In office 13 October 2004 – 4 November 2007

Personal details
- Born: 13 October 1946 (age 79) Poland
- Party: Samoobrona

Mirosław Krajewski (born 13 October 1946 in Nowiny) is a Polish politician. He was elected to the Sejm on 25 September 2005, getting 11,333 votes in 5 Toruń district as a candidate from the Samoobrona Rzeczpospolitej Polskiej list.

He was also a member of Sejm 2001-2005.

== See also ==
- Members of Polish Sejm 2005-2007
