= Rypin =

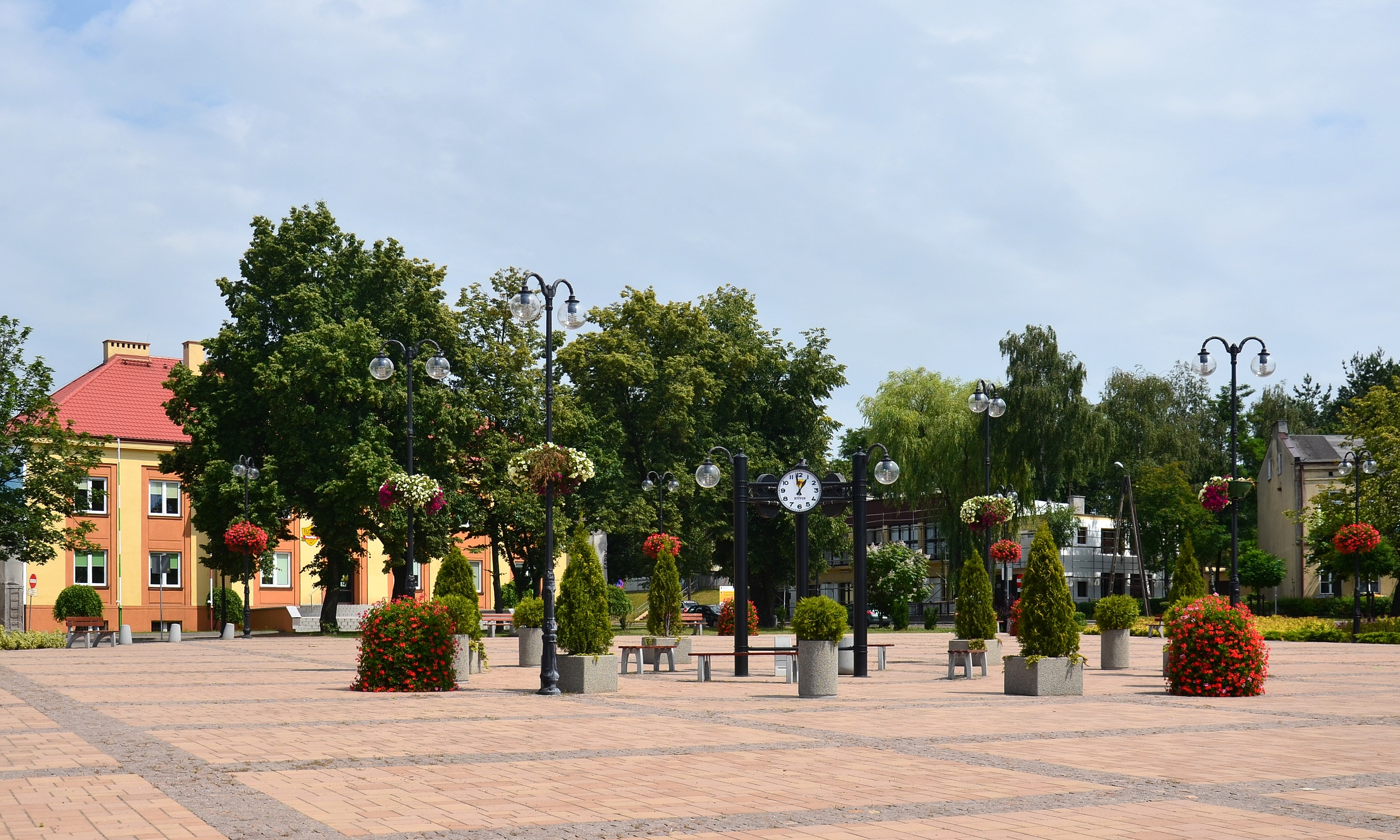
- Nowy Rynek (New Market Square)

- Flag Coat of arms

- Location within Poland
- Coordinates: 53°4′N 19°27′E
- Country: Poland
- Voivodeship: Kuyavian-Pomeranian
- County: Rypin
- Gmina: Rypin (urban gmina)
- Town rights: 14th century

Government
  - Mayor: Pawel Grzybowski (PiS)

Area
  - Total: 10.96 km^{2} (4.23 sq mi)

Population (2025)
  - Total: 15,143
  - Density: 1,382/km^{2} (3,578/sq mi)
- Time zone: UTC+1 (CET)
  - Summer (DST): UTC+2 (CEST)
- Postal code: 87-500
- Car plates: CRY
- Website: http://www.rypin.eu/

Rypin [ˈrɨpʲin] is a town in north-central Poland, in Kuyavian-Pomeranian Voivodeship, about 50 km east of Toruń. It is the capital of Rypin County and had a population of 15,143 as of 2025.

== History ==
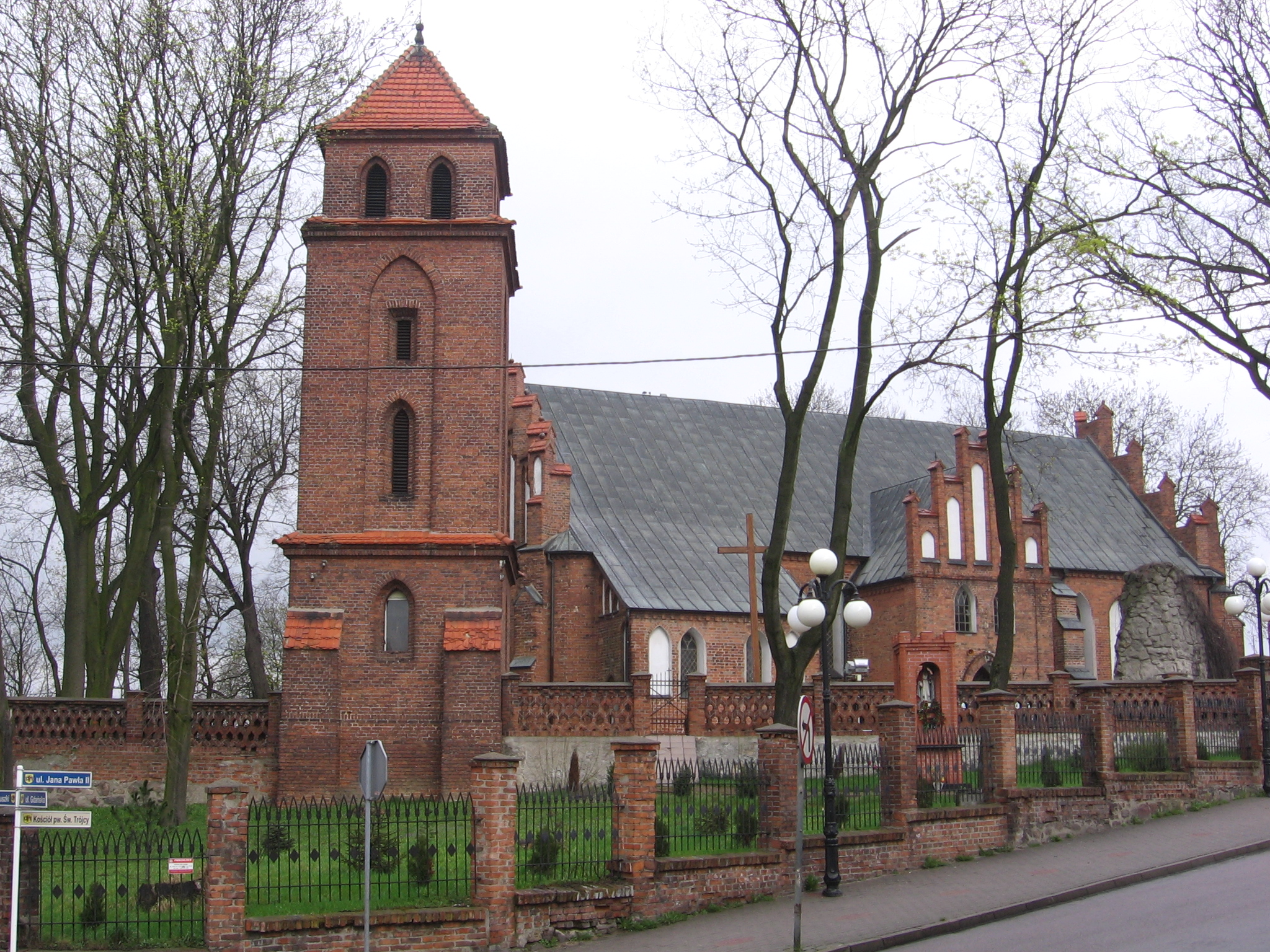
Gothic Holy Trinity church

The region around present-day Rypin has been inhabited since at least the 10th century. The original settlement, now referred to as Starorypin, was located 3 kilometers north of the current town center. From the 11th century it was the seat of a local castellany, and from the 14th century it was a county seat. The original settlement was completely destroyed during a Teutonic raid in 1329. The settlement surrounding must have held significant importance, as documents from 1326 refer to it as a civitas. The town was later re-founded in a new location (present-day Rypin), while the former site took the name Starorypin.

It was granted town rights in the early 14th century, and afterwards it was a royal town of the Polish Crown, administratively located in the Dobrzyń Land in the Inowrocław Voivodeship in the Greater Poland Province. In the early 14th century, local dukes of the Polish Piast dynasty founded a hospital in Rypin to commemorate their deceased father Duke Siemowit of Dobrzyń. In 1352, the hospital was granted various privileges by Duke Władysław the Hunchback. Rypin was located on a trade route connecting Toruń with Brześć. The 1st Polish National Cavalry Brigade was stationed in the town.

Following the Second Partition of Poland (1793), the town was annexed by Kingdom of Prussia. In 1807, it passed to the short-lived Polish Duchy of Warsaw, and after its dissolution in 1815, it became part of the Russian Partition of Poland. During the January Uprising, Polish insurgents captured the town on February 4, 1863. Following World War I, Poland regained independence and control of Rypin. During the Polish–Soviet War, Rypin was occupied by Russians on 14 August 1920, and liberated by Poles on 20 August 1920.

=== Interbellum ===
The Interbellum marked a phase of urban development and economic growth for Rypin. During this time, the city expanded its civic infrastructure, constructing St. Martin's Hospital (later named after Dr. Franciszek Dłutek), the J. Piłsudski Primary School (later Primary School No. 1), a secondary school (gimnazjum, later the Fr. Czesław Lissowski School Complex No. 1), and a municipal stadium. Local economic enterprises established during this period included the ROTR Dairy Cooperative, a cooperative bank, and the Farmers' Cooperative Mill. Rypin also served as the regional headquarters for several national organizations and local associations.

The town also had a multi-ethnic and multi-confessional population, evidenced by the presence of several places of worship: the Catholic Church of the Holy Trinity, an Evangelical-Augsburg church, a synagogue, and an Eastern Orthodox church (which was demolished in 1937).

Following the 1938 territorial reform, administrative control of Rypin was transferred to the Pomeranian Voivodeship.

=== World War II ===
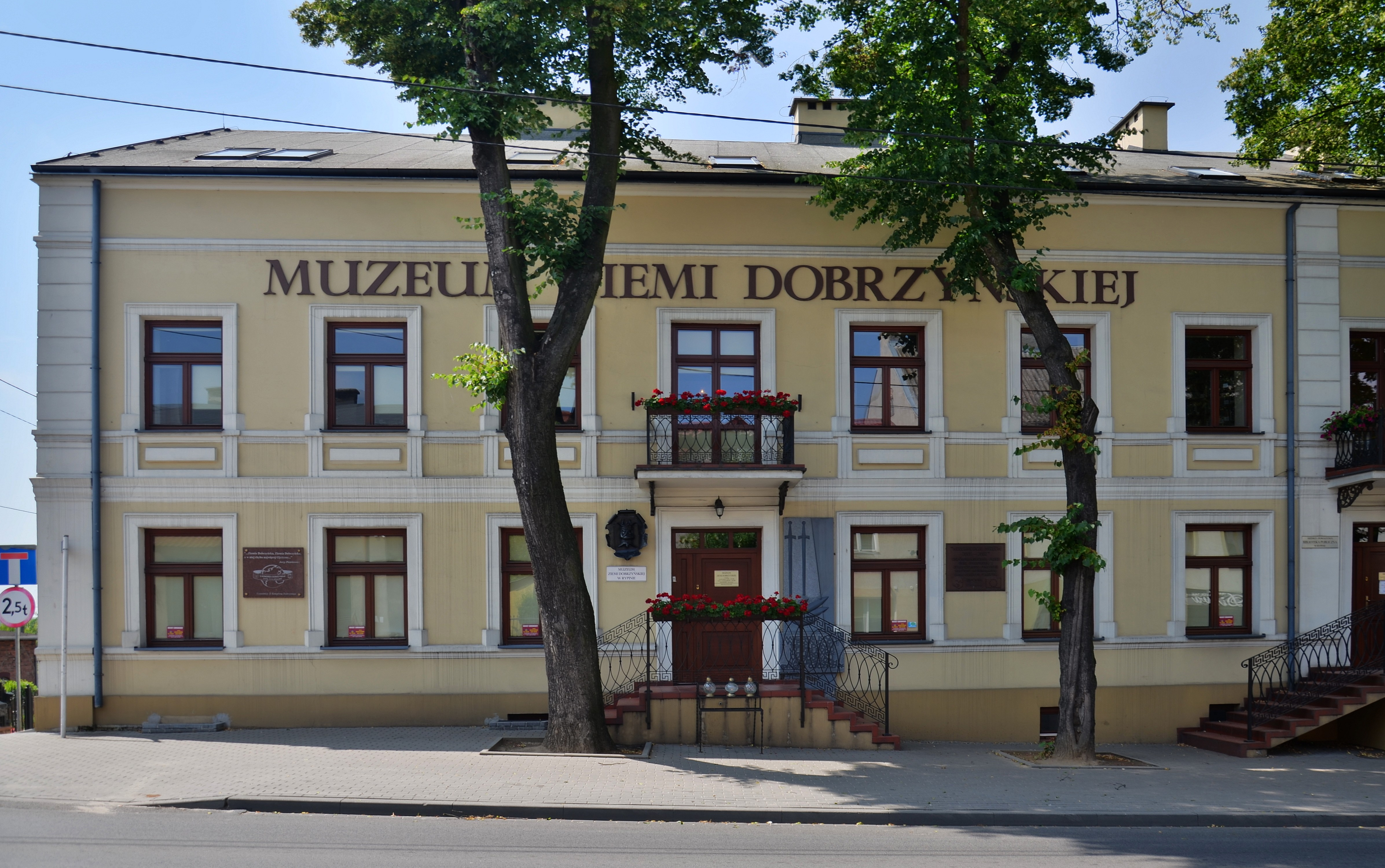
Seat of the local Selbstschutz and Gestapo during the German occupation, place of imprisonment, torture and execution of many local Poles, now a museum

During the German invasion of Poland, which started World War II in September 1939, the town was invaded and then occupied by Germany until 1945. The Polish population was subjected to an extensive genocidal campaign. In September 1939, a German police prison was established in the town, and in October 1939, the German police and Selbstschutz carried out mass arrests of local Poles. Hundreds of arrested Poles were interrogated and then murdered on the spot and buried in nearby Skrwilno, during the German-perpetrated Intelligenzaktion. Among the victims were 96 Polish teachers and school principals from the town and county. Many local Poles were also murdered during large massacres carried out by the Germans in Skrwilno in October and November 1939. In 1944 the occupiers burned the victims' bodies in attempt to cover up the crime committed in Skrwilno. Poles were also murdered in other places in Rypin, and around 200 Poles from the town and county were massacred in the nearby village of Rusinowo. In 1939–1942, the Germans also expelled over 5,100 Poles from the town. Most of the expelled Poles were imprisoned in a transit camp in Toruń and then deported to the General Government in the more-eastern part of German-occupied Poland, as their houses were handed over to German colonists as part of the Lebensraum policy. According to a Gestapo document from 1942, many remaining Poles fled from Rypin trying to avoid signing to the Deutsche Volksliste, however, many Poles eventually signed under the threat of deportation to German concentration camps. A transit camp for Poles expelled from nearby villages in 1942 was operated in the town. On January 21, 1945, during the Vistula–Oder offensive, Rypin was captured by troops of the 65th Army and the 1st Guards Tank Division, leading to the establishment of communist administration in the town. Many local residents associated with the Polish resistance movement were deported east to the Soviet Union or imprisoned in special camps. Remnants of post-Home Army (AK) partisan units remained active in the Rypin area until 1947–1948.

=== Post-war period ===
In 1950, a Monument of Gratitude to the Soviet soldiers of the 2nd Belorussian Front who took Rypin in 1945 was unveiled at Freedom Square. Following the fall of communism in 1989, the monument was removed.

During the Polish People's Republic, Rypin served as a county seat until 1975. During this period, the town received several public and industrial investments, including the establishment of the Furniture Accessories Factory (Fabryka Akcesoriów Meblowych), the expansion of the county hospital, and the opening of the Secondary School of Economics (Zespół Szkół Ekonomicznych).

Following the 1975 administrative reform, Rypin was transferred to Włocławek Voivodeship.

== Landmarks ==
- Roman Catholic Church of Sacred Heart of Jesus Christ of Saint Stanislaus Kostka Parish
- Holy Trinity Church
- Evangelical-Augsburg Church built in 1888.
- Chapel of St. Barbara
- Museum of Dobrzyń Land - House of Torment former seat of Selbstschutz and Gestapo.

== Demography ==
Historical population

| Year | Pop. | ±% |
|---|---|---|
| 1789 | 250 | — |
| 1808 | 405 | +62.0% |
| 1810 | 1,126 | +178.0% |
| 1827 | 1,427 | +26.7% |
| 1830 | 1,619 | +13.5% |

| Year | Pop. | ±% |
|---|---|---|
| 1856 | 2,137 | +32.0% |
| 1862 | 2,904 | +35.9% |
| 1865 | 3,003 | +3.4% |
| 1880 | 3,009 | +0.2% |
| 1921 | 7,234 | +140.4% |

| Year | Pop. | ±% |
|---|---|---|
| 1931 | 8,348 | +15.4% |
| 1939 | 8,746 | +4.8% |
| 1946 | 7,350 | −16.0% |
| 1975 | 11,524 | +56.8% |
| 1995 | 16,780 | +45.6% |

| Year | Pop. | ±% |
|---|---|---|
| 1998 | 16,971 | +1.1% |
| 2002 | 16,585 | −2.3% |
| 2005 | 16,591 | +0.0% |
| 2010 | 16,528 | −0.4% |
| 2015 | 16,629 | +0.6% |

| Year | Pop. | ±% |
|---|---|---|
| 2020 | 15,999 | −3.8% |
| 2025 | 15,143 | −5.4% |

== Transport ==
=== Road transport ===
Voivodeship roads run through Rypin:

- No. 534 (Grudziądz – Golub-Dobrzyń – Rypin)
- No. 557 (Rypin – Lipno)
- No. 560 (Brodnica – Rypin – Sierpc – Bielsk)
- No. 563 (Rypin – Żuromin – Mława)

Bus transport links the town with Bydgoszcz, Toruń, Warsaw, Włocławek, Brodnica, Lipno and etc.

The main Bus service provider is the Kuyavian Pomeranian Road Transport (Kujawsko-Pomorski Transport Samochodowy).

=== Rail transport ===
Railway line No. 33 (Kutno-Brodnica) runs through Rypin. Regular passenger rail services were suspended in 2000, but limited passenger service resumed in 2021 with intercity connections.

== Education ==
- Primary School and Nursery Unit No.1 (Szkoła Podstawowa nr 1 im. mjr. Henryka Sucharskiego, Przedszkole Miejskie nr 2, Liceum Sztuk Plastycznych)
- Primary School and Nursery Unit No.2 (Szkoła Podstawowa nr 3 im. Jana Pawła II, Przedszkole Miejskie nr 1 z Oddziałami Integracyjnymi, Przedszkole Miejskie nr 3 im. Niezapominajki)

Secondary schools:

- Zespół Szkół nr 1 w Rypinie im. ks. Czesława Lissowskiego
  - General education liceum
- Zespół Szkół nr 2 im. Unii Europejskiej
  - Technikum
- Zespół Szkół nr 3 im. Bogdana Chełmickiego
  - Technikum
- Zespół Szkół nr 5 im. ks. Jana Twardowskiego
  - Music school
  - Special needs school
  - Vocational school

== Economy ==
Historically, the town was home to the ROTR Dairy Cooperative in Rypin (ROTR Spółdzielnia Mleczarska w Rypinie), a major dairy cooperative founded in 1926 that grew into one of Poland's largest dairy producers before declaring bankruptcy in 2018.

The local economy is centered around light manufacturing, including the clothing, food processing and metal industries, along with retail and wholesale trade. Following the fall of communism, most of the heavy industry went bankrupt in Rypin, for example the Fabryka Domów ("House Factory") - a local prefabricated concrete panel factory located in the town.

Since the turn of the 21st century, the town has experienced a steady population decline leading to the closure of several local small businesses and factories due to a growing shortage of young workers in the area.

== Politics ==
Members of Parliament (Sejm) from Rypin:

- Zbigniew Sosnowski
- Iwona Hartwich

=== List of mayors (since 1990) ===
- Adam Łapkiewicz (1990–1998)
- Stefan Borowski (1998–2002)
- Krzysztof Maciejewski (2002–2006) (SLD)
- Marek Błaszkiewicz (2006–2010) (PO)
- Paweł Grzybowski (2010–present) (PiS)

== Notable people ==
- Andrzej Fałkowski (born 1959), Polish army officer
- Chaja Goldstein (1908–1999), dancer and singer
- Ivor Mairants (1908–1998), jazz and classical guitarist
- Zbigniew Sosnowski (born 1963), politician
- Jacob Talmon (1916–1980), Professor of Modern History at the Hebrew University of Jerusalem
- Faustin E. Wirkus (1896–1945), American marine

== Sport ==
- Lech Rypin - football club

== International relations ==
=== Twin towns – Sister cities ===
Rypin is twinned with:

- Bauska, Latvia
- Łęczyca, Poland
- Uggiate-Trevano, Italy
- Pakruojis, Lithuania
- Hedemora, Sweden

== Gallery ==
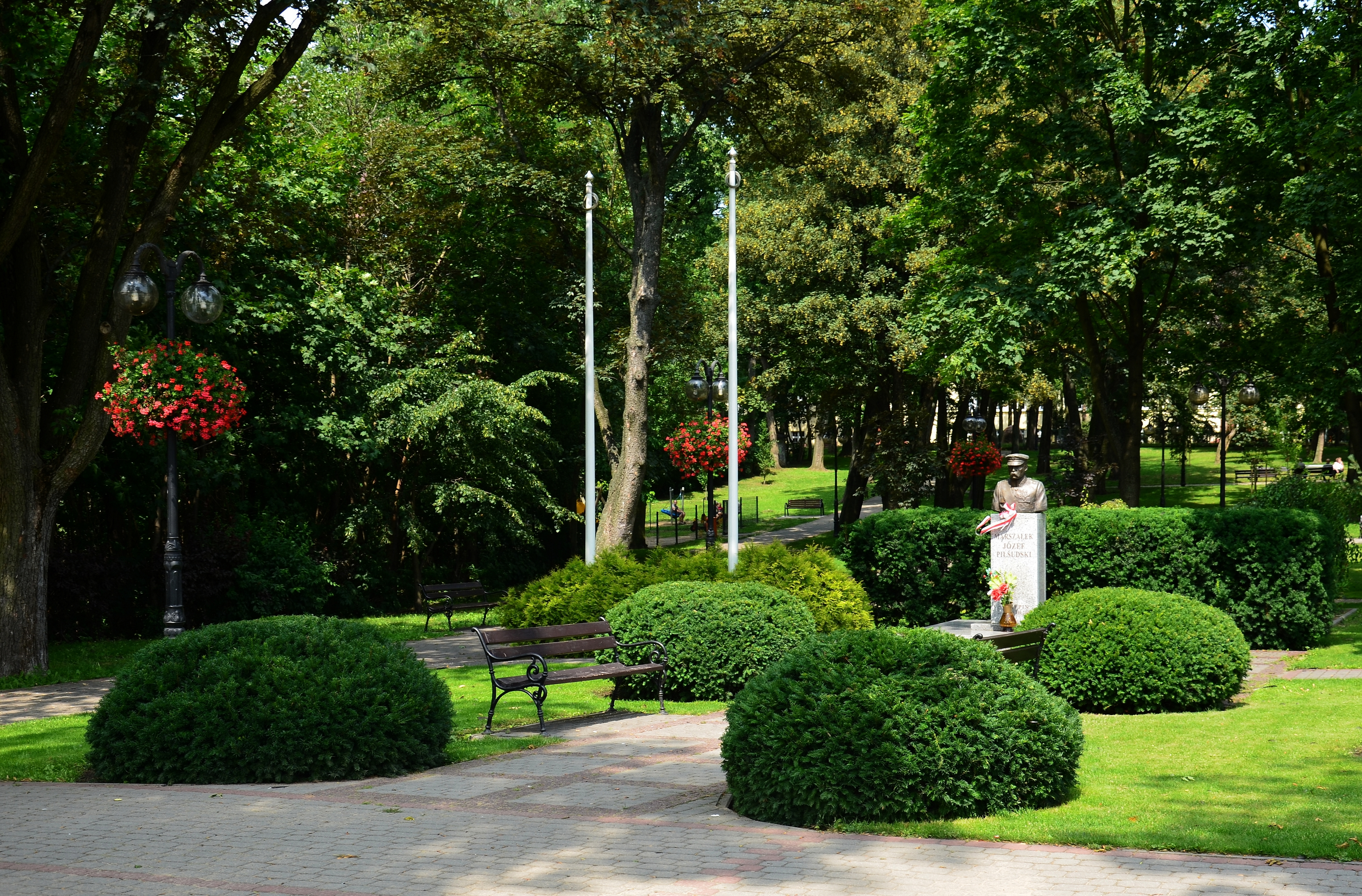
Marshal Józef Piłsudski Park with the Piłsudski Monument

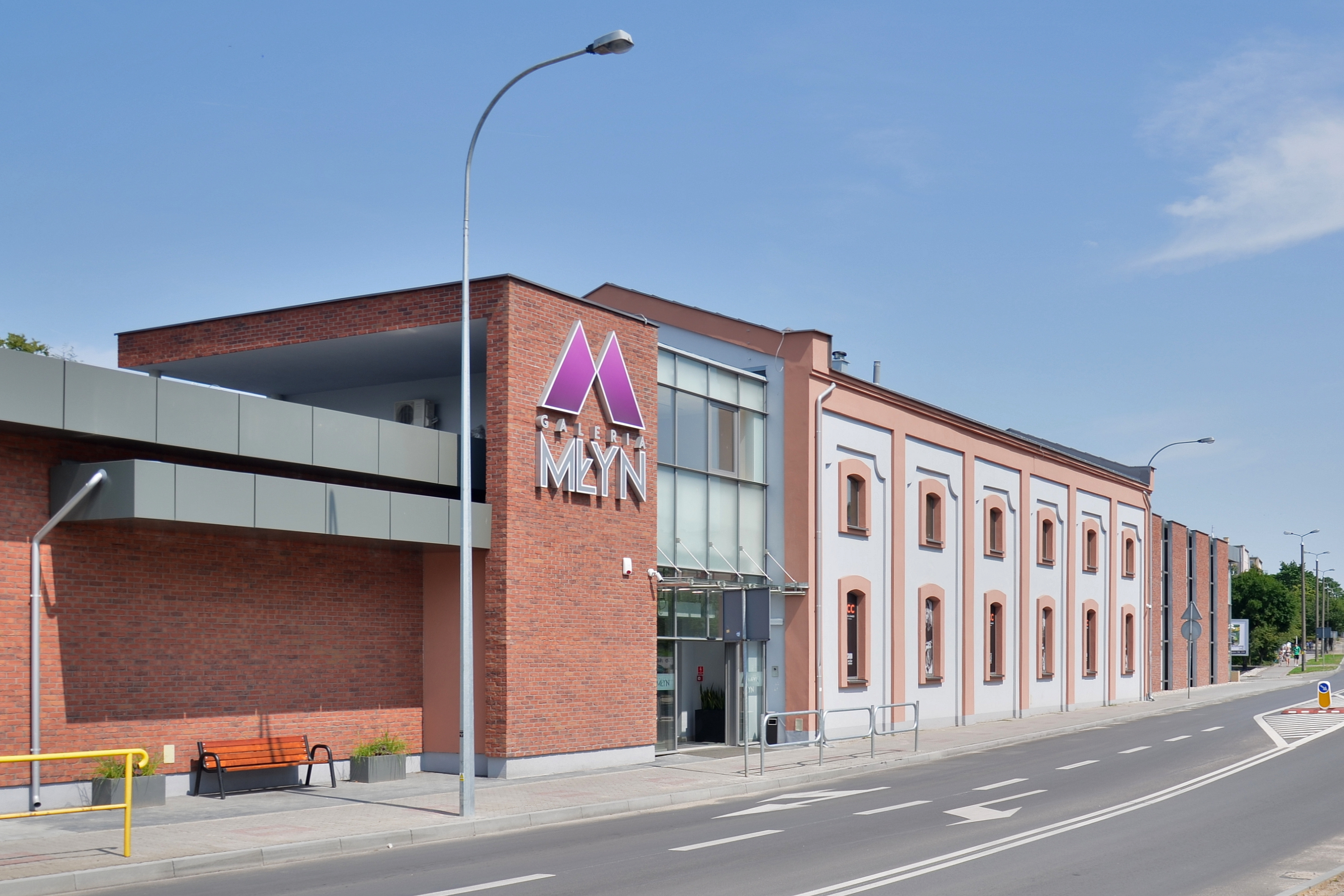
Galeria Młyn shopping mall

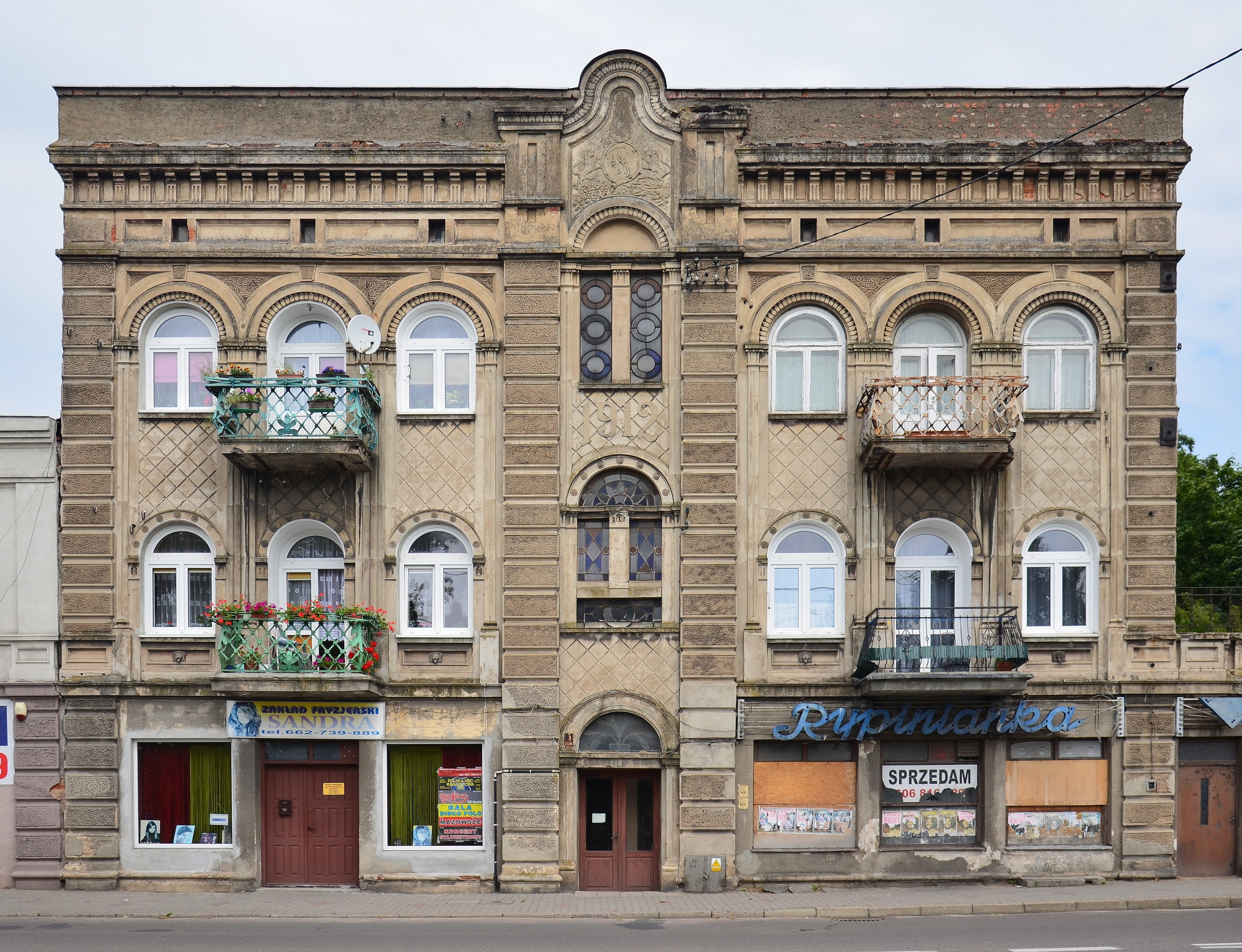
Art Nouveau architecture

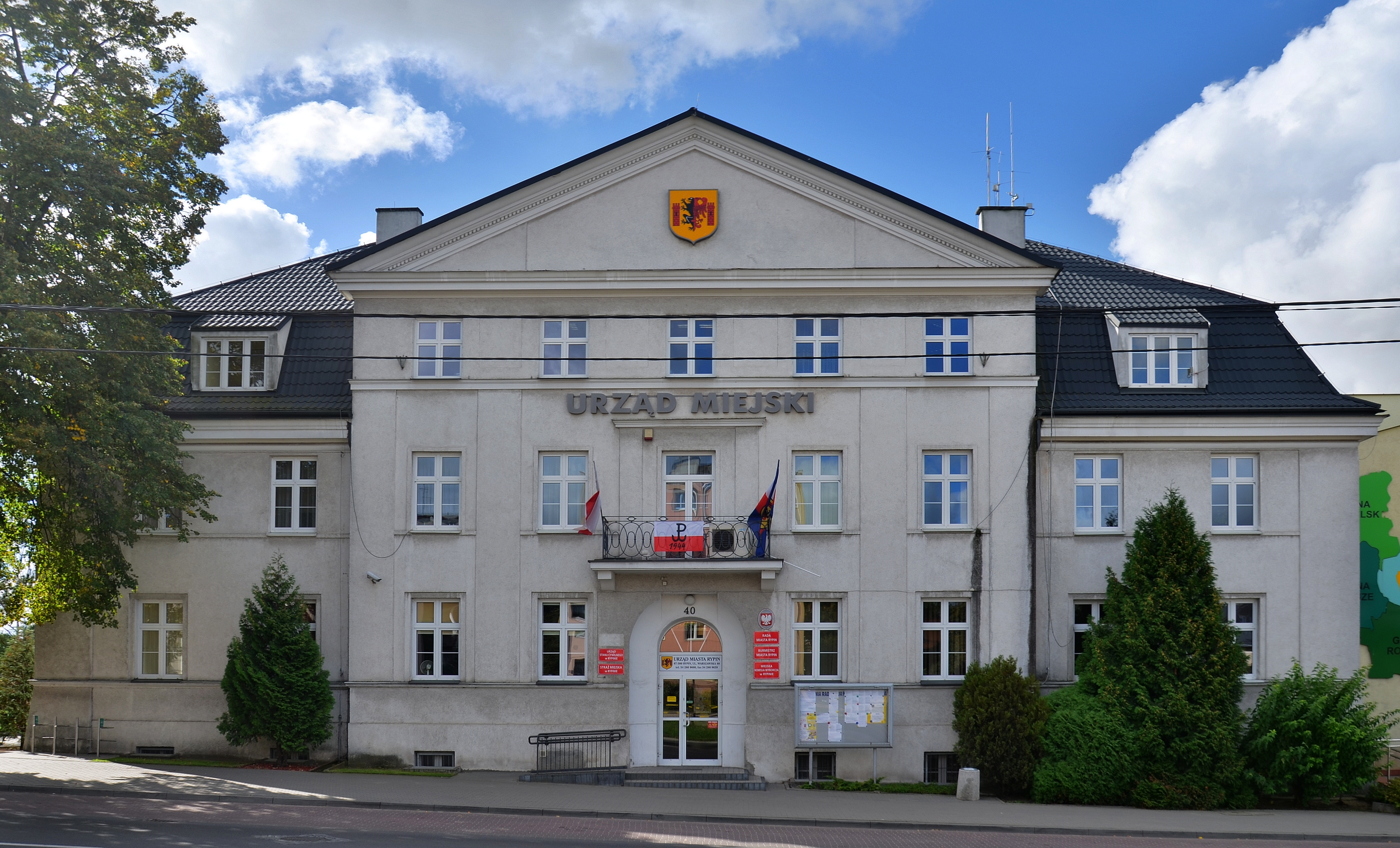
Town hall, local seat of authorities

== See also ==
Near to Rypin is Lake Urszulewo.
