= Rusinowo, Rypin County =

Rusinowo
- Village
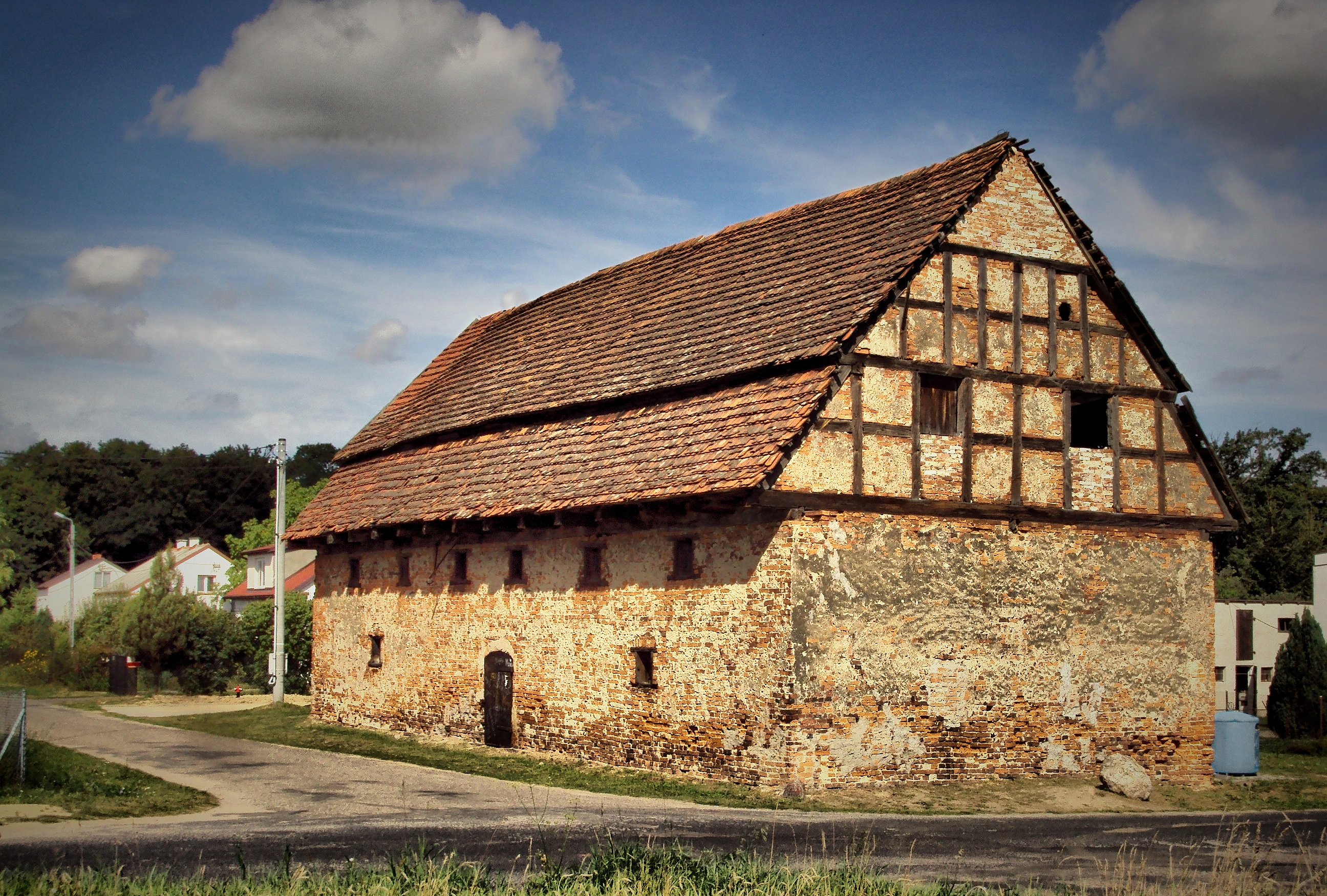
- Granarie shed in Rusinowo

- Location within Poland
- Coordinates: 53°05′21″N 19°23′19″E
- Country: Poland
- Voivodeship: Kuyavian-Pomeranian
- County: Rypin
- Gmina: Rypin
- Time zone: UTC+1 (CET)
  - Summer (DST): UTC+2 (CEST)
- Vehicle registration: CRY

Rusinowo [ruɕiˈnɔvɔ] is a village in the administrative district of Gmina Rypin, within Rypin County, Kuyavian-Pomeranian Voivodeship, in north-central Poland.

== History ==
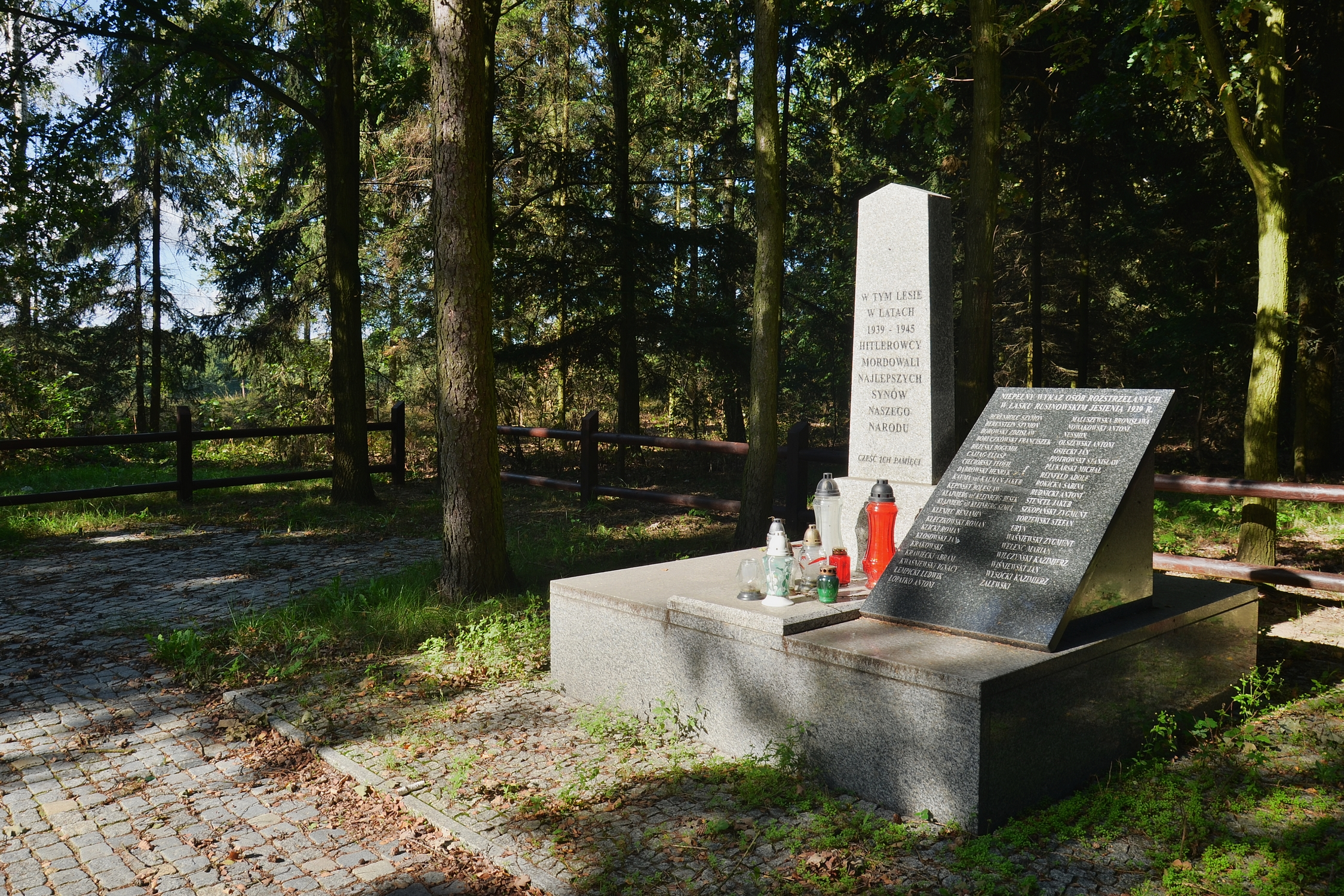
Memorial at the site of the German massacre of Poles carried out during World War II

According to the 1921 census, the village with the adjacent manor farm had a population of 436, entirely Polish by nationality and 93.6% Roman Catholic and 6.4% Lutheran by confession.

During the German occupation of Poland (World War II), Rusinowo was the site of a massacre of around 200 Poles from the nearby town of Rypin and the Rypin County, carried out by Germany as part of the genocidal Intelligenzaktion. In 1942, the occupiers also carried out expulsions of Poles, whose farms were then handed over to Germans as part of the Lebensraum policy.
