= Skrwilno =

- Village
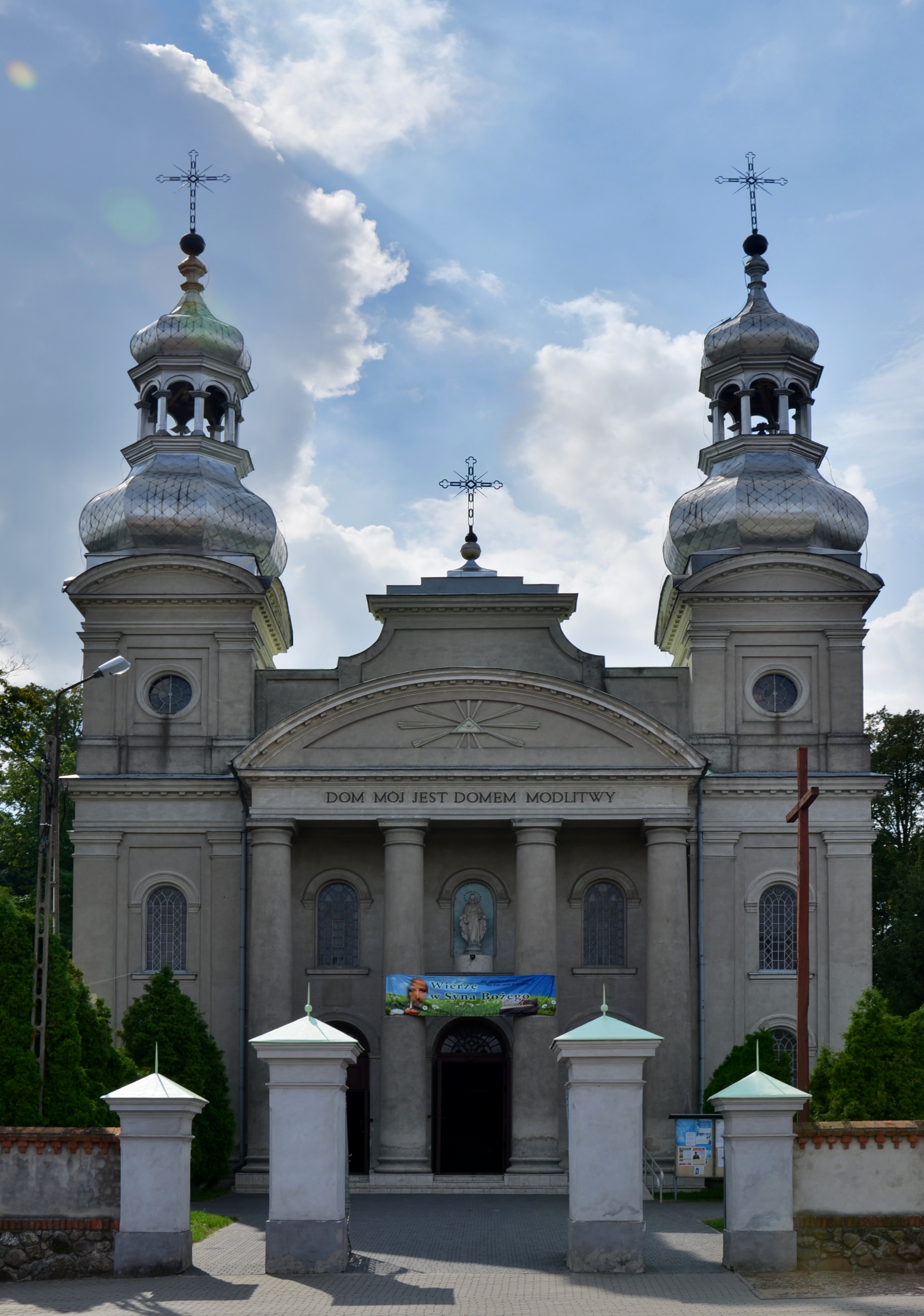
- Saint Anne church in Skrwilno

- Location within Poland
- Coordinates: 53°1′N 19°36′E
- Country: Poland
- Voivodeship: Kuyavian-Pomeranian
- County: Rypin
- Gmina: Skrwilno
- Elevation: 125 m (410 ft)

Population (approx.)
  - Total: 1,700
- Time zone: UTC+1 (CET)
  - Summer (DST): UTC+2 (CEST)
- Vehicle registration: CRY
- Website: http://www.skrwilno.lo.pl/

Skrwilno [ˈskrvilnɔ] is a village in Rypin County, Kuyavian-Pomeranian Voivodeship, in north-central Poland. It is the seat of the gmina (administrative district) called Gmina Skrwilno.

== History ==
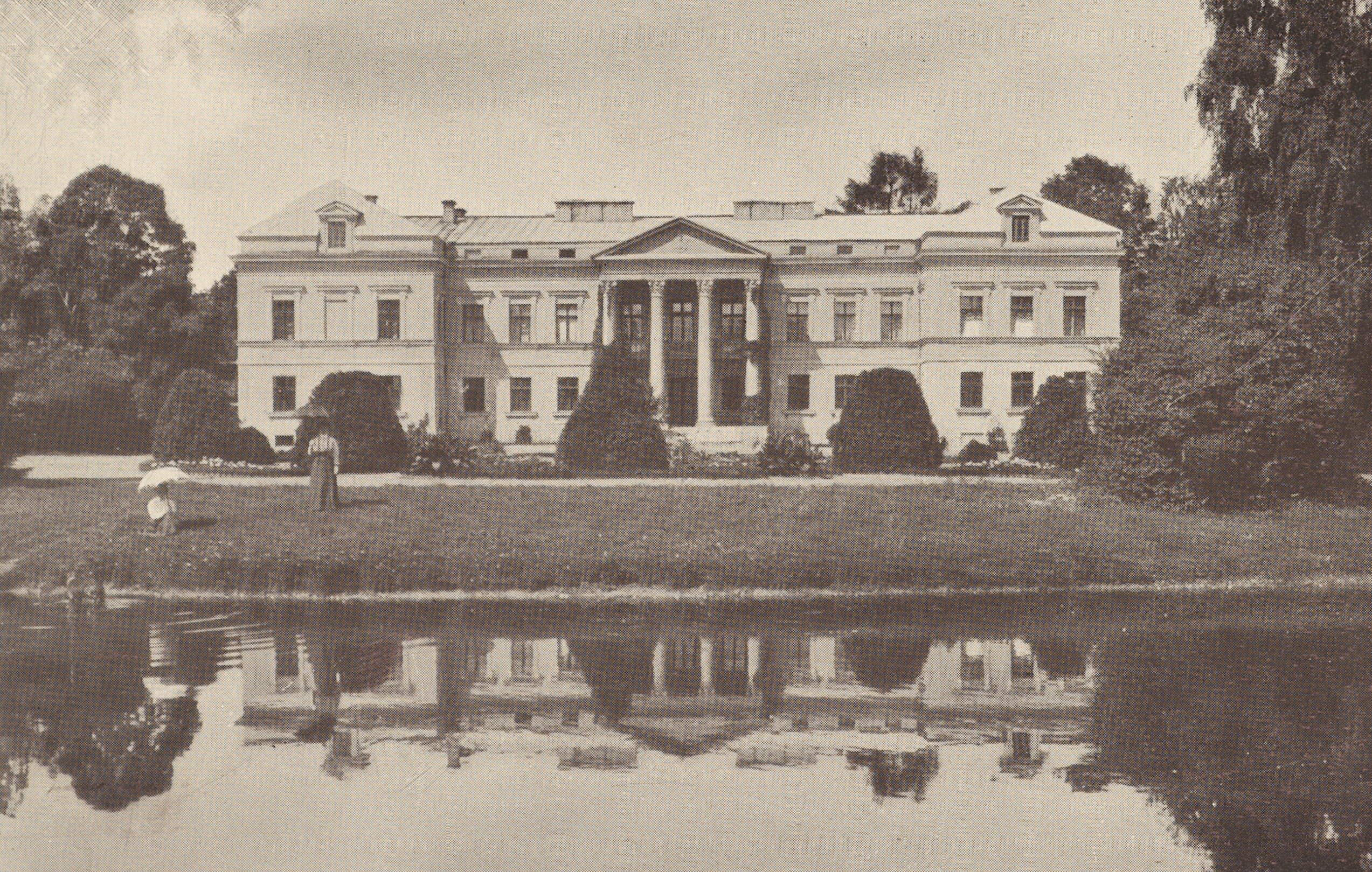
Jeżewski Palace in the early 20th century

Skrwilno dates back to the Middle Ages, when it was a Polish stronghold. The stronghold was probably built by first historic Polish ruler Mieszko I in the 10th century.

During the Swedish invasion of Poland, in 1658, the Swedes murdered the local Polish priest Walerian Cząpski.

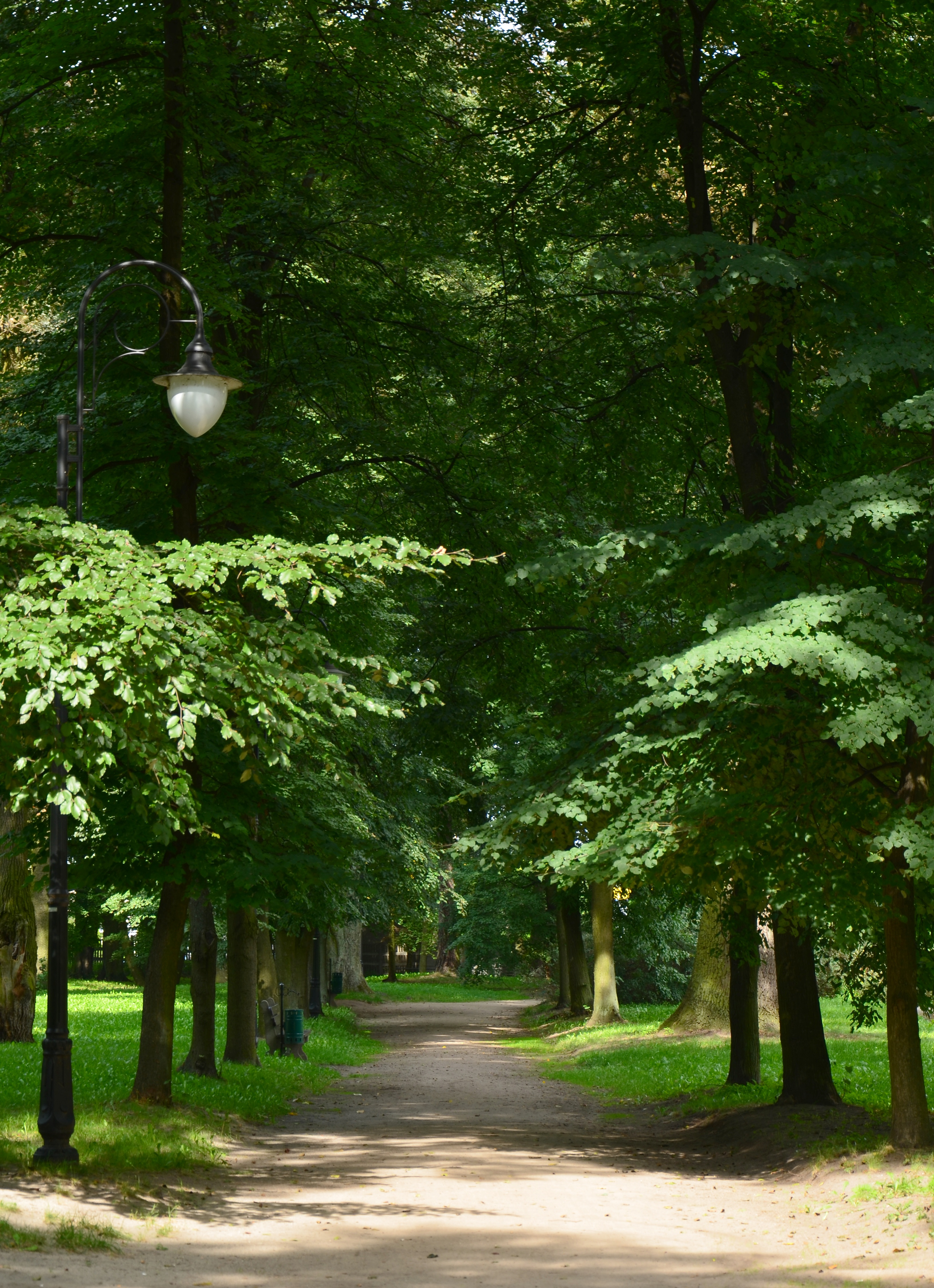
Manor park

According to the 1921 census, the village with the adjacent manor farm had a population of 957, 99.1% Polish.

During the occupation of Poland (World War II), Skrwilno was the site of large massacres of Poles from the region, including the towns of Rypin, Wąbrzeźno, Brodnica and the village of Skrwilno itself, perpetrated by the Germans between October 15 and November 15, 1939 (see Nazi crimes against the Polish nation). Also Poles murdered in Rypin were buried in the village. Several local teachers were also among Polish teachers from the county deceitfully gathered at a supposed formal meeting in Rypin and massacred there in November 1939. In 1944, the Germans burned the bodies of the victims in attempt to cover up the massacre in Skrwilno. The Germans also destroyed the historic palace.

In 1961, a collection of gold and silver tableware, jewelry and pearls from the 16th and 17th century, was found at the medieval stronghold. Named the Skrwilno Treasure, it is considered one of the most valuable treasures found in Poland in the 20th century. The treasure belonged to Polish noblewoman Zofia Piwowa, who probably buried it during the Swedish invasion of Poland around 1655. It is displayed at the District Museum in Toruń.

== Notable people ==
- Dominik Witke-Jeżewski (1862–1944), Polish landowner, nobleman, collector and patron of art
