= Bernard Świerczyna =

Bernard Świerczyna (1914 – 30 December 1944) was a Polish soldier, resistance activist and poet.

== Life ==
While a secondary student in Silesia, Świerczyna wrote and published poems and radio plays. He passed his secondary school final examinations in 1935, and went to officer cadet school in Skierniewice. He fought as a reserve second lieutenant against the 1939 invasion of Poland. A member of the underground Union of Armed Struggle, Świerczyna was arrested in Kraków on 14 June 1940; and taken to Auschwitz on 18 July 1940. At the time of his arrest, Świerczyna had recently married his wife, Adelaida; their son Felicjan was not yet born. Świerczyna sent Felicjan a fairy tale from Auschwitz, together with an accompanying poem. The Fairy Tale about a Hare, a Fox, and a Cockerel was translated from the Czech and published clandestinely in the camp.

Świerczyna was active in the prisoner resistance, using the pseudonyms of Max and Benek. He was one of five resistance leaders who attempted to escape Auschwitz on 27 October 1944. After the escape attempt was betrayed, Świerczyna did not succeed in committing suicide, and was hanged on 30 December 1944, in the last execution held in the Auschwitz men's camp.

At his death Świerczyna left the following words inscribed on the door of his cell, Cell 28 in the bunker of Block 11:

I only wanted to be human and not a heartless collection of digits. To relate by existence to the future and know the secret of future history. I have been captured treacherously by force and locked behind bars, but my honour has not been broken and will not be broken even by the executioner. – How sweet it is to die for the fatherland.
