= 2027 4 Hours of Portimão =

The 2027 4 Hours of Portimão may refer to:

- 2027 4 Hours of Portimão (AsLMS), a round of the 2026–27 Asian Le Mans Series scheduled to be held on 20–21 February 2027
- 2027 4 Hours of Portimão (ELMS), a round of the 2027 European Le Mans Series scheduled to be held on 2 October 2027
