= 2027 Formula Regional European Championship =

Motor racing competition

The 2027 FIA Formula Regional European Championship is a scheduled multi-event, Formula Regional open-wheel single seater motor racing championship to be held across Europe. The championship will feature a mix of professional and amateur drivers, competing in Formula Regional cars that conform to the FIA Formula Regional regulations for the championship. This will be the ninth season of the championship.

== Teams and drivers ==
All teams will compete using identical Tatuus T-326 cars powered by Toyota engines on Pirelli tyres. The twelve pre-selected teams for the 2027 season were announced on 14 October 2026.

Team	No.	Driver	Status	Rounds
(France) ART Grand Prix	TBA	TBA		TBC
(France) ART Grand Prix	TBA	TBA		TBC
(France) ART Grand Prix	TBA	TBA		TBC
(Italy) CL Motorsport	TBA	TBA		TBC
(Italy) CL Motorsport	TBA	TBA		TBC
(Italy) CL Motorsport	TBA	TBA		TBC
(Switzerland) G4 Racing	TBA	TBA		TBC
(Switzerland) G4 Racing	TBA	TBA		TBC
(Switzerland) G4 Racing	TBA	TBA		TBC
(United Kingdom) Invicta Racing	TBA	TBA		TBC
(United Kingdom) Invicta Racing	TBA	TBA		TBC
(United Kingdom) Invicta Racing	TBA	TBA		TBC
(Italy) LN4 Fusion	TBA	(Brazil) Miguel Costa		TBC
(Italy) LN4 Fusion	TBA	TBA		TBC
(Italy) LN4 Fusion	TBA	TBA		TBC
(Netherlands) MP Motorsport	TBA	TBA		TBC
(Netherlands) MP Motorsport	TBA	TBA		TBC
(Netherlands) MP Motorsport	TBA	TBA		TBC
(Italy) Prema Racing	TBA	TBA		TBC
(Italy) Prema Racing	TBA	TBA		TBC
(Italy) Prema Racing	TBA	TBA		TBC
(France) R-ace GP	TBA	(Ukraine) Oleksandr Bondarev		TBC
(France) R-ace GP	TBA	TBA		TBC
(France) R-ace GP	TBA	TBA		TBC
(New Zealand) Rodin Motorsport	TBA	(Australia) Alex Ninovic		TBC
(New Zealand) Rodin Motorsport	TBA	TBA		TBC
(New Zealand) Rodin Motorsport	TBA	TBA		TBC
(Italy) RPM	TBA	TBA		TBC
(Italy) RPM	TBA	TBA		TBC
(Italy) RPM	TBA	TBA		TBC
(Italy) Trident Motorsport	TBA	TBA		TBC
(Italy) Trident Motorsport	TBA	TBA		TBC
(Italy) Trident Motorsport	TBA	TBA		TBC
(Netherlands) Van Amersfoort Racing	TBA	TBA		TBC
(Netherlands) Van Amersfoort Racing	TBA	TBA		TBC
(Netherlands) Van Amersfoort Racing	TBA	TBA		TBC
TBA	TBA	(Turkey) Alp Aksoy		TBC

Icon	Status
R	Rookie

=== Team changes ===
Reigning two-time Formula 2 champions Invicta Racing will expand outside F2 for the first time in its history to join the FREC grid in 2027.

Italian team LN4 Fusion, co-founded by Formula One World Champion Lando Norris and karting team Fusion Motorsport, will join the grid in 2027.

=== Driver changes ===
Team's champion R-ace GP saw Rashid Al Dhaheri graduate to FIA Formula 3 with Van Amersfoort Racing. The team signed Oleksandr Bondarev, who will make his full-season debut with the team after driving for VAR during the final two rounds of 2026.

MP Motorsport's 2026 runner-up Sebastian Wheldon will graduate to FIA F3, where he will join Trident.

Prema Racing's Kean Nakamura-Berta and Salim Hanna will graduate to FIA F3, where Nakamura Berta will join Trident, and Hanna will join Campos.

Rodin Motorsport promoted Reza Seewooruthun to its FIA F3 outfit, while Gabriel Gomez also steps up to FIA F3 with LN4 Fusion. The team signed 2026 F1 Academy champion and Red Bull Junior driver Alisha Palmowski.

Van Amersfoort Racing promoted Pedro Lima from their Italian F4 and Formula Winter Series outfit, with whom he came third in the latter.

New team LN4 Fusion signed Miguel Costa, who moves over from RPM for his second FREC season after coming 23rd in 2026.

Ferrari Driver Academy member Alp Aksoy will graduate to Formula Regional Europe from Italian F4.

== Race calendar ==
The FIA announced the series' provisional calendar on 7 October 2026. The reduction from ten to eight events seen in 2026 was overturned, which meant that the three-race format used in four events in 2026 will not be used in 2027. FREC will debut at the Algarve International Circuit and at Silverstone Circuit, marking the series' first visits to Portugal and the United Kingdom, and return to Circuit de Barcelona-Catalunya after a one-year gap. The championship will also return to supporting Formula One at one event, which it last did during the 2022 Monaco Grand Prix. The Hockenheimring will not be part of the schedule for the first time since 2022.

Round		Circuit	Date	Supporting	Map of circuit locations
1	R1	(Portugal) Algarve International Circuit, Portimão	9–11 April	International GT Open; Euroformula Open Championship	2027 Formula Regional European Championship is located in Europe
1	R2	(Portugal) Algarve International Circuit, Portimão	9–11 April	International GT Open; Euroformula Open Championship	2027 Formula Regional European Championship is located in Europe
2	R1	(Austria) Red Bull Ring, Spielberg	23–25 April	Deutsche Tourenwagen Masters; ADAC GT Masters; ADAC GT4 Germany; Porsche Carrera Cup Germany	2027 Formula Regional European Championship is located in Europe
2	R2	(Austria) Red Bull Ring, Spielberg	23–25 April	Deutsche Tourenwagen Masters; ADAC GT Masters; ADAC GT4 Germany; Porsche Carrera Cup Germany	2027 Formula Regional European Championship is located in Europe
3	R1	(United Kingdom) Silverstone Circuit, Silverstone	14–16 May	International GT Open; Euroformula Open Championship	2027 Formula Regional European Championship is located in Europe
3	R2	(United Kingdom) Silverstone Circuit, Silverstone	14–16 May	International GT Open; Euroformula Open Championship	2027 Formula Regional European Championship is located in Europe
4	R1	(Belgium) Circuit de Spa-Francorchamps, Stavelot	18–20 June	British GT Championship; French GT4 Cup; TC France Series	2027 Formula Regional European Championship is located in Europe
4	R2	(Belgium) Circuit de Spa-Francorchamps, Stavelot	18–20 June	British GT Championship; French GT4 Cup; TC France Series	2027 Formula Regional European Championship is located in Europe
5	R1	(France) Circuit Paul Ricard, Le Castellet	16–18 July	International GT Open; Euroformula Open Championship; GT Cup Open Europe; E4 Championship	2027 Formula Regional European Championship is located in Europe
5	R2	(France) Circuit Paul Ricard, Le Castellet	16–18 July	International GT Open; Euroformula Open Championship; GT Cup Open Europe; E4 Championship	2027 Formula Regional European Championship is located in Europe
6	R1	(Hungary) Hungaroring, Mogyoród	30 July—1 August	Formula One World Championship; F1 Academy; Porsche Supercup	2027 Formula Regional European Championship is located in Europe
6	R2	(Hungary) Hungaroring, Mogyoród	30 July—1 August	Formula One World Championship; F1 Academy; Porsche Supercup	2027 Formula Regional European Championship is located in Europe
7	R1	(Netherlands) Circuit Zandvoort, Zandvoort	6–8 August	Deutsche Tourenwagen Masters; ADAC GT Masters; Porsche Carrera Cup Germany	2027 Formula Regional European Championship is located in Europe
7	R2	(Netherlands) Circuit Zandvoort, Zandvoort	6–8 August	Deutsche Tourenwagen Masters; ADAC GT Masters; Porsche Carrera Cup Germany	2027 Formula Regional European Championship is located in Europe
8	R1	(Italy) Imola Circuit, Imola	10–12 September	Italian GT Championship; GT4 Italian Series; Italian F4 Championship	2027 Formula Regional European Championship is located in Europe
8	R2	(Italy) Imola Circuit, Imola	10–12 September	Italian GT Championship; GT4 Italian Series; Italian F4 Championship	2027 Formula Regional European Championship is located in Europe
9	R1	(Italy) Monza Circuit, Monza	24–26 September	Italian GT Championship; Italian F4 Championship	2027 Formula Regional European Championship is located in Europe
9	R2	(Italy) Monza Circuit, Monza	24–26 September	Italian GT Championship; Italian F4 Championship	2027 Formula Regional European Championship is located in Europe
10	R1	(Spain) Circuit de Barcelona-Catalunya, Montmeló	8–10 October	International GT Open; Euroformula Open Championship; GT Cup Open Europe; Italian F4 Championship	2027 Formula Regional European Championship is located in Europe
10	R2	(Spain) Circuit de Barcelona-Catalunya, Montmeló	8–10 October	International GT Open; Euroformula Open Championship; GT Cup Open Europe; Italian F4 Championship	2027 Formula Regional European Championship is located in Europe

== Championship standings ==
=== Scoring system ===
Points will be awarded to the top ten classified finishers, along with bonus points for the drivers taking pole position in qualifying and setting the fastest lap in the top ten, as shown below:

Position	1st	2nd	3rd	4th	5th	6th	7th	8th	9th	10th	Pole	FL
Points	25	18	15	12	10	8	6	4	2	1	2	1
