= 2027 Eurocup-3 season =

Season of motorsport championship

The 2027 Eurocup-3 season is scheduled to be the fifth season of the Eurocup-3 series. Eurocup-3 is a multi-event motor racing championship for single-seater open wheel formula racing cars held across Europe, created in 2023 as an alternative to the FIA-sanctioned Formula Regional European Championship and the Euroformula Open championship.

2027 will also see the third edition of the Eurocup-3 Spanish Winter Championship, held across the Iberian Peninsula in February and March.

== Main series ==
=== Teams and drivers ===
All teams will utilize a Dallara 326 chassis powered by a Toyota three-cylinder 1.6-litre turbo engine on Hankook tires.

Team	No.	Driver	Status	Rounds
(United Kingdom) Hitech	TBA	(Brazil) Bernardo Bernoldi	R	TBC
(United Kingdom) Hitech	TBA	(Argentina) Gino Trappa		TBC
(Netherlands) MP Motorsport	TBA	(Poland) Borys Łyżeń	R	TBC

Icon	Legend
R	Rookie

=== Calendar ===
The schedule was announced on 23 September 2026. The championship will debut at the Hockenheimring and return to Circuit de Spa-Francorchamps, where it last competed in 2025, while the Circuito de Jerez and the Autodromo Nazionale Monza dropped off the schedule. Three of the rounds will be held using the three-round format that adds a sprint race to the weekend.

Round		Circuit	Date	Support bill	Map of circuit locations
1	R1	(France) Circuit Paul Ricard, Le Castellet	30 April—2 May	European Le Mans Series; Le Mans Cup; Ligier European Series	2027 Eurocup-3 season is located in Europe
1	SR	(France) Circuit Paul Ricard, Le Castellet	30 April—2 May	European Le Mans Series; Le Mans Cup; Ligier European Series	2027 Eurocup-3 season is located in Europe
1	R2	(France) Circuit Paul Ricard, Le Castellet	30 April—2 May	European Le Mans Series; Le Mans Cup; Ligier European Series	2027 Eurocup-3 season is located in Europe
2	R1	(Germany) Hockenheimring, Hockenheim	7–9 May	ADAC Hockenheim Historic - Das Jim Clark Revival	2027 Eurocup-3 season is located in Europe
2	R2	(Germany) Hockenheimring, Hockenheim	7–9 May	ADAC Hockenheim Historic - Das Jim Clark Revival	2027 Eurocup-3 season is located in Europe
3	R1	(Belgium) Circuit de Spa-Francorchamps, Stavelot	28–30 May	Spa Euro Race	2027 Eurocup-3 season is located in Europe
3	R2	(Belgium) Circuit de Spa-Francorchamps, Stavelot	28–30 May	Spa Euro Race	2027 Eurocup-3 season is located in Europe
4	R1	(Italy) Imola Circuit, Imola	2–4 July	European Le Mans Series; Porsche Carrera Cup France; Porsche Carrera Cup Benelux	2027 Eurocup-3 season is located in Europe
4	SR	(Italy) Imola Circuit, Imola	2–4 July	European Le Mans Series; Porsche Carrera Cup France; Porsche Carrera Cup Benelux	2027 Eurocup-3 season is located in Europe
4	R2	(Italy) Imola Circuit, Imola	2–4 July	European Le Mans Series; Porsche Carrera Cup France; Porsche Carrera Cup Benelux	2027 Eurocup-3 season is located in Europe
5	R1	(Portugal) Algarve International Circuit, Portimão	16–18 July	F4 Spanish Championship; Eurocup-5	2027 Eurocup-3 season is located in Europe
5	SR	(Portugal) Algarve International Circuit, Portimão	16–18 July	F4 Spanish Championship; Eurocup-5	2027 Eurocup-3 season is located in Europe
5	R2	(Portugal) Algarve International Circuit, Portimão	16–18 July	F4 Spanish Championship; Eurocup-5	2027 Eurocup-3 season is located in Europe
6	R1	(United Kingdom) Silverstone Circuit, Silverstone	3–5 September	European Le Mans Series; Le Mans Cup; Ligier European Series	2027 Eurocup-3 season is located in Europe
6	R2	(United Kingdom) Silverstone Circuit, Silverstone	3–5 September	European Le Mans Series; Le Mans Cup; Ligier European Series	2027 Eurocup-3 season is located in Europe
7	R1	(Hungary) Hungaroring, Mogyoród	24–26 September	Formula 4 CEZ Championship	2027 Eurocup-3 season is located in Europe
7	R2	(Hungary) Hungaroring, Mogyoród	24–26 September	Formula 4 CEZ Championship	2027 Eurocup-3 season is located in Europe
8	R1	(Spain) Circuit de Barcelona-Catalunya, Montmeló	29–31 October	TCR Europe Touring Car Series; GB3 Championship; F4 Spanish Championship; Eurocup-5	2027 Eurocup-3 season is located in Europe
8	R2	(Spain) Circuit de Barcelona-Catalunya, Montmeló	29–31 October	TCR Europe Touring Car Series; GB3 Championship; F4 Spanish Championship; Eurocup-5	2027 Eurocup-3 season is located in Europe

== Winter series ==
The third running of the Eurocup-3 Spanish Winter Championship is scheduled to be held over three weekends and will comprise nine races.

=== Teams and drivers ===
Teams will utilize the same Dallara 326 chassis powered by a Toyota three-cylinder 1.6-litre turbo engine and running Hankook tires used in the main series.

=== Calendar ===
The schedule was announced on 1 September 2026. The winter series will race at the same three circuits it did in 2026. All three events will be held using the three-round format that adds a sprint race to the weekend.

Round		Circuit	Date	Support bill	Map of circuit locations
1	R1	(Portugal) Algarve International Circuit, Portimão	12–14 February	Eurocup-4 SWC	2027 Eurocup-3 season is located in Iberia
1	SR	(Portugal) Algarve International Circuit, Portimão	12–14 February	Eurocup-4 SWC	2027 Eurocup-3 season is located in Iberia
1	R2	(Portugal) Algarve International Circuit, Portimão	12–14 February	Eurocup-4 SWC	2027 Eurocup-3 season is located in Iberia
2	R1	(Spain) Circuito del Jarama, San Sebastián de los Reyes	26–28 February	Eurocup-4 SWC	2027 Eurocup-3 season is located in Iberia
2	SR	(Spain) Circuito del Jarama, San Sebastián de los Reyes	26–28 February	Eurocup-4 SWC	2027 Eurocup-3 season is located in Iberia
2	R2	(Spain) Circuito del Jarama, San Sebastián de los Reyes	26–28 February	Eurocup-4 SWC	2027 Eurocup-3 season is located in Iberia
3	R1	(Spain) MotorLand Aragón, Alcañiz	12–14 March	Eurocup-4 SWC	2027 Eurocup-3 season is located in Iberia
3	SR	(Spain) MotorLand Aragón, Alcañiz	12–14 March	Eurocup-4 SWC	2027 Eurocup-3 season is located in Iberia
3	R2	(Spain) MotorLand Aragón, Alcañiz	12–14 March	Eurocup-4 SWC	2027 Eurocup-3 season is located in Iberia

=== Championship standings ===
==== Scoring system ====
For the first and last races of the weekend, points will be awarded to the top ten classified finishers, along with bonus points for pole position and fastest lap, as follows:

Position	1st	2nd	3rd	4th	5th	6th	7th	8th	9th	10th	Pole	FL
Points	25	18	15	12	10	8	6	4	2	1	2	1

The reverse-grid second race of the weekend, called the sprint race, is shorter and therefore will award reduced points along with a bonus point for fastest lap, as follows:

Position	1st	2nd	3rd	4th	5th	6th	7th	8th	9th	10th	FL
Points	10	9	8	7	6	5	4	3	2	1	1
