= Roundhouse Skierniewice =

Coordinates: 51°57′56″N 20°08′34″E

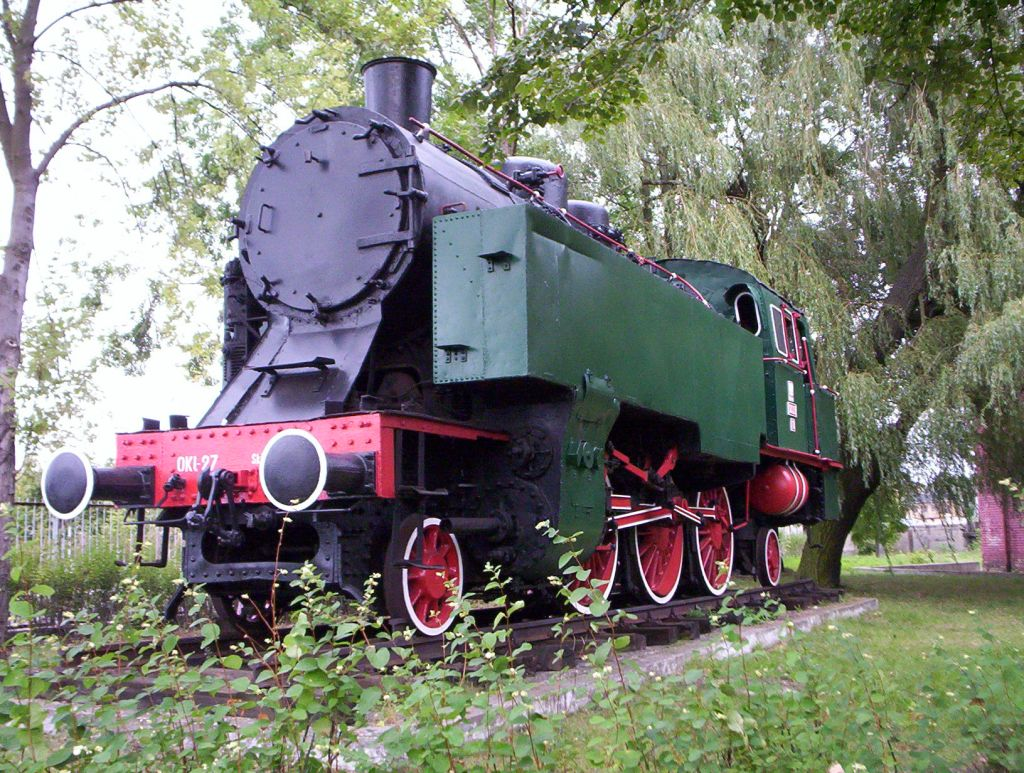
OKl27 in museum

The Roundhouse in Skierniewice (Polish: Parowozownia Skierniewice) was built in 1845 and used until 1991. Currently the Polish Association of Railway Enthusiasts (PSMK) runs a museum exhibition here.

== Exhibits (examples) ==
- Steam locomotives: Ty51, TKi3, Ol49, OKl27
- Diesel locomotives: LS40, SP30
- Electric locomotives: AEG 4184, EP03-08
- Freight cars
- Passenger rail cars
- Draisines
- Railway equipment
