= Szczepan Pieniążek =

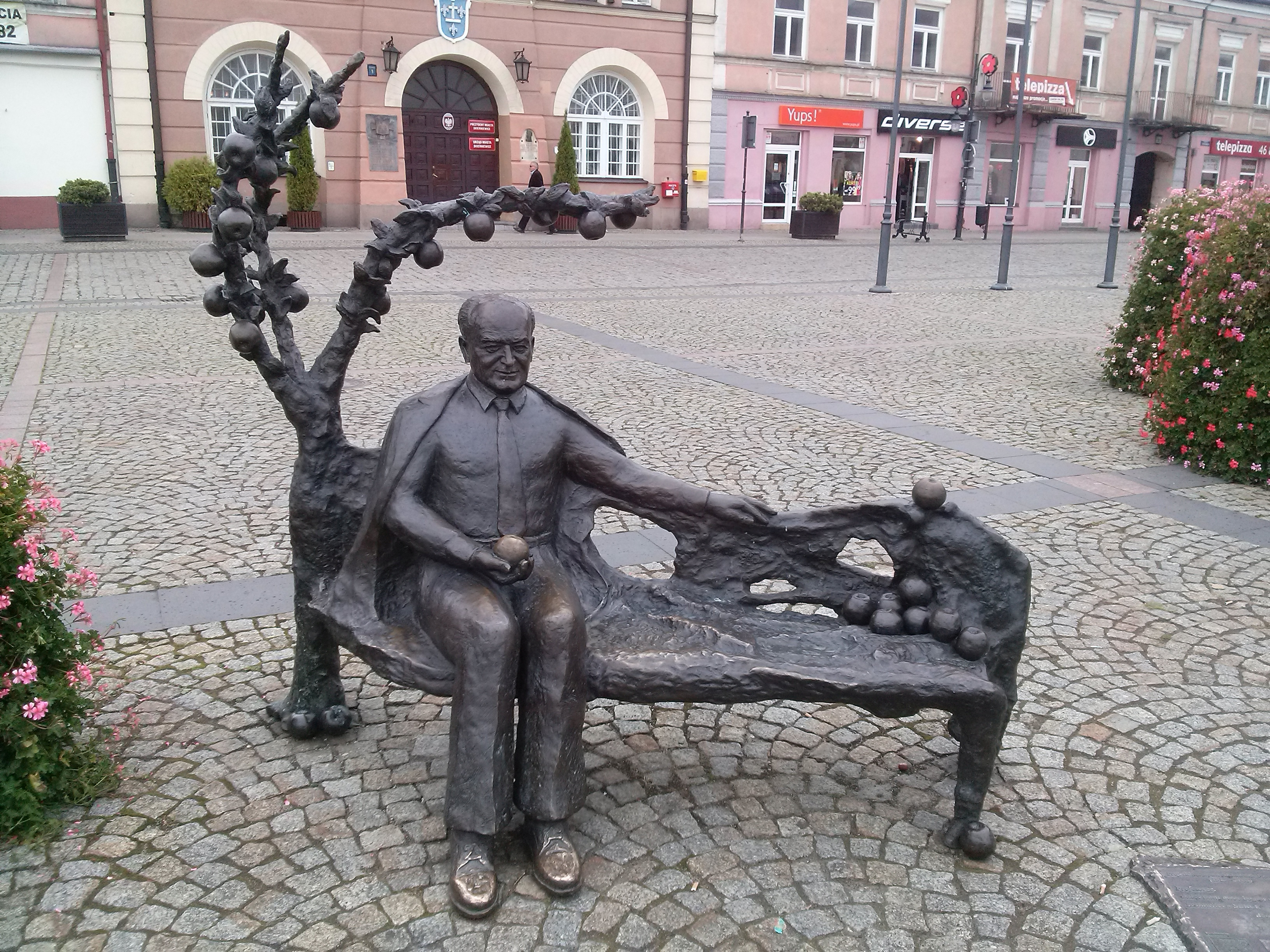
- statue commemorating Professor Pieniazek in the market square in Skierniewice
- Born: December 27, 1913; Słup, Garwolin County
- Died: July 1, 2008 (aged 94); Konstancin-Jeziorna
- Burial place: Bródno Cemetery
- Occupation: Pomologist
- Employer: Warsaw University of Life Sciences
- Spouse: Janina Praska
- Children: daughter Emilia Mroczkowska, son Norman

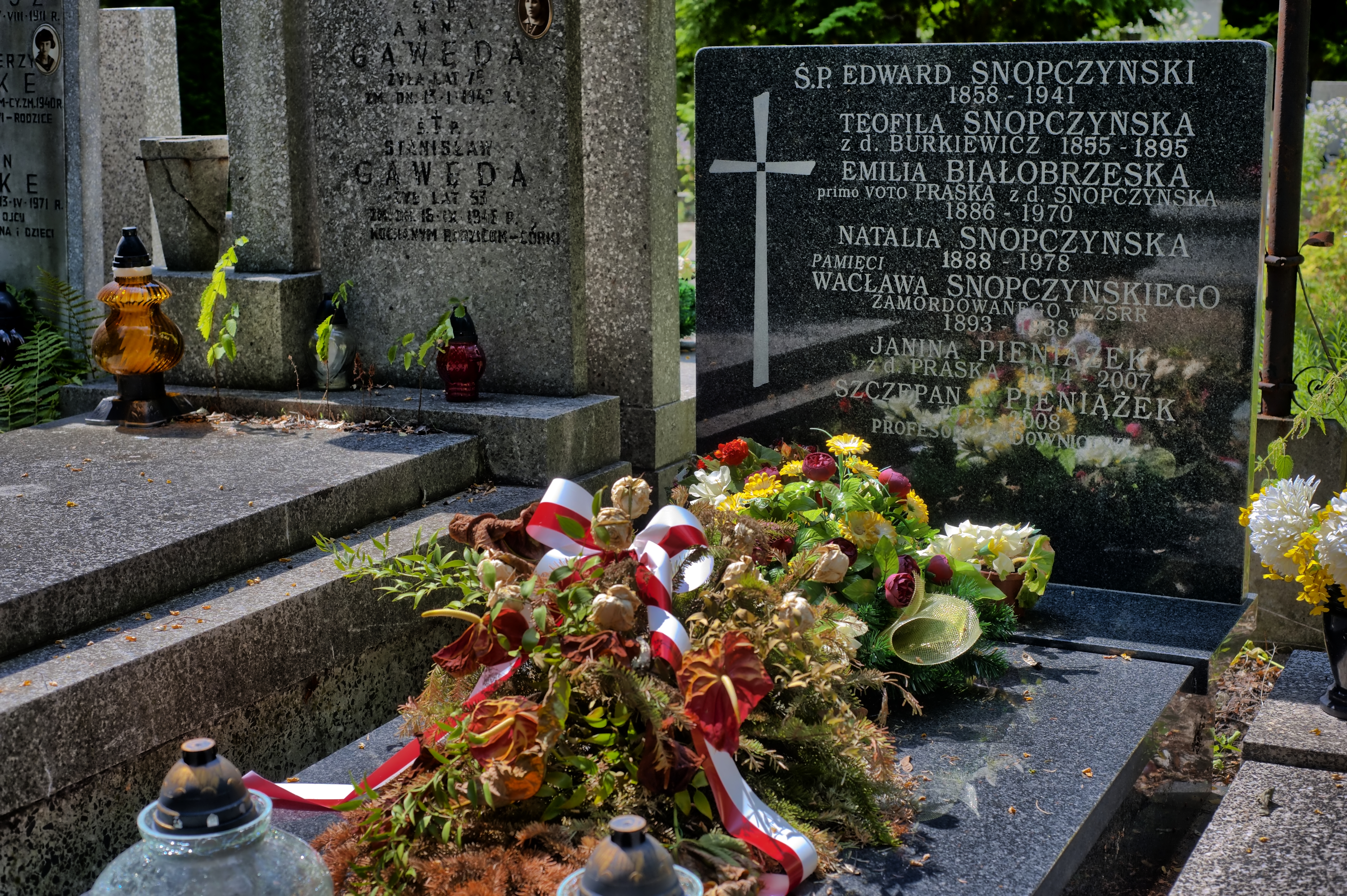
Grave of Szczepan Pieniazek in Warsaw's Bródno Cemetery

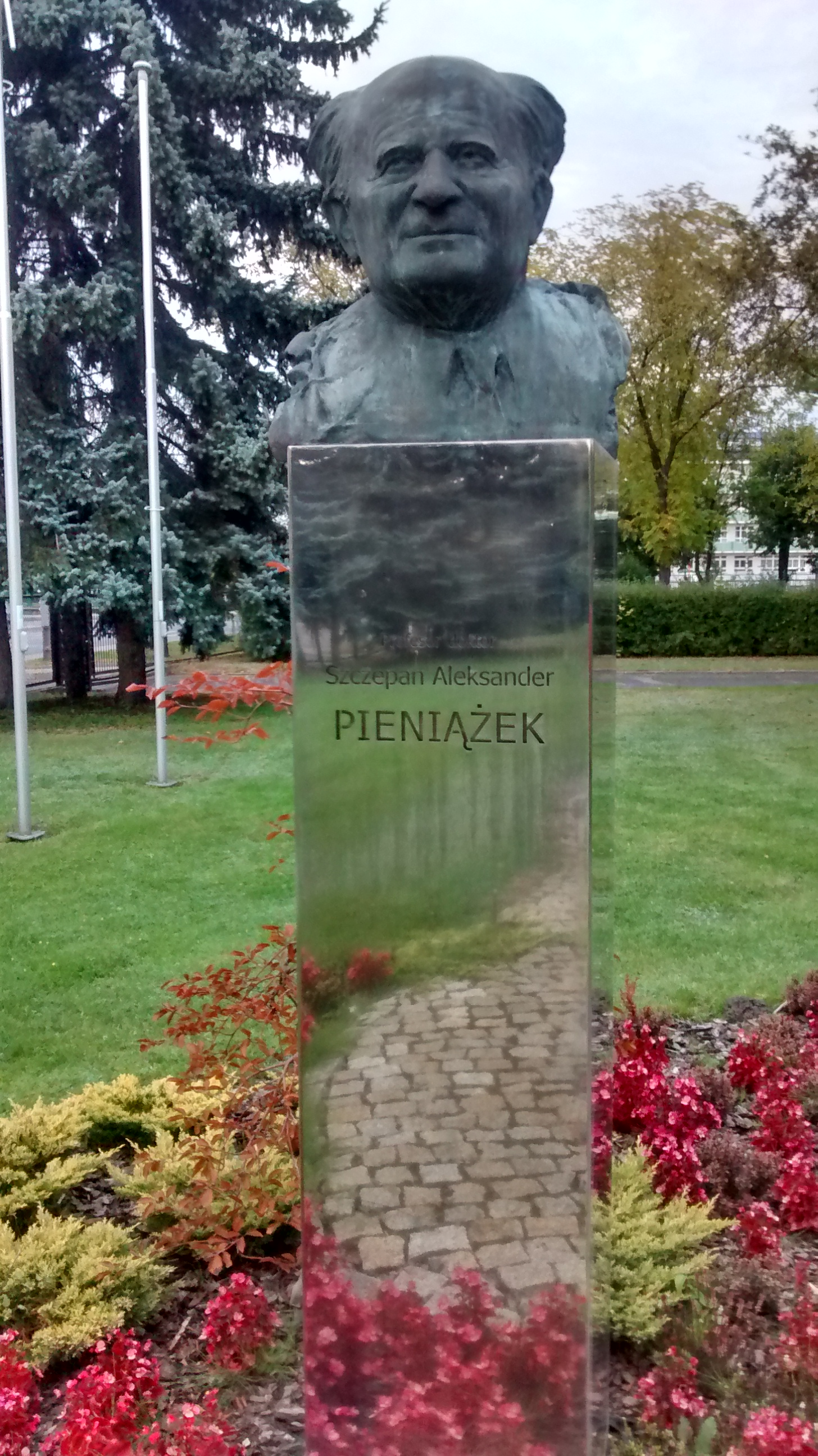
Bust of Professor Szczepan Pieniążek in Skierniewice

Szczepan Aleksander Pieniążek (1913–2008) was a Polish pomologist, professor of the Warsaw University of Life Sciences, and a vice-president of the Polish Academy of Sciences. He was a pioneer in Polish horticulture, which was in need of reform after World War II. Having studied in the United States, Pieniążek brought to Poland innovative solutions to various fruit-growing problems. In his scientific research, he generally focused on pomology, plant physiology, and conservation of orchards. He published over one hundred publications, including an academic handbook "Horticulture".

== Studies and scientific interests ==
After graduating with a Master's in Biology at the University of Warsaw in 1938, he received a scholarship from the Jozef Pilsudski National Culture Fund and left for the United States, where he continued his studies at Cornell University in Ithaca, New York (1938–1942). After defending his doctoral dissertation entitled "Transpiration of apples in cold storage" in 1942 he accepted a position as Assistant Professor at the Department of Horticulture at Rhode Island State College (now University of Rhode Island), where he worked until the spring of 1946.

After the end of World War II, he returned to Poland in April 1946 and began working at the Faculty of Horticulture at the Warsaw University of Life Sciences as an associate professor and head of the Department of Horticulture. He served as the dean of the Faculty of Horticulture between 1965 and 1966. During the anti-Semitic and anti-student campaign of the March 1968 Polish political crisis, he defended the Jewish relegated students and, together with several other professors, signed a letter to the government protesting the expulsion Jewish professors from the university. As a result of pressure from party authorities, he was forced to resign from his position at the Warsaw University of Life Sciences.

After the founding of the Institute of Pomology in Skierniewice in 1951, he became its first director and held this position until his retirement in 1984. In 1952 he became a member of the Polish United Workers' Party, and in 1954 he obtained the title of full professor.

In 1947, Szczepan Pieniążek established cooperation with the Church of the Brethren, an American religious organization, with which he established a Polish-American agricultural exchange. As a result of this cooperation, by the end of 1989, over 1,300 people, mainly Polish farmers, left for annual internships in the USA. A one-year and sometimes longer stay in the USA allowed them to learn about the most modern methods of fruit/vegetable production and allowed them to accumulate savings, which they spent on expanding and modernizing their own farms. In addition to trips to the US for internships of practitioners, Pieniążek organized visits of Polish scientists dealing with horticulture on scholarships to primarily American agricultural universities, which allowed them to obtain doctoral degrees and professorship nominations. He was also the head of the British Council Władysław Filewicz scholarship created by Dr. Irena Modlibowska in England, which allowed several dozen scientists from Poland to complete internships at various research institutes in Great Britain.

In 1964, Szczepan Pieniążek became a full member of the Polish Academy of Sciences (PAN). In the years 1966–1971 he was secretary of the Faculty of Agricultural and Forest Sciences of the Polish Academy of Sciences and vice president of the Polish Academy of Sciences. In the years 1972–1974 he was also the chairman of the Committee of Horticultural Sciences of the Polish Academy of Sciences. Szczepan Pieniążek was a member of the International Society for Horticultural Sciences, chairman of the Horticultural Section, vice-president, then president (1970–1974).

In his scientific work, Szczepan Pieniążek dealt with widely understood pomology, including the cultivation of fruit trees and berry plants, the protection of orchards, as well as plant physiology. Some of his most important achievements are bringing about the annual fruiting of apple trees of alternately fruiting varieties, introducing low-growing trees to cultivation, developing modern soil care systems, and introducing many valuable apple varieties into production. He has published about 100 scientific papers. He published an academic textbook entitled "Orcharding", which was published in 11 editions - (the last in 2000), and the author of popular science books on fruit-growing "Around the orchard world" (1965) translated into: Czech, Bulgarian, and Hungarian and "When apple trees bloom" (1971 r.) translated into Czech.

During Stalinism in Poland, Pieniążek was an active exponent of the ideas of Ivan Michurin and Lysenkoism, which claimed that genes do not participate in inheritance. After a few years, he entirely withdrew his support from the theory. In his memoir, he wrote “ze moje opowiedzenie sie za genetyka lysenkowska stanowi najciemniejsza jego karte…powinienem wiecej kierowac sie rozumem niz entuzjazmem” “My support of Lysenko’s theory was the darkest card in my life…I should use my brain rather than believe the enthusiasm alone”. From the works of Michurin, Pieniążek appreciated the views concerning the cultivation of low-growing varieties of fruit trees commonly considered the most valuable. In the same period, he acted to defend fruit growers and vegetable gardeners against excessive taxation and collectivization and to keep their farms in private hands.

The result of these activities was the continuous presence of fruit and vegetables on the Polish market, while there was often a shortage of other agricultural products in those years. Before World War II apple production was 400-600 thousand metric tons per year, and in 1983, when he retired, it reached over 1.7 million metric tons.

In addition to his scientific activity, Pieniążek was involved in the widely understood popularization of gardening knowledge in Poland by publishing articles in the press on fruit trees and in the 1970s, taking part in weekly TV programs promoting the planting and cultivation of fruit trees and berry plants in home gardens. He also introduced and popularized the growing of so-called Skierniewice lemons (pl. cytryna skierniewicka) in Poland, which was meaningful at the time because of the relative scarcity of imported fruits.

== Personal life ==
He was married to Janina Praska, born on August 28, 1914, in Warsaw, professor of plant physiology (marriage: September 1, 1939 in Ithaca). He had two children (a daughter, Emilia, born in 1942, and a son, Norman, born in 1946). He died on July 1, 2008, in Konstancin-Jeziorna. He was buried at the Bródno Cemetery in Warsaw (avenue 49A, row 1, grave 25). The memory of Professor Pieniążek was commemorated with three monuments: a monument-bench in front of the town hall building in Skierniewice, a bust in front of the building of the Institute of Horticulture in Skierniewice, and a stone obelisk in the market square in Błędów in the Grójec county, funded by local fruit growers.
