= Borys Łyżeń =

Polish racing driver (born 2010)

- Nationality: (Poland) Polish
- Born: 13 December 2010 (age 15) Skierniewice, Poland

F4 Spanish Championship career
- Debut season: 2026
- Current team: KCL Motorsport
- Car number: 21
- Starts: 21
- Wins: 3
- Podiums: 6
- Poles: 2
- Fastest laps: 6
- Best finish: 4th in 2026

Previous series
- 2026 2026: F4 Spanish; Eurocup-4 Spanish Winter
- Statistics up to date as of 15 November 2026.

Borys Łyżeń (born 13 December 2010) is a Polish racing driver who is set to compete in Eurocup-3 for MP Motorsport.

He previously competed in the F4 Spanish Championship in 2026, finishing fourth.

== Career ==
=== Karting ===
Łyżeń started karting in 2015. In 2021 he won the Polish Championship – Mini Max, the Rotax Max Challenge Poland – Mini Max, and came runner-up to the 2021 Rotax Max Challenge Grand Finals – Mini Max all with KRZ Motorsport. He also participated in the 2022 FIA Motorsport Games.

=== Formula 4 (2026) ===
==== 2026 ====
In late 2025, Łyżeń took part in the Richard Mille Young Talent Academy shootout for a seat in the 2026 F4 Spanish Championship and reached the finals, but did not win the seat. Despite losing, he was announced to be competing in both the F4 Spanish Championship and it's Winter Series, the Eurocup-4 Spanish Winter Championship, for KCL Motorsport, a subsidiary of MP Motorsport. In the Eurocup-4 Spanish Winter Championship, he achieved his first podium and motor race win in the sprint race of the second round at Circuito del Jarama. He collected one more podium in the sprint race of the third and final round at MotorLand Aragón and ended the championship eighth in the standings.

Just before his campaign in F4 Spain, he took part in the season opener of the AU4 Australian Championship held at Winton Motor Raceway, driving for F4 Racing Australia Lana Flack Racing. He got a podium on debut and currently lies tenth in the standings.

For his main campaign in F4 Spain, he started out of the season at Circuit Ricardo Tormo, where he achieved a podium in the third race. In the second round at Algarve International Circuit he collected his maiden wins in the first two races. At Aragón, he came fifth in the third race. He started the first and second races of the fourth round at Jarama on pole position for the first time. Łyżeń converted his first pole to a second place and his second pole to his third race win of the season.

=== Formula Regional (2027) ===
MP Motorsport retained Łyżeń as he steps up to Eurocup-3 for 2027.

== Personal life ==
He has been a member of the Orlen Young Drivers Academy since 2025 and is mentored and coached by former racing driver Tomasz Krzemiński. His idol is Ayrton Senna.

== Karting record ==
=== Karting career summary ===
Season	Series	Team	Position
2021	WSK Champions Cup – 60 Mini	KRZ Motorsport	NC
2021	Polish Championship – Mini Max	KRZ Motorsport	1st
2021	Rotax Max Challenge Poland – Mini Max	KRZ Motorsport	1st
2021	Rotax Max Challenge Grand Finals – Mini Max	KRZ Motorsport	2nd
2021	49° Trofeo Della Industrie – Mini	Kidix Srl	14th
2021	South Garda Winter Cup – Mini ROK	Kidix Srl	NC
2021	WSK Final Cup – 60 Mini	Kidix Srl	23rd
2022	WSK Super Master Series – 60 Mini	Alonso Kart by Kidix	29th
2022	WSK Euro Series – 60 Mini	Alonso Kart by Kidix	48th
2022	Trofeo South Garda Karting – Mini GR3	Alonso Kart by Kidix	11th
2022	Italian ACI Karting Championship – Mini	Alonso Kart by Kidix	27th
2022	WSK Final Cup – OK Junior	Koski Motorsport	73rd
2022	FIA Motorsport Games Sprint Cup – Junior	Poland	12th
2023	WSK Champions Cup – OK Junior	Koski Motorsport	NC
2023	WSK Super Master Series – OK Junior	Koski Motorsport	68th
2023	Champions of the Future – OK Junior	Koski Motorsport	24th
2023	CIK-FIA European Championship – OK Junior	Koski Motorsport	NC
2023	CIK-FIA World Championship – OK Junior	KRZ Motorsport	NC
2023	Polish Championship – OK Junior	KRZ Motorsport	2nd
2023	ROK Superfinal – Junior ROK		12th
2023	WSK Final Cup – OK Junior	Sodikart	34th
2024	WSK Champions Cup – OK Junior	Sodikart	13th
2024	WSK Super Master Series – OK Junior	Sodikart	47th
2024	Champions of the Future – OK Junior	Sodikart	13th
2024	CIK-FIA European Championship – OK Junior	Sodikart	20th
2024	WSK Euro Series – OK Junior	Sodikart	12th
2024	CIK-FIA World Championship – OK Junior	Sodikart	29th
2024	WSK Final Cup – OK	KRZ Motorsport	22nd
2025	WSK Super Master Series – OK	KRZ Motorsport	21st
2025	Champions of the Future – OK	KRZ Motorsport	106th
2025	CIK-FIA European Championship – OK	KRZ Motorsport	21st
2025	CIK-FIA World Championship – OK	KRZ Motorsport	19th

== Racing record ==
=== Racing career summary ===
Season	Series	Team	Races	Wins	Poles	F/Laps	Podiums	Points	Position
2026	Eurocup-4 Spanish Winter Championship	KCL Motorsport	9	1	0	1	2	49	8th
2026	F4 Spanish Championship	KCL Motorsport	21	3	2	6	6	188	4th
2026	AU4 Australian Championship	F4 Racing Australia Lana Flack Racing	3	0	0	0	1	25	12th
2027	Eurocup-3	MP Motorsport	0	0	0	0	0	0	TBD

^{*} Season still in progress.

=== Complete Eurocup-4 Spanish Winter Championship results ===
(key) (Races in bold indicate pole position) (Races in italics indicate fastest lap)

Year	Team	1	2	3	4	5	6	7	8	9	DC	Points
2026	KCL Motorsport	POR; 1; 11	POR; SPR; 13	POR; 2; 20	JAR; 1; 8	JAR; SPR; 1	JAR; 2; 8	ARA; 1; 5	ARA; SPR; 3	ARA; 2; 4	8th	49

=== Complete F4 Spanish Championship results ===
(key) (Races in bold indicate pole position; races in italics indicate fastest lap)

Year	Entrant	1	2	3	4	5	6	7	8	9	10	11	12	13	14	15	16	17	18	19	20	21	Pos	Points
2026	KCL Motorsport	CRT; 1; 9	CRT; 2; 6	CRT; 3; 2	POR; 1; 1	POR; 2; 1	POR; 3; 22	ARA; 1; 25	ARA; 2; 10	ARA; 3; 5	**JAR**; **1**; 2	**JAR**; **2**; 1	JAR; 3; 17	JER; 1	JER; 2	JER; 3	NAV; 1	NAV; 2	NAV; 3	CAT; 1	CAT; 2	CAT; 3	2nd*	122*

* Season still in progress.

=== Complete AU4 Australian Championship results ===
(key) (Races in bold indicate pole position; races in italics indicate fastest lap)

Year	Entrant	1	2	3	4	5	6	7	8	9	10	11	12	13	14	15	Pos	Points
2026	F4 Racing Australia Lana Flack Racing	WIN; 1; 3	WIN; 2; 5	WIN; 2 Ret	SYD1; 1	SYD1; 2	SYD1; 2	BND1; 1	BND1; 2	BND1; 2	BND2; 1	BND2; 2	BND2; 2	SYD2; 1	SYD2; 2	SYD2; 2	10th*	25*

* Season still in progress.
