= 2026 AU4 Australian Championship =

Motorsport season

The 2026 AU4 Australian Championship was a motor racing competition being held in Australia for Formula 4 cars. It is the eighth national championship in Formula 4, and the second under the name of AU4. The season commenced at Winton Motor Raceway on May 1 and was finished at Queensland Raceway at September 27.

Jensen Marold claimed the Gen 2 title after a season-long battle with Marco Manson, taking his second AU4 title after claiming Gen 1 honours the previous season. The Gen 1 title was won by Jackson Culver courtesy of a strong, consistent campaign.

== Main series ==
=== Calendar ===
The following circuits hosted a round of the 2026 championship.

Round	Circuit	Dates	Map
1	(Victoria (state)) Winton Motor Raceway (National Circuit)	1–3 May	2026 AU4 Australian Championship is located in Australia
2	(New South Wales) Sydney Motorsport Park (Gardner Circuit)	30–31 May	2026 AU4 Australian Championship is located in Australia
3	(South Australia) The Bend Motorsport Park (West Circuit)	17–19 July	2026 AU4 Australian Championship is located in Australia
4	(South Australia) The Bend Motorsport Park (International Circuit)	21–23 August	2026 AU4 Australian Championship is located in Australia
5	(New South Wales) Queensland Raceway (National Circuit)	25–27 September	2026 AU4 Australian Championship is located in Australia

=== Teams and drivers ===
Team	No.	Drivers	Class	Rounds
AGI Sport	4	(Australia) Rugby Mangan	G1	All
AGI Sport	6	(Australia) Koby Wilson	G1	All
AGI Sport	7	(Australia) Rixon Salvino	G1	3–4
AGI Sport	12	(New Zealand) Jackson Culver	G1	All
AGI Sport	15	(Australia) Martin Dudley	G1	All
AGI Sport	28	(New Zealand) William Beck	G2	All
AGI Sport	31	(Australia) Jensen Marold	G2	All
AGI Sport	41	(Australia) Xavier Babbage-Hockey	G2	All
AGI Sport	52	(Australia) Matteo Kazaglis	G1	1–2
AGI Sport	66	(Australia) Lewis Gotch	G1	All
AGI Sport	90	(Australia) Luca Cosolo	G2	All
Waltec Motorsport	9	(Australia) Jamie-Lee Su	G2	2–5
Tim Macrow Racing	17	(Australia) Angus Baills	G2	All
Tim Macrow Racing	25	(Australia) Joe Imbrogno	G2	4–5
Tim Macrow Racing	30	(Australia) Brock Burton	G2	All
Tim Macrow Racing	69	(New Zealand) Marco Manson	G2	All
Tim Macrow Racing	73	(Australia) De'Argo Stewart	G2	All
Tim Macrow Racing	88	(Australia) Anton Du	G2	1–4
F4 Racing Australia; Lana Flack Racing	20	(Poland) Borys Łyżeń	G2	1
F4 Racing Australia; Lana Flack Racing	40	(Australia) Lana Flack	G2	All

Icon	Class
G2	Gen 2
G1	Gen 1

=== Results and standings ===
==== Season summary ====
Rnd.		Circuit	Gen 2				Gen 1			
Rnd.		Circuit	Pole position	Fastest lap	Winning driver	Winning team	Pole position	Fastest lap	Winning driver	Winning team
1	R1	(Victoria (state)) Winton	(Australia) Jensen Marold	(Australia) Jensen Marold	(Australia) Jensen Marold	AGI Sport	(Australia) Koby Wilson	(Australia) Koby Wilson	(Australia) Koby Wilson	AGI Sport
1	R2	(Victoria (state)) Winton		(Australia) Jensen Marold	(Australia) Jensen Marold	AGI Sport		(Australia) Koby Wilson	(New Zealand) Jackson Culver	AGI Sport
1	R3	(Victoria (state)) Winton	(Australia) Jensen Marold	(New Zealand) Marco Manson	(New Zealand) Marco Manson	Tim Macrow Racing	(New Zealand) Jackson Culver	(New Zealand) Jackson Culver	(New Zealand) Jackson Culver	AGI Sport
2	R1	(New South Wales) Sydney	(Australia) Jensen Marold	(Australia) Jensen Marold	(Australia) Jensen Marold	AGI Sport	(Australia) Koby Wilson	(Australia) Koby Wilson	(Australia) Koby Wilson	AGI Sport
2	R2	(New South Wales) Sydney		(Australia) Jensen Marold	(New Zealand) Marco Manson	Tim Macrow Racing		(Australia) Lewis Gotch	(Australia) Koby Wilson	AGI Sport
2	R3	(New South Wales) Sydney	(Australia) Jensen Marold	(New Zealand) Marco Manson	(New Zealand) Marco Manson	Tim Macrow Racing	(Australia) Koby Wilson	(Australia) Koby Wilson	(Australia) Koby Wilson	AGI Sport
3	R1	(South Australia) The Bend	(Australia) Jensen Marold	(New Zealand) Marco Manson	(Australia) Jensen Marold	AGI Sport	(Australia) Lewis Gotch	(Australia) Lewis Gotch	(Australia) Lewis Gotch	AGI Sport
3	R2	(South Australia) The Bend		(Australia) Jensen Marold	(New Zealand) Marco Manson	Tim Macrow Racing		(New Zealand) Jackson Culver	(Australia) Lewis Gotch	AGI Sport
3	R3	(South Australia) The Bend	(Australia) Jensen Marold	(Australia) Jensen Marold	(Australia) Jensen Marold	AGI Sport	(Australia) Lewis Gotch	(Australia) Lewis Gotch	(Australia) Lewis Gotch	AGI Sport
4	R1	(South Australia) The Bend	(New Zealand) William Beck	(New Zealand) William Beck	(New Zealand) Marco Manson	Tim Macrow Racing	(Australia) Lewis Gotch	(New Zealand) Jackson Culver	(Australia) Koby Wilson	AGI Sport
4	R2	(South Australia) The Bend		(Australia) Jensen Marold	(Australia) Jensen Marold	AGI Sport		(New Zealand) Jackson Culver	(New Zealand) Jackson Culver	AGI Sport
4	R3	(South Australia) The Bend	(Australia) Jensen Marold	(Australia) Joe Imbrogno	(New Zealand) Marco Manson	Tim Macrow Racing	(New Zealand) Jackson Culver	(Australia) Koby Wilson	(Australia) Koby Wilson	AGI Sport
5	R1	Queensland	(New Zealand) William Beck	(Australia) Jensen Marold	(Australia) Jensen Marold	AGI Sport	(Australia) Lewis Gotch	(Australia) Lewis Gotch	(Australia) Koby Wilson	AGI Sport
5	R2	Queensland		(New Zealand) Marco Manson	(New Zealand) Marco Manson	Tim Macrow Racing		(Australia) Lewis Gotch	(New Zealand) Jackson Culver	AGI Sport
5	R3	Queensland	(Australia) Jensen Marold	(Australia) Jensen Marold	(Australia) Jensen Marold	AGI Sport	(Australia) Lewis Gotch	(Australia) Koby Wilson	(Australia) Koby Wilson	AGI Sport

==== Championship standings ====
Points are awarded to the top 10 classified finishers in each race. Each round there is also one point for pole position in each of the two qualifying sessions and one point for fastest lap in each of the three races.

Position	1st	2nd	3rd	4th	5th	6th	7th	8th	9th	10th	Pole	FL
Points	25	18	15	12	10	8	6	4	2	1	1	1

===== Gen 2 =====
Pos	Driver	WIN (Victoria (state))			SYD1 (New South Wales)			BND1 (South Australia)			BND2 (South Australia)			SYD2 (New South Wales)			Pts
Pos	Driver	R1	R2	R3	R1	R2	R3	R1	R2	R3	R1	R2	R3	R1	R2	R3	Pts
1	(Australia) Jensen Marold	1	1	7	1	2	2	1	2	1	3	1	5	1	2	1	320
2	(New Zealand) Marco Manson	2	4	1	2	1	1	2	1	2	1	2	1	2	1	3	314
3	(Australia) Luca Cosolo	Ret	2	6	7	4	3	5	9	7	7	6	4	4	3	5	144
4	(New Zealand) William Beck	9	3	2	5	8	7	3	Ret	3	5	4	3	7	8	2	140
5	(Australia) De'Argo Stewart	7	10	5	6	3	15	4	3	4	12	7	Ret	6	5	8	110
6	(Australia) Brock Burton	5	8	Ret	3	15	4	9	14	5	2	13	8	5	6	Ret	96
7	(Australia) Xavier Babbage-Hockey	Ret	9	4	4	13	13	7	4	8	17	3	9	9	10	4	84
8	(Australia) Angus Baills	4	7	3	Ret	6	5	6	6	9	6	17	6	8	Ret	7	80
9	(Australia) Lana Flack	6	6	Ret	7	5	6	8	5	6	8	8	7	11	9	9	78
10	(Australia) Joe Imbrogno										4	5	2	3	4	6	76
11	(Australia) Jamie-Lee Su				Ret	11	9	13	10	10	18	10	10	10	7	10	25
12	(Poland) Borys Łyżeń	3	5	Ret													10
13	(Australia) Anton Du	8	15	Ret	Ret	Ret	Ret	15	13	15	14	15	15				-8
-	(Australia) James Raaymakers				DNS	DNS	DNS										0
Pos	Driver	R1	R2	R3	R1	R2	R3	R1	R2	R3	R1	R2	R3	R1	R2	R3	Pts
Pos	Driver	WIN (Victoria (state))			SYD1 (New South Wales)			BND1 (South Australia)			BND2 (South Australia)			SYD2 (New South Wales)			Pts

===== Gen 1 =====
Pos	Driver	WIN (Victoria (state))			SYD1 (New South Wales)			BND1 (South Australia)			BND2 (South Australia)			SYD2 (New South Wales)			Pts
Pos	Driver	R1	R2	R3	R1	R2	R3	R1	R2	R3	R1	R2	R3	R1	R2	R3	Pts
1	(New Zealand) Jackson Culver	4	1	1	3	3	3	2	2	2	2	1	2	3	1	3	284
2	(Australia) Koby Wilson	1	2	2	1	1	1	3	5	5	1	Ret	1	1	DSQ	1	279
3	(Australia) Lewis Gotch	2	3	3	2	2	2	1	1	1	3	2	DSQ	2	2	2	274
4	(Australia) Martin Dudley	6	5	4	4	5	5	6	4	4	5	5	5	5	4	4	158
5	(Australia) Rugby Mangan	3	4	Ret	Ret	4	4	5	Ret	6	4	4	4	4	3	5	125
6	(Australia) Rixon Salvino							4	3	3	6	3	3				80
7	(Australia) Matteo Kazaglis	5	6	5													30
Pos	Driver	R1	R2	R3	R1	R2	R3	R1	R2	R3	R1	R2	R3	R1	R2	R3	Pts
Pos	Driver	WIN (Victoria (state))			SYD1 (New South Wales)			BND1 (South Australia)			BND2 (South Australia)			SYD2 (New South Wales)			Pts

== Australian Formula Series ==
In addition to the main series, a summer series called the Australian Formula Series was also announced, with three rounds to be held at The Bend Motorsport Park in December 2026.

All cars will use the Tatuus F4 T421 chassis as used in the Gen2 class.

=== Calendar ===
The following circuits are due to host a round of the 2026 Australian Formula Series.

Round	Circuit	Dates	Map
1	(South Australia) The Bend Motorsport Park (West Circuit)	3–6 December	2026 AU4 Australian Championship is located in Australia
2	(South Australia) The Bend Motorsport Park (International Circuit)	14–16 December	2026 AU4 Australian Championship is located in Australia
3	(South Australia) The Bend Motorsport Park (GT Circuit)	18–20 December	2026 AU4 Australian Championship is located in Australia
