= State Higher Vocational School in Skierniewice =

State vocational university in Skierniewice, Poland

Coordinates: 51°56′53″N 20°08′38″E

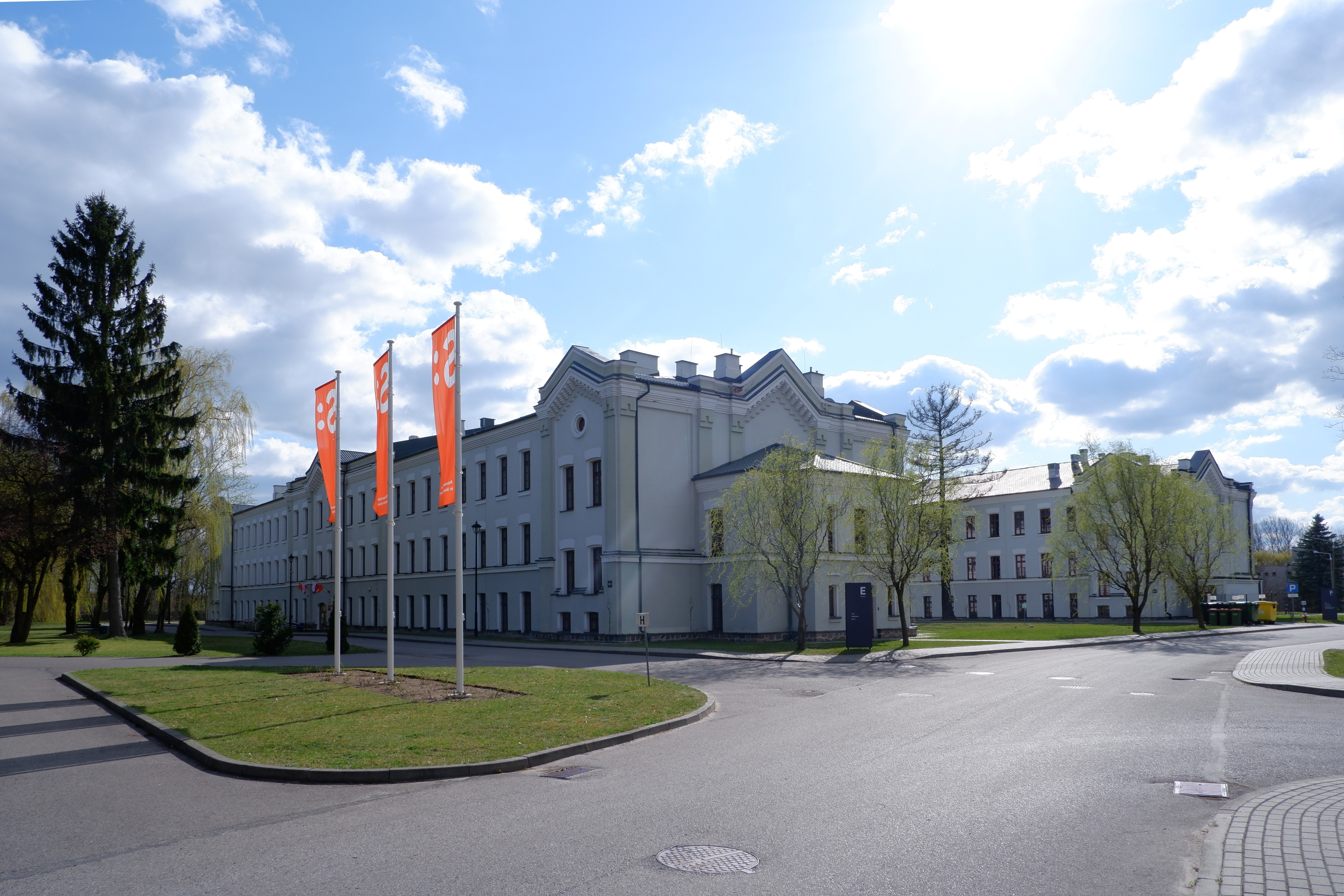
State School of Higher Vocational Education in Skierniewice

The State School of Higher Vocational Education in Skierniewice (pl. Państwowa Wyższa Szkoła Zawodowa w Skierniewicach) is a vocational university founded on 1 October 2005, on the strength of the Ministers’ Council's resolution date of 27 September 2005 (Dz.U. vol.190, paragraph 1605) and offers BS or BA degree (licencjat).

== History ==
The Rector was appointed on 17 October 2005. The first enrollment at the Economics and Sociology Departments in the year 2005/2006 took place on 17–30 October 2005, as a result of which 211 students were admitted. At that time the School used the premises of the Education Centre for Adults in Skierniewice, at 4 Al. Niepodległości.

The enrollment for the academic years 2006/2007 and 2007/2008 took place at four departments: Economics, Sociology, Polish Philology and Horticulture. At the end of September 2008 the School moved premises. At present classes are run in the main school building in Skierniewice, at 64C Batorego Street. Only some classes are held at the old premises, and special laboratory classes are conducted in the SGGW building at 10 Sobieskiego Street.

The School is to receive a large part of a former military complex in Skierniewice at 64 Batorego Street. Part of the Indicative Investment Plan, the town of Skierniewice is going to receive funds necessary to adjust four further buildings to the needs of the School. Plans for the year 2009 include designing and building a new laboratory.

In the elections for the School Authorities in March 2007, the Rector's office was taken by Professor Tadeusz Janusz, that of the Vice-Rector for General Affairs and Development – by Dr Daniel Stos, and that of the Vice-Rector for Student Affairs and Didactics – by Professor Elżbieta Psyk-Piotrowska.

In the academic year of 2006/2007 our students organized the first juwenalia in the history of Skierniewice. They actively participate in integration events (Fuksówka and Połowinki), they have organized the Students’ Sports Club, they take part in the work of Polish Students’ Government, as well as the cultural and social life of Skierniewice.

During the inauguration of the 2007/2008 academic year State Higher Vocational School in Skierniewice received the school banner.

In the year 2008/2009 the School opened two new areas of study: Computer Science and Econometrics and Finance and Accountancy.
