= 2027 Euroformula Open Championship =

2027 formula racing championship

The 2027 Euroformula Open Championship is a planned multi-event open-wheel single-seater motor racing championship scheduled to be held across Europe. It is the fourteenth season using the Euroformula Open name. The season will be held over eight rounds, starting on 9 April at Algarve International Circuit and concluding on 10 October at Circuit de Barcelona-Catalunya.

== Teams and drivers ==
All drivers will compete with a Toyota-powered Dallara 324 car on Pirelli tires.

Team	No.	Driver	Status	Rounds
(United Kingdom) Nitrous Competitions ADM Racing	TBA	TBA		TBC
(United Kingdom) Nitrous Competitions ADM Racing	TBA	TBA		TBC
(United Kingdom) Nitrous Competitions ADM Racing	TBA	TBA		TBC
(Spain) Palou Motorsport	TBA	TBA		TBC
(Spain) Palou Motorsport	TBA	TBA		TBC
(Spain) Palou Motorsport	TBA	TBA		TBC

== Race calendar ==
A provisional eight-round calendar was announced on 17 July 2026. Euroformula Open will support the International GT Open at all eight events. The championship will return to Silverstone Circuit for the first time since 2019, while a later calendar update meant the Hockenheimring dropped off the schedule for the first time since 2023.

Round		Circuit	Date	Support bill	Map of circuit locations
1	R1	(Portugal) Algarve International Circuit, Portimão	9–11 April	International GT Open; Formula Regional European Championship	2027 Euroformula Open Championship is located in Europe
1	R2	(Portugal) Algarve International Circuit, Portimão	9–11 April	International GT Open; Formula Regional European Championship	2027 Euroformula Open Championship is located in Europe
1	R3	(Portugal) Algarve International Circuit, Portimão	9–11 April	International GT Open; Formula Regional European Championship	2027 Euroformula Open Championship is located in Europe
2	R1	(Belgium) Circuit de Spa-Francorchamps, Stavelot	30 April—2 May	International GT Open; GT Cup Open Europe; GB3 Championship	2027 Euroformula Open Championship is located in Europe
2	R2	(Belgium) Circuit de Spa-Francorchamps, Stavelot	30 April—2 May	International GT Open; GT Cup Open Europe; GB3 Championship	2027 Euroformula Open Championship is located in Europe
2	R3	(Belgium) Circuit de Spa-Francorchamps, Stavelot	30 April—2 May	International GT Open; GT Cup Open Europe; GB3 Championship	2027 Euroformula Open Championship is located in Europe
3	R1	(United Kingdom) Silverstone Circuit, Silverstone	14–16 May	International GT Open; Formula Regional European Championship	2027 Euroformula Open Championship is located in Europe
3	R2	(United Kingdom) Silverstone Circuit, Silverstone	14–16 May	International GT Open; Formula Regional European Championship	2027 Euroformula Open Championship is located in Europe
3	R3	(United Kingdom) Silverstone Circuit, Silverstone	14–16 May	International GT Open; Formula Regional European Championship	2027 Euroformula Open Championship is located in Europe
4	R1	(Italy) Misano World Circuit, Misano Adriatico	4–6 June	International GT Open; GT Cup Open Europe	2027 Euroformula Open Championship is located in Europe
4	R2	(Italy) Misano World Circuit, Misano Adriatico	4–6 June	International GT Open; GT Cup Open Europe	2027 Euroformula Open Championship is located in Europe
4	R3	(Italy) Misano World Circuit, Misano Adriatico	4–6 June	International GT Open; GT Cup Open Europe	2027 Euroformula Open Championship is located in Europe
5	R1	(Hungary) Hungaroring, Mogyoród	2–4 July	International GT Open; GT Cup Open Europe; GB3 Championship	2027 Euroformula Open Championship is located in Europe
5	R2	(Hungary) Hungaroring, Mogyoród	2–4 July	International GT Open; GT Cup Open Europe; GB3 Championship	2027 Euroformula Open Championship is located in Europe
5	R3	(Hungary) Hungaroring, Mogyoród	2–4 July	International GT Open; GT Cup Open Europe; GB3 Championship	2027 Euroformula Open Championship is located in Europe
6	R1	(France) Circuit Paul Ricard, Le Castellet	16–18 July	International GT Open; Formula Regional European Championship; GT Cup Open Europe; E4 Championship	2027 Euroformula Open Championship is located in Europe
6	R2	(France) Circuit Paul Ricard, Le Castellet	16–18 July	International GT Open; Formula Regional European Championship; GT Cup Open Europe; E4 Championship	2027 Euroformula Open Championship is located in Europe
6	R3	(France) Circuit Paul Ricard, Le Castellet	16–18 July	International GT Open; Formula Regional European Championship; GT Cup Open Europe; E4 Championship	2027 Euroformula Open Championship is located in Europe
7	R1	(Italy) Monza Circuit, Monza	17–19 September	International GT Open; GT Cup Open Europe	2027 Euroformula Open Championship is located in Europe
7	R2	(Italy) Monza Circuit, Monza	17–19 September	International GT Open; GT Cup Open Europe	2027 Euroformula Open Championship is located in Europe
7	R3	(Italy) Monza Circuit, Monza	17–19 September	International GT Open; GT Cup Open Europe	2027 Euroformula Open Championship is located in Europe
8	R1	(Spain) Circuit de Barcelona-Catalunya, Montmeló	8–10 October	International GT Open; GT Cup Open Europe; Formula Regional European Championship; Italian F4 Championship	2027 Euroformula Open Championship is located in Europe
8	R2	(Spain) Circuit de Barcelona-Catalunya, Montmeló	8–10 October	International GT Open; GT Cup Open Europe; Formula Regional European Championship; Italian F4 Championship	2027 Euroformula Open Championship is located in Europe
8	R3	(Spain) Circuit de Barcelona-Catalunya, Montmeló	8–10 October	International GT Open; GT Cup Open Europe; Formula Regional European Championship; Italian F4 Championship	2027 Euroformula Open Championship is located in Europe

== Championship standings ==
=== Drivers' championship ===
Points will be awarded as follows:

Position	1st	2nd	3rd	4th	5th	6th	7th	8th	9th	10th	Pole	FL
Points	25	18	15	12	10	8	6	4	2	1	1	1

Each drivers' three worst scores (excluding disqualifications) will be dropped.

=== Rookies' championship ===
Points will be awarded as follows:

Position	1st	2nd	3rd	4th	5th
Points	10	8	6	4	3

Each drivers' three worst scores (excluding disqualifications) will be dropped.

=== Teams' championship ===
Points will be awarded according to the same structure as in the rookies' championship, with each team nominating two drivers to score teams' championship points ahead of the round and non-nominated drivers not scoring nor blocking points.
