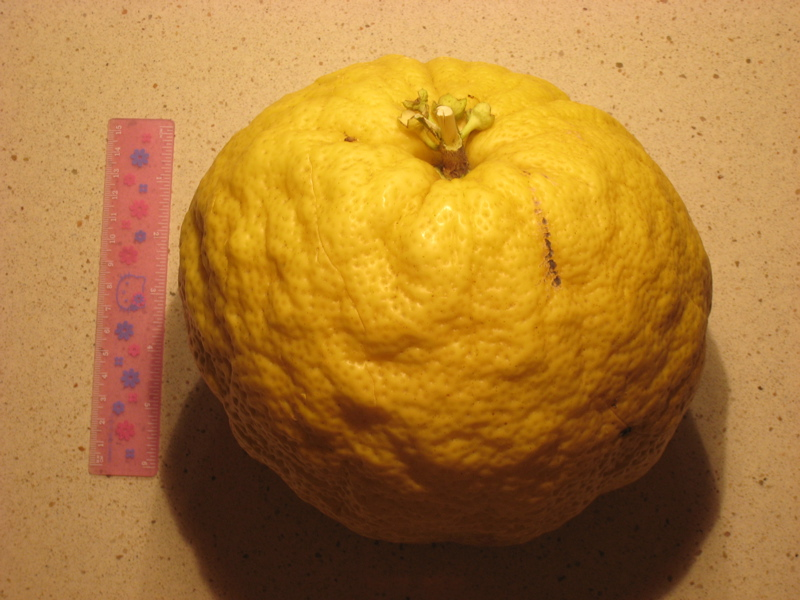

Scientific classification
- Kingdom: Plantae
- Clade: Tracheophytes
- Clade: Angiosperms
- Clade: Eudicots
- Clade: Rosids
- Order: Sapindales
- Family: Rutaceae
- Genus: Citrus
- Species: C. × pyriformis

Binomial name
- Citrus × pyriformis Hassk.

= Ponderosa lemon =

Citrus fruit and plant

The ponderosa lemon (Citrus × pyriformis) (also called Skierniewice lemon) is a citrus hybrid of a pomelo and a citron. It is not the same as the 'Yuma Ponderosa' lemon-pomelo hybrid used as citrus rootstock.

== Description ==
Ponderosa lemon trees are slow growing but reach a height of 12 to 24 feet (3.7 to 7.3 m) at maturity. The leaves are long, evergreen, glossy, and citron-like, being ovate elliptic in shape and lemon scented. They have medium-thick branches with many spines. New growth is purple-tinged, as are the flowers. Ponderosa lemon also has larger than average citrus flowers, and bears fruit throughout the year. When grown as an ornamental, it requires pruning to control the shape, and may be trained as a bush or tree.

Ponderosa lemon is less cold-hardy than a true lemon. It bears medium to large fruit with a thick and bumpy rind. The fruits are seedy, and while they look similar to a citron, they taste like a lemon.

== Origin and History ==
The ponderosa lemon originated in roughly 1887, and is believed to come from a chance seedling grown in Hagerstown, Maryland. It was later named and introduced to the nursery trade in 1900. In Poland, pomologist Szczepan Pieniążek introduced the so-called Skierniewice lemons (pl. cytryna skierniewicka) and popularized their growing in Polish homes, which was meaningful at the time because of the relative scarcity of imported fruits.

Though often referred to as a cross between the lemon and citron, a recent genomic analysis showed it to solely contain pomelo (Citrus maxima) and citron (Citrus medica) DNA, perhaps being an F2 hybrid. Thus they cannot derive from true lemons, which have a mandarin orange component.

== Uses ==
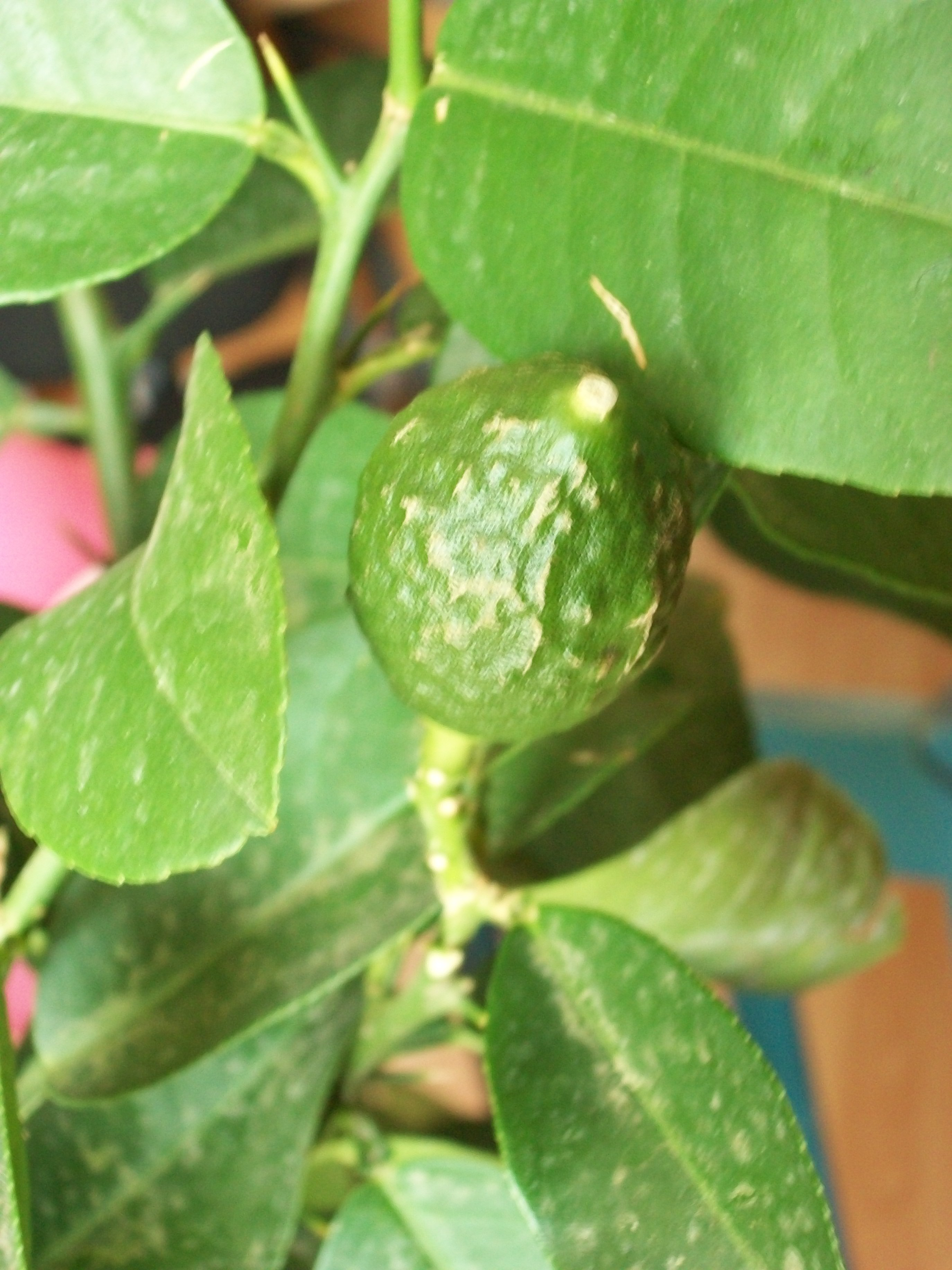
Fruitlet of Ponderosa lemon

Ponderosa lemon is not widely grown commercially, but it is commonly grown as an ornamental plant. In areas where the winter's cold may damage the plant, they are grown in containers. In such cases they are usually grafted to dwarf rootstocks to help maintain a smaller, more manageable size. The impressive sized fruits may be left on the tree for many months after they've ripened without a drop in the fruits' quality. In addition, like citron, Ponderosa lemon trees can flower and bear fruit at the same time, further adding to the visual appeal.

While the fruit are larger than that of a normal lemon, they have the same flavor and acidity. As such, the fruit can be used in place of true lemons. There is enough juice for several lemon pies in just one large Ponderosa lemon, and they can replace lemons measure for measure in recipes.
