= 2027 GB3 Championship =

Motor racing championship

The 2027 GB3 Championship is a motor racing championship for open wheel, formula racing cars scheduled to be held across Europe. The 2027 season will be the eleventh organised by the British Racing Drivers' Club in the United Kingdom, and the seventh season under the GB3 moniker after rebranding from the BRDC British Formula 3 Championship in mid-2021. The championship will feature a mix of professional motor racing teams and privately funded drivers.

2027 is scheduled to see the debut of the GB3 Championship Copa del Sol Series, a twelve-race winter series held in Spain on three consecutive weekends in February.

== Main series ==
=== Teams and drivers ===
All teams will utilize a Tatuus MSV GB3-025 chassis powered by a 2.4-litre Mountune engine and running Pirelli tyres.

Team	No.	Driver	Rounds
(United Kingdom) Aurora Motorsport	TBA	(Brazil) Aurelia Nobels	TBC
(United Kingdom) Aurora Motorsport	TBA	TBA	TBC
(United Kingdom) Aurora Motorsport	TBA	TBA	TBC
(United Kingdom) Pace Performance	TBA	TBA	TBC
(United Kingdom) Pace Performance	TBA	TBA	TBC
(United Kingdom) Pace Performance	TBA	TBA	TBC

==== Team changes ====
Two teams will join GB3 in 2027, GB4 Championship team Pace Performance and new outfit Aurora Motorsport, each planning to field three cars.

==== Driver changes ====
Maxim Rehm departed the series and ended his racing career to focus on his education.

New team Aurora Motorsport signed Aurelia Nobels, who moves over from Hillspeed after coming 18th in her debut season in 2026.

=== Calendar ===
The provisional calendar was announced on 23 September 2026. Only three rounds will be held in the United Kingdom as the championship will drop its second Silverstone visit for its main season debut at the Circuito de Jerez.

Round		Circuit	Date	Supporting	Map of circuit locations
1	R1	(Belgium) Circuit de Spa-Francorchamps, Stavelot	30 April–2 May	International GT Open; Euroformula Open Championship; GT Cup Open Europe	2027 GB3 Championship is located in Europe
1	R2	(Belgium) Circuit de Spa-Francorchamps, Stavelot	30 April–2 May	International GT Open; Euroformula Open Championship; GT Cup Open Europe	2027 GB3 Championship is located in Europe
1	R3	(Belgium) Circuit de Spa-Francorchamps, Stavelot	30 April–2 May	International GT Open; Euroformula Open Championship; GT Cup Open Europe	2027 GB3 Championship is located in Europe
2	R4	(Spain) Circuito de Jerez, Jerez de la Frontera	18–20 June	F4 Spanish Championship; Eurocup-5	2027 GB3 Championship is located in Europe
2	R5	(Spain) Circuito de Jerez, Jerez de la Frontera	18–20 June	F4 Spanish Championship; Eurocup-5	2027 GB3 Championship is located in Europe
2	R6	(Spain) Circuito de Jerez, Jerez de la Frontera	18–20 June	F4 Spanish Championship; Eurocup-5	2027 GB3 Championship is located in Europe
3	R7	(Hungary) Hungaroring, Mogyoród	2–4 July	International GT Open; Euroformula Open Championship; GT Cup Open Europe	2027 GB3 Championship is located in Europe
3	R8	(Hungary) Hungaroring, Mogyoród	2–4 July	International GT Open; Euroformula Open Championship; GT Cup Open Europe	2027 GB3 Championship is located in Europe
3	R9	(Hungary) Hungaroring, Mogyoród	2–4 July	International GT Open; Euroformula Open Championship; GT Cup Open Europe	2027 GB3 Championship is located in Europe
4	R10	(Austria) Red Bull Ring, Spielberg	30 July–1 August	F4 German Championship	2027 GB3 Championship is located in Europe
4	R11	(Austria) Red Bull Ring, Spielberg	30 July–1 August	F4 German Championship	2027 GB3 Championship is located in Europe
4	R12	(Austria) Red Bull Ring, Spielberg	30 July–1 August	F4 German Championship	2027 GB3 Championship is located in Europe
5	R13	(United Kingdom) Silverstone Circuit, Silverstone	7–8 August	British GT Championship; GB4 Championship	2027 GB3 Championship is located in Europe
5	R14	(United Kingdom) Silverstone Circuit, Silverstone	7–8 August	British GT Championship; GB4 Championship	2027 GB3 Championship is located in Europe
5	R15	(United Kingdom) Silverstone Circuit, Silverstone	7–8 August	British GT Championship; GB4 Championship	2027 GB3 Championship is located in Europe
6	R16	(United Kingdom) Brands Hatch, West Kingsdown	11–12 September	British GT Championship; GB4 Championship	2027 GB3 Championship is located in Europe
6	R17	(United Kingdom) Brands Hatch, West Kingsdown	11–12 September	British GT Championship; GB4 Championship	2027 GB3 Championship is located in Europe
6	R18	(United Kingdom) Brands Hatch, West Kingsdown	11–12 September	British GT Championship; GB4 Championship	2027 GB3 Championship is located in Europe
7	R19	(United Kingdom) Donington Park, Leicestershire	16–17 October	British GT Championship; GB4 Championship	2027 GB3 Championship is located in Europe
7	R20	(United Kingdom) Donington Park, Leicestershire	16–17 October	British GT Championship; GB4 Championship	2027 GB3 Championship is located in Europe
7	R21	(United Kingdom) Donington Park, Leicestershire	16–17 October	British GT Championship; GB4 Championship	2027 GB3 Championship is located in Europe
8	R22	(Spain) Circuit de Barcelona-Catalunya, Montmeló	29–31 October	Eurocup-3; F4 Spanish Championship; Eurocup-5	2027 GB3 Championship is located in Europe
8	R23	(Spain) Circuit de Barcelona-Catalunya, Montmeló	29–31 October	Eurocup-3; F4 Spanish Championship; Eurocup-5	2027 GB3 Championship is located in Europe
8	R24	(Spain) Circuit de Barcelona-Catalunya, Montmeló	29–31 October	Eurocup-3; F4 Spanish Championship; Eurocup-5	2027 GB3 Championship is located in Europe

== Winter series ==
The inaugural GB3 Championship Copa del Sol Series was announced in August 2026.

=== Teams and drivers ===
Teams will utilize the same Tatuus MSV GB3-025 chassis powered by a 2.4-litre Mountune engine and running Pirelli tyres used in the main series.

Team	No.	Driver	Rounds
(United Kingdom) Aurora Motorsport	TBA	(Brazil) Aurelia Nobels	TBC

=== Calendar ===
The calendar for the first season of the Copa del Sol was announced together with the reveal of the winter series on 28 August 2026. Each weekend will hold four qualifying sessions and four races.

Round		Circuit	Date	Map of circuit locations
1	R1	(Spain) MotorLand Aragón, Alcañiz	13–14 February	2027 GB3 Championship is located in Spain
1	R2	(Spain) MotorLand Aragón, Alcañiz	13–14 February	2027 GB3 Championship is located in Spain
1	R3	(Spain) MotorLand Aragón, Alcañiz	13–14 February	2027 GB3 Championship is located in Spain
1	R4	(Spain) MotorLand Aragón, Alcañiz	13–14 February	2027 GB3 Championship is located in Spain
2	R5	(Spain) Circuito del Jarama, San Sebastián de los Reyes	20–21 February	2027 GB3 Championship is located in Spain
2	R6	(Spain) Circuito del Jarama, San Sebastián de los Reyes	20–21 February	2027 GB3 Championship is located in Spain
2	R7	(Spain) Circuito del Jarama, San Sebastián de los Reyes	20–21 February	2027 GB3 Championship is located in Spain
2	R8	(Spain) Circuito del Jarama, San Sebastián de los Reyes	20–21 February	2027 GB3 Championship is located in Spain
3	R9	(Spain) Circuito de Jerez, Jerez de la Frontera	27–28 February	2027 GB3 Championship is located in Spain
3	R10	(Spain) Circuito de Jerez, Jerez de la Frontera	27–28 February	2027 GB3 Championship is located in Spain
3	R11	(Spain) Circuito de Jerez, Jerez de la Frontera	27–28 February	2027 GB3 Championship is located in Spain
3	R12	(Spain) Circuito de Jerez, Jerez de la Frontera	27–28 February	2027 GB3 Championship is located in Spain
