= PKP class OKl27 =

PKP OKl27
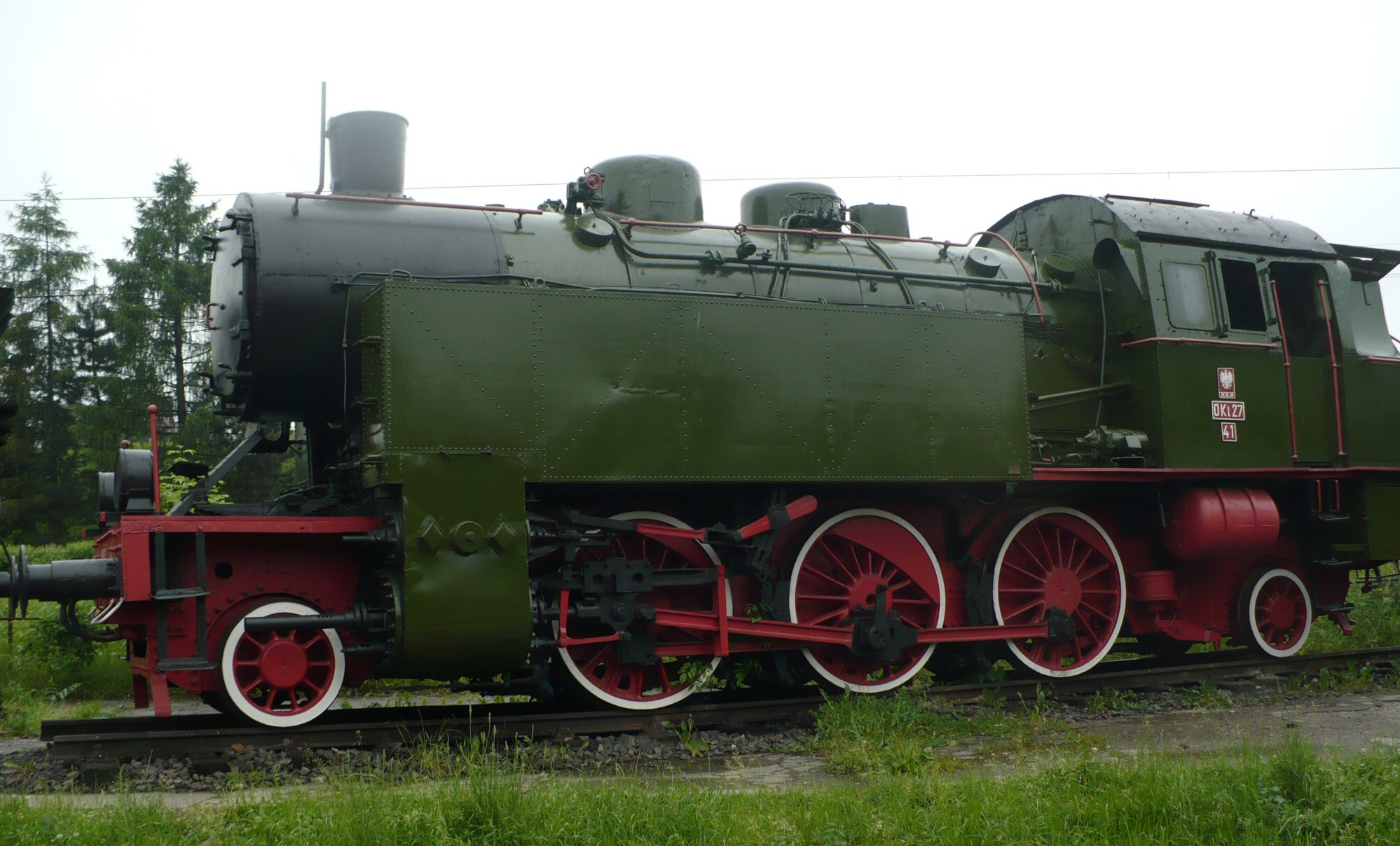
- OKl27-41 in Chabówka
Type and origin
- Power type: Steam
- Builder: Cegielski (Poznań)
- Build date: 1928–1933
- Total produced: 122
Specifications
- Configuration
  - Whyte: 2-6-2T
  - UIC: 1′C1′ h2t
- Gauge: 1,435 mm (4 ft 8 1/2 in) standard gauge
- Leading dia.: 860 mm (33.86 in)
- Driver dia.: 1,500 mm (59.06 in)
- Trailing dia.: 860 mm (33.86 in)
- Length: 12.863 m (42 ft 2 in)
- Adhesive weight: 67.7 t (66.6 long tons; 74.6 short tons)
- Loco weight: 85.1 t (83.8 long tons; 93.8 short tons)
- Fuel type: Coal
- Fuel capacity: 4.0 t (3.9 long tons; 4.4 short tons)
- Water cap.: 10,000 L (2,200 imp gal; 2,640 US gal)
- Firebox
  - Grate area: 2.6 m^{2} (28 sq ft)
- Boiler pressure: 14 kg/cm^{2} (1.37 MPa; 199 psi)
- Heating surface: 122.7 m^{2} (1,321 sq ft)
- Superheater
  - Heating area: 45.2 m^{2} (487 sq ft)
- Cylinders: Two, outside
- Cylinder size: 540 mm × 630 mm (21.26 in × 24.80 in)
Performance figures
- Maximum speed: 80 km/h (50 mph)
- Power output: 930 PS (680 kW)
- Tractive effort: 103 kN (23,000 lbf)
Career
- Operators: PKP » DRB » PKP
- Class: PKP: OKl27; DRB: 75^{12}
- Numbers: PKP: OKl27-1 to OKl27-122; DRB: 75 1201 to 75 1320

PKP class OKl27 is a class of ordinary passenger (O) tank (K) 2-6-2 (l) steam locomotives designed in 1927 for Polskie Koleje Państwowe (Polish State Railways, PKP). It was the first completely Polish construction. The design was prepared by eng. Bryling.

== History ==
=== Production ===
Hipolit Cegielski Metal Works in Poznań produced 122 engines in the period of 1928–1933.

=== Operation ===
The OKl27 class serviced mainly local transport, especially suburban lines.

=== Wartime ===
After the German invasion of Poland in World War II, 107 of the 122 OKl27 locomotives were taken into the Deutsche Reichsbahn fleet as 75 1201 to 75 1307. The remaining 15 were taken into the stock of the Soviet Railways; all but two of which came into German hands and were renumbered 75 1308 to 75 1320.

After the war, most locomotives were restored to Poland and renumbered. While the post-war class remained the same, locomotives were renumbered at random, so a locomotive's pre- and post war identities are (usually) completely different.

=== Preservation ===
Four engines have survived:

- OKl27-10 in Skierniewice (as an exhibit),
- OKl27-26 in Warsaw Railroad Museum (as an exhibit),
- OKl27-27 in Gdynia (as an exhibit), and
- OKl27-41 in Chabówka.

== See also ==
- PKP classification system
