= 2027 Deutsche Tourenwagen Masters =

Car racing championship

The 2027 Deutsche Tourenwagen Masters is the forty-first season of the premier German touring car championship, as well as the twenty-eighth season under the moniker of Deutsche Tourenwagen Masters since the series' resumption in 2000. It is the seventh season of the DTM to be run under Group GT3 regulations, and the fifth under ADAC's promotion.

== Calendar ==
Round	Circuit	Location	Race 1	Race 2	Map of circuit locations	
1	(Austria) Red Bull Ring	Spielberg, Styria	24 April	25 April	2027 Deutsche Tourenwagen Masters is located in Germany 2027 Deutsche Tourenwagen Masters is located in Austria	2027 Deutsche Tourenwagen Masters is located in Netherlands
2	(Germany) Motorsport Arena Oschersleben	Oschersleben, Saxony-Anhalt	8 May	9 May	2027 Deutsche Tourenwagen Masters is located in Germany 2027 Deutsche Tourenwagen Masters is located in Austria	2027 Deutsche Tourenwagen Masters is located in Netherlands
3	(Germany) Lausitzring	Klettwitz, Brandenburg	19 June	20 June	2027 Deutsche Tourenwagen Masters is located in Germany 2027 Deutsche Tourenwagen Masters is located in Austria	2027 Deutsche Tourenwagen Masters is located in Netherlands
4	(Germany) Norisring	Nuremberg, Bavaria	3 July	4 July	2027 Deutsche Tourenwagen Masters is located in Germany 2027 Deutsche Tourenwagen Masters is located in Austria	2027 Deutsche Tourenwagen Masters is located in Netherlands
5	(Netherlands) Circuit Zandvoort	Zandvoort, North Holland	7 August	8 August	2027 Deutsche Tourenwagen Masters is located in Germany 2027 Deutsche Tourenwagen Masters is located in Austria	2027 Deutsche Tourenwagen Masters is located in Netherlands
6	(Germany) Nürburgring	Nürburg, Rhineland-Palatinate	21 August	22 August	2027 Deutsche Tourenwagen Masters is located in Germany 2027 Deutsche Tourenwagen Masters is located in Austria	2027 Deutsche Tourenwagen Masters is located in Netherlands
7	(Germany) Sachsenring	Hohenstein-Ernstthal, Sachsen	25 September	26 September	2027 Deutsche Tourenwagen Masters is located in Germany 2027 Deutsche Tourenwagen Masters is located in Austria	2027 Deutsche Tourenwagen Masters is located in Netherlands
8	(Germany) Hockenheimring	Hockenheim, Baden-Württemberg	9 October	10 October	2027 Deutsche Tourenwagen Masters is located in Germany 2027 Deutsche Tourenwagen Masters is located in Austria	2027 Deutsche Tourenwagen Masters is located in Netherlands
