= Skierniewice =

Polish city in the Łódź Voivodeship

- City county
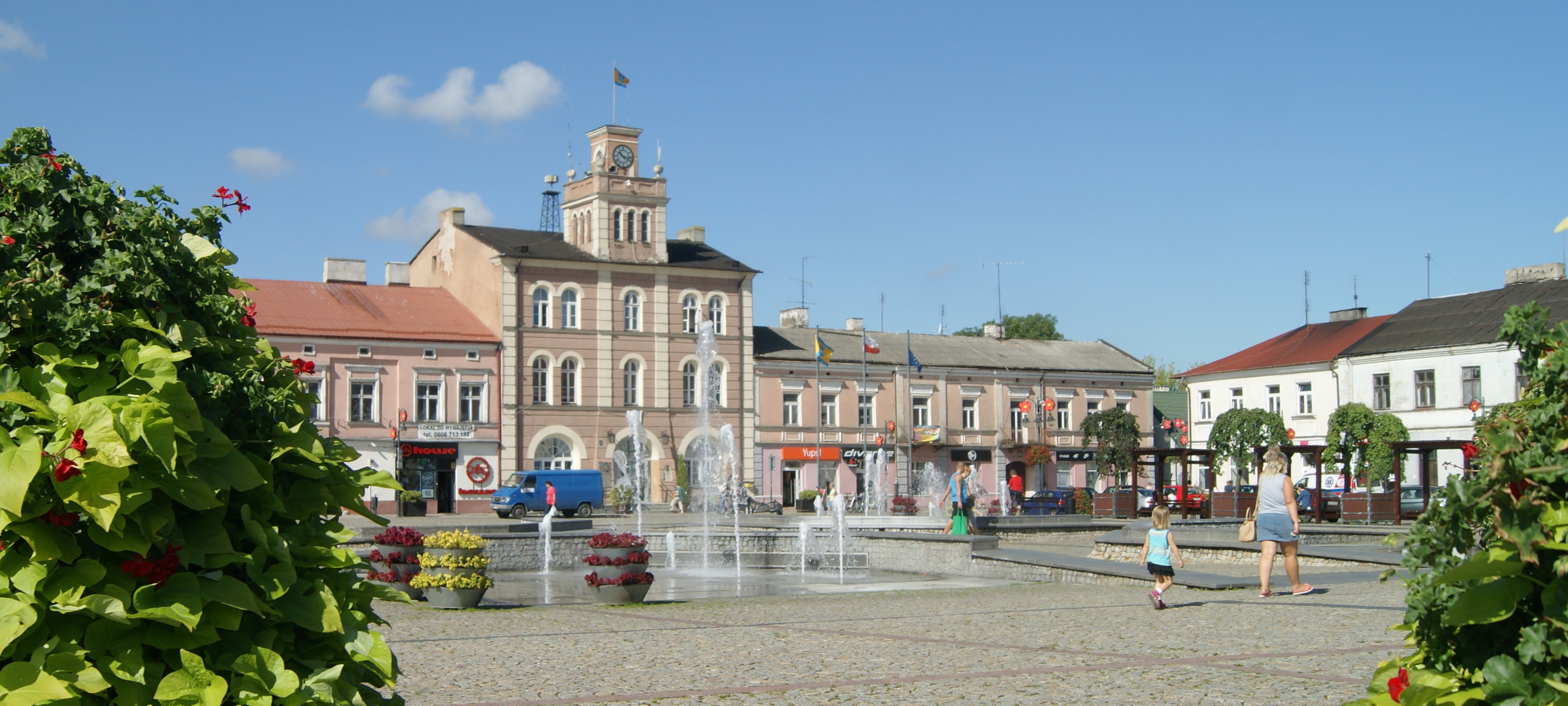
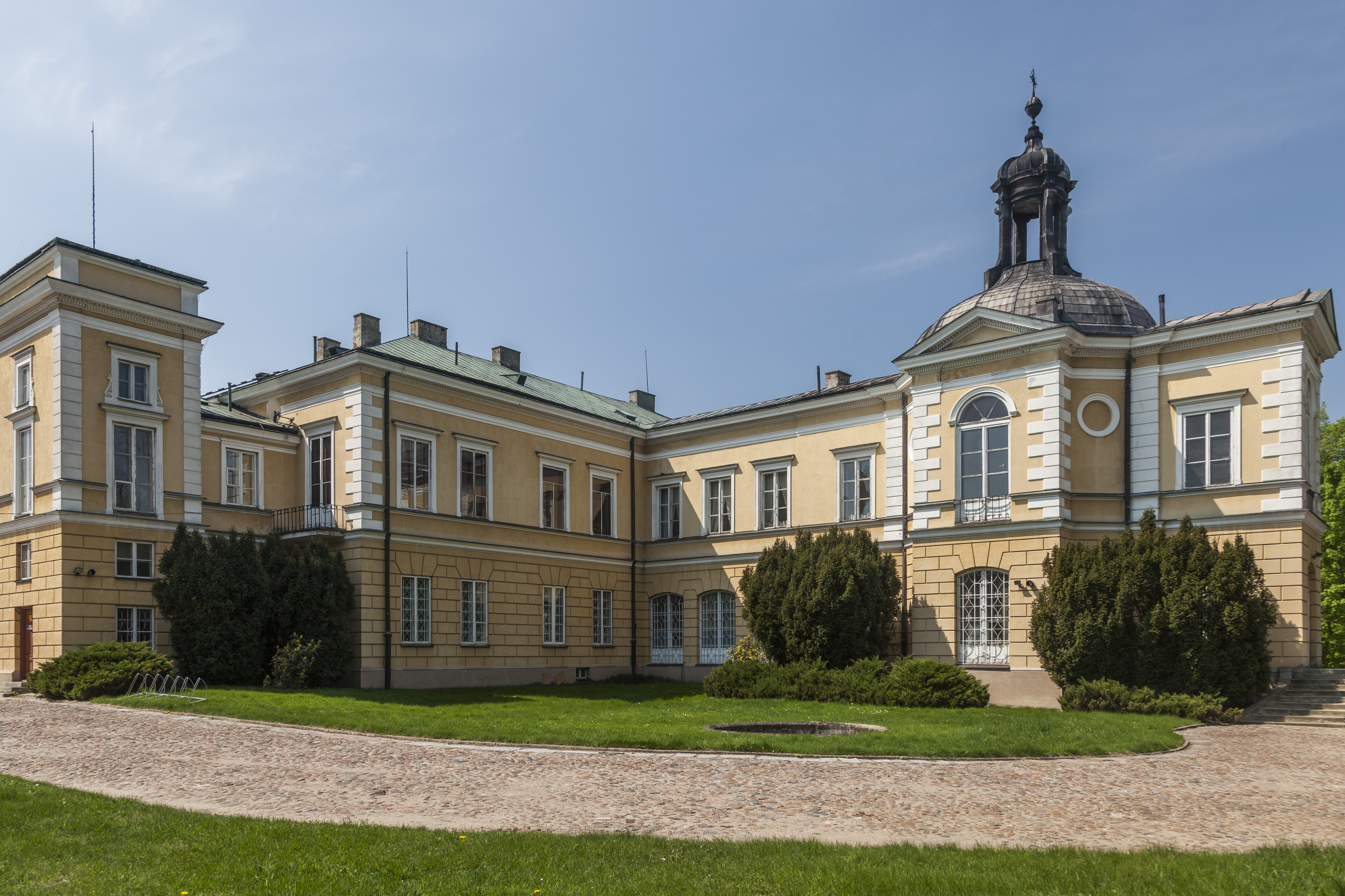
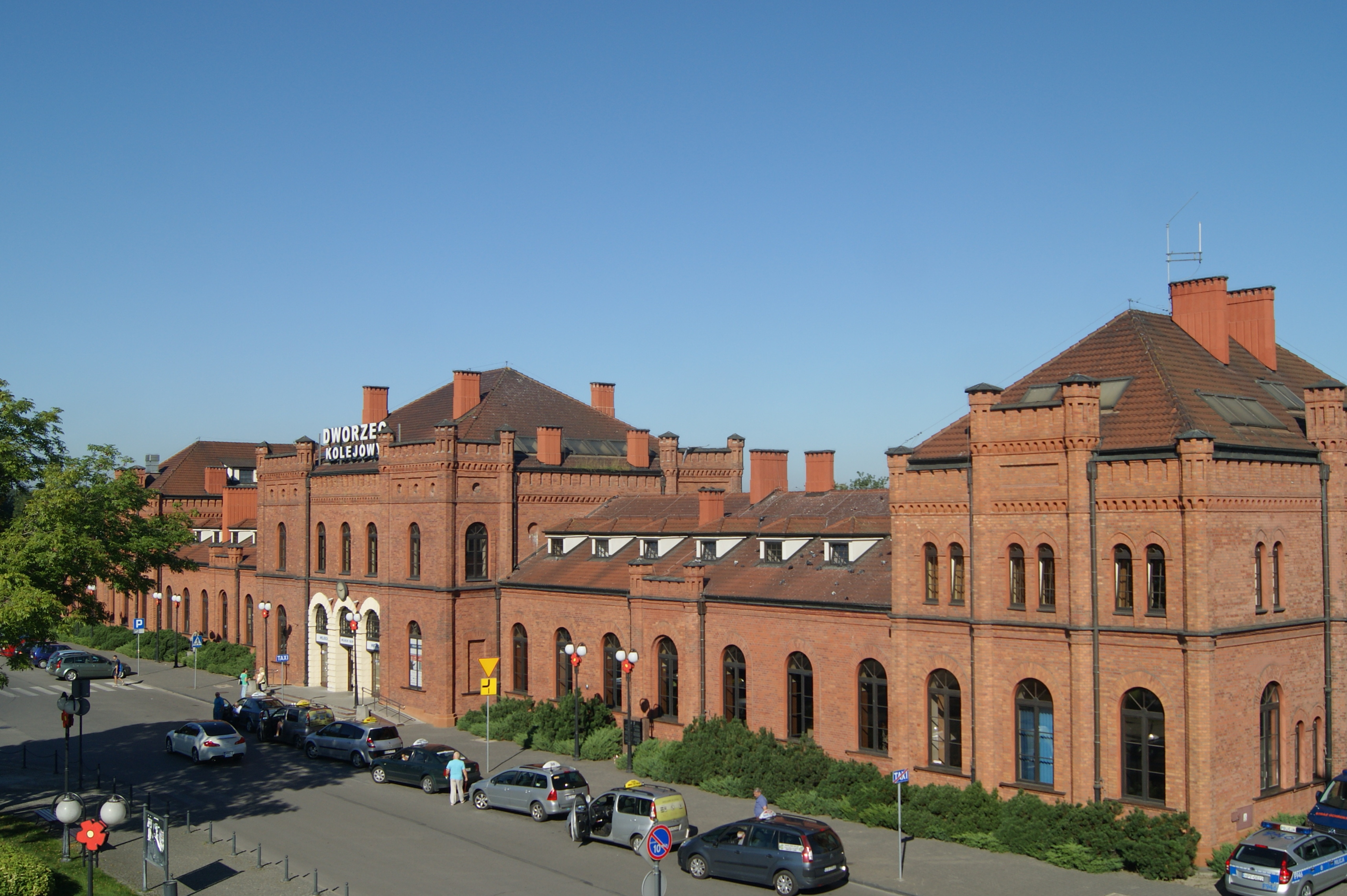
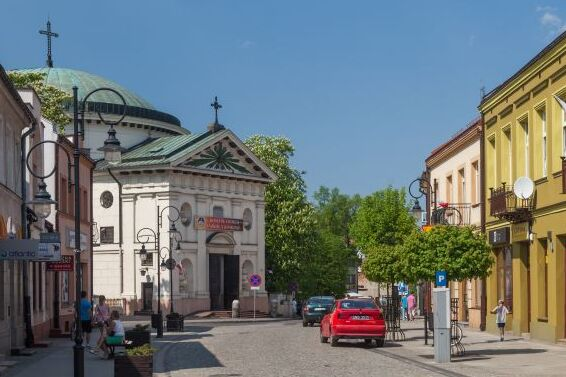
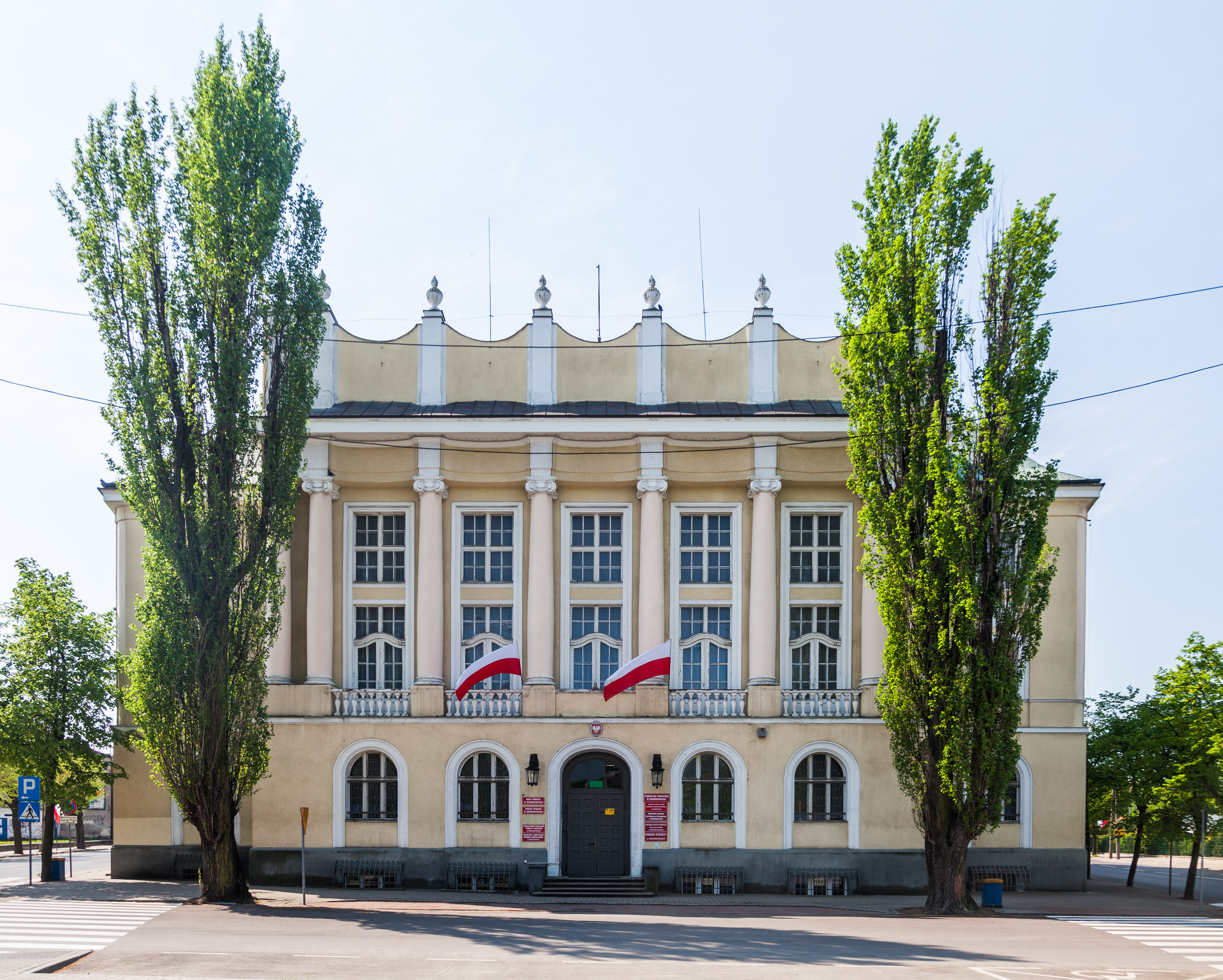
- Rynek (Market Square) Episcopal Palace Railway station St. James church County office

- Flag Coat of arms
- Nickname: Polish Capital of Horticultural Sciences
- Location within Poland
- Coordinates: 51°57′10″N 20°8′30″E
- Country: Poland
- Voivodeship: Łódź
- Powiat: City county
- Gmina: Skierniewice
- Established: before 1217
- City rights: 1457

Government
  - City president: Krzysztof Jażdżyk

Area
  - Total: 34.6 km^{2} (13.4 sq mi)

Population (31 December 2023)
  - Total: 45,184 ▼
- Time zone: UTC+1 (CET)
  - Summer (DST): UTC+2 (CEST)
- Postal code: 96-100
- Area code: +48 46
- Car plates: ES, ESK
- Website: http://www.skierniewice.net.pl

Skierniewice (Polish pronunciation: [skʲɛrɲɛˈvʲit͡sɛ]) is a city in central Poland with 45,184 inhabitants (2023), situated in the Łódź Voivodeship. It is the capital of Skierniewice County. Through the town runs the small river Łupia, also called Skierniewka.

Located in the historic region of Masovia, Skierniewice dates back to the medieval period. It prospered as a local trade center with annual fairs and engaged in domestic and international trade. In the 17th and 18th centuries it hosted the residence of the Primates of Poland, and was home of leading Polish Enlightenment poet Ignacy Krasicki. Skierniewice is known as the "Polish Capital of Horticultural Sciences" with local tradition of horticultural studies dating back to 1922. It hosts the annual Skierniewice Festival of Flowers, Fruits and Vegetables.

It is a railway junction, located on the main railway line almost exactly halfway between the two largest cities of central Poland, Łódź and Warsaw.

== History ==
=== Early history ===
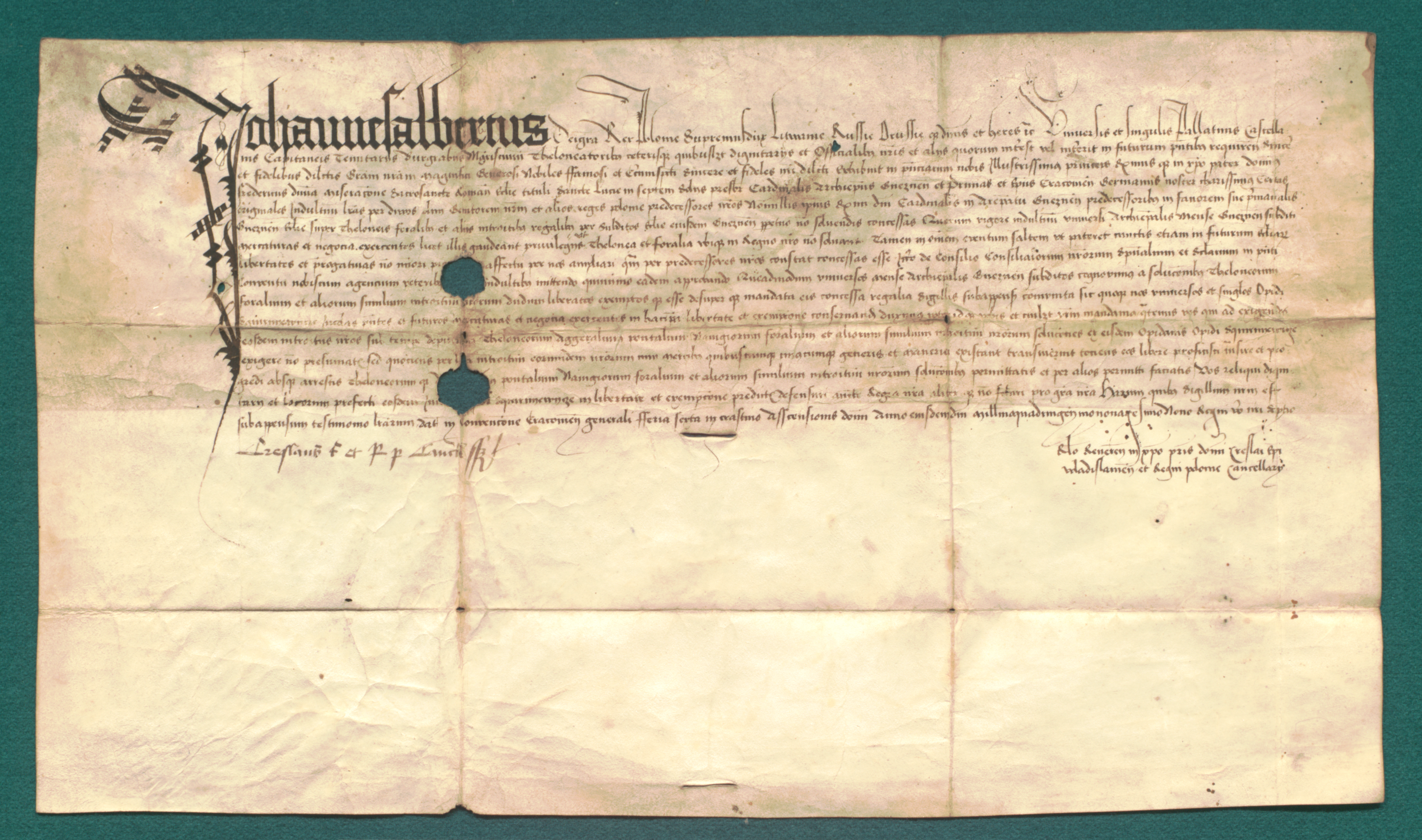
Royal privilege of John I Albert from 1499 for Skierniewice

The oldest known mention of Skierniewice comes from 1359, although it had existed earlier. A palace of the archbishops of Gniezno already existed in the village at that time. Skierniewice gained municipal rights in 1457 and was vested with various privileges in 1456–1458. Administratively it was part of the Rawa Voivodeship of the Greater Poland Province until the Partitions of Poland. Skierniewice was located on a trade route connecting major Polish cities Toruń and Lwów. Local merchants also participated in trade with Gdańsk, Lesser Poland and Podolia, as well as German states. One yearly fair took place since 1457, in 1527 King Sigismund I the Old established a second fair, and in 1641 the Sejm established two more fairs. The town suffered in the 18th-century as a result of the Swedish invasion of Poland and epidemics, and in 1793 it was annexed by Prussia in the Second Partition of Poland.

=== Late modern period ===
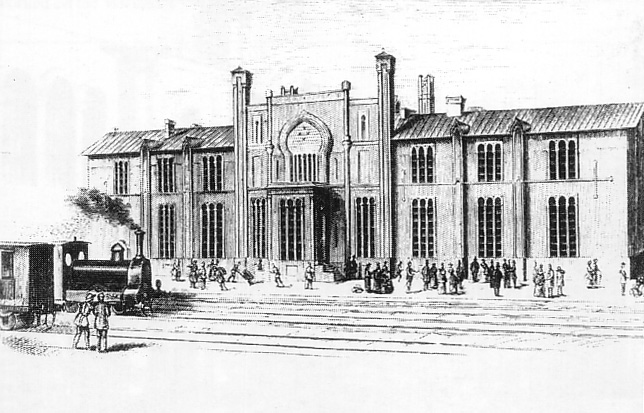
Skierniewice railway station in 1872

Regained by Poles as part of the short-lived Duchy of Warsaw in 1806, in 1815 it became part of so-called Congress Poland and fell to the Russian Partition. In 1845 the Warsaw-Vienna Railway was opened, which passed through Skierniewice. Subjected to anti-Polish and Russification policies, many inhabitants took part in the unsuccessful Polish January Uprising in 1863 and in 1905–1906 Polish protests took place in the town. On September 15, 1884 it was the setting for the meeting of the Three Emperors' League.

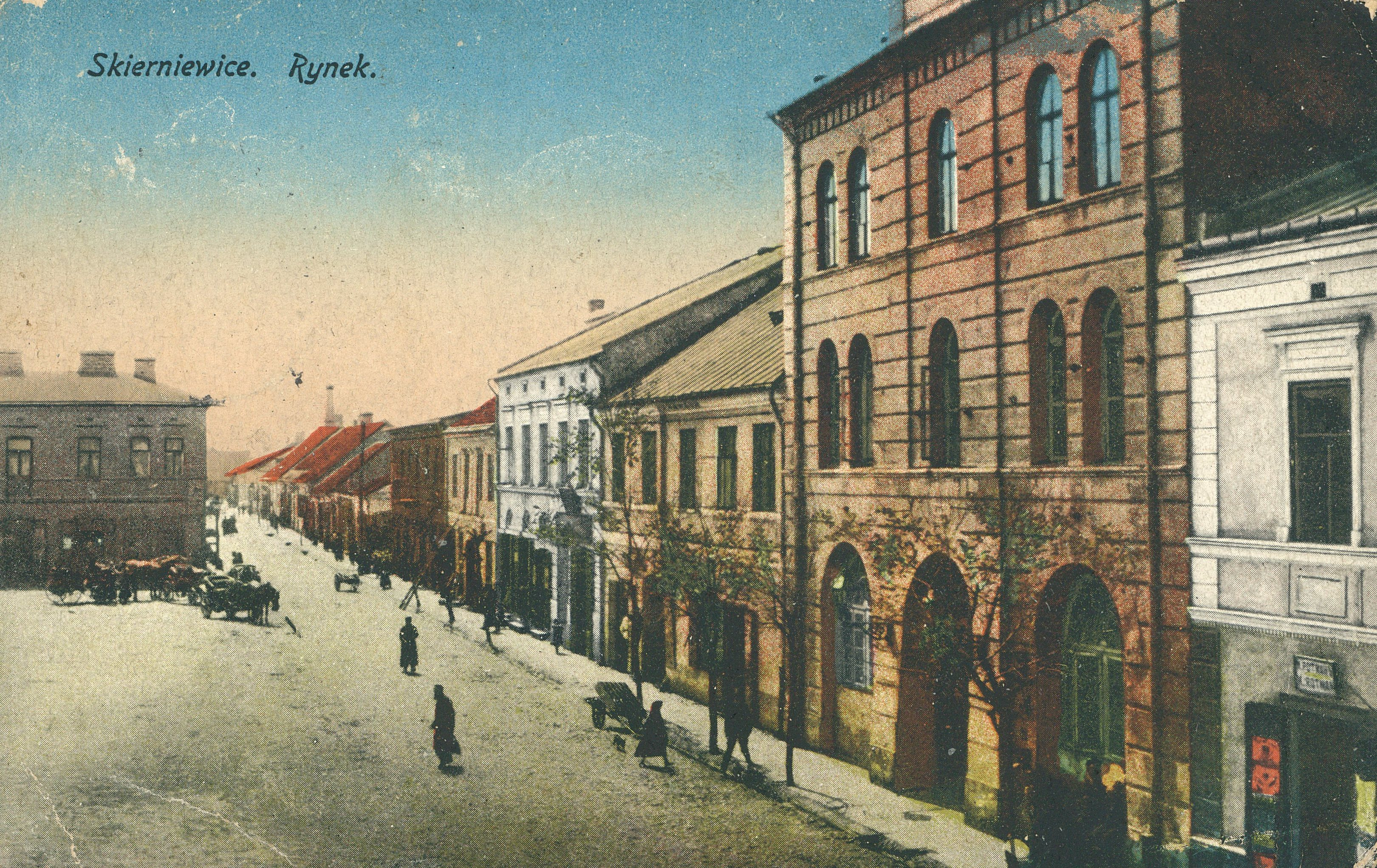
Rynek (Market Square) in 1915

During World War I it was occupied by Germany, and after the war, in 1918, it became part of the re-established Polish state. According to the 1921 census, the town's population was 74.6% Polish and 25.3% Jewish. In 1922, the Department of Vegetable Cultivation of the Warsaw University of Life Sciences was established in Skierniewice, starting the local tradition of horticultural studies. In 1926, the Department of Pomology was founded.

=== World War II ===
During the invasion of Poland, which marked the beginning of World War II, in September 1939, the Germans raided the town, bombing the railway station, as well as houses, the hospital and a church during a church service. Around 150 people were killed, and another 200 were wounded, 100 buildings were destroyed. Captured by the Wehrmacht on September 10, 1939, the next day German troops carried out an execution of 60 Poles in the town (see Nazi crimes against the Polish nation). On September 11–12, Adolf Hitler visited the town.

During the occupation, the Germans established a transit camp for Polish prisoners of war, later deported to Nazi Germany, and a ghetto for 6,900 Jews, later deported to the Warsaw Ghetto and Nazi concentration camps. The Germans executed over 200 people in the town, however, the Polish underground resistance movement still operated there. Resistance activities included sabotage actions, secret Polish education and the assassination of a German V-2 rocket expert. In 1941, expelled Poles from Kwiatkowo and Linne, were deported to Skierniewice.

In May 1944, the Stalag 319 prisoner-of-war camp for Allied POWs of various nationalities was relocated from Chełm to Skierniewice, and then eventually dissolved in August 1944. Afterwards the Dulag 142 transit camp was based in the city, and about 3,000 Poles captured during the Warsaw Uprising passed through it. The head of the Department of Pomology, Professor Włodzimierz Gorjaczkowski, was murdered by the Germans in Warsaw in 1944. After the Warsaw Uprising, many Polish professors from Warsaw found refuge in Skierniewice.

Before evacuation, the Germans looted the library and some of the equipment of the institutions of horticultural sciences. On January 17, 1945, Skierniewice was captured by Soviet forces. On January 18, a general meeting of 13 Warsaw University of Life Sciences professors was held in Skierniewice, at which the situation of the university was discussed and a rector was elected.

=== Post-war period ===
The new Institute of Pomology, Institute of Cultivation, Fertilization and Soil Science and Institute of Olericulture were founded in the city in 1951, 1957 and 1964, respectively, and then merged into the Institute of Horticulture in 2010.

== Sights ==
Among the historic sights of Skierniewice are:

- former Episcopal Palace complex with the Park Miejski ("Municipal Park")
  - Palace Gate, housing the Association for the Tradition of the 26th Skierniewice Infantry Division of the Polish Army (Stowarzyszenie Tradycji 26 Skierniewickiej Dywizji Piechoty)
- churches of Saint James and Saint Stanislaus
- Market Square (Rynek) with the Town Hall (Ratusz)
- Chamber of the History of Skierniewice (Izba Historii Skierniewic) at the former house of Konstancja Gładkowska, teenage love of Frédéric Chopin
- Skierniewice railway station
- Roundhouse Skierniewice
- other historic buildings and structures, including the Kozłowski Villa, now housing the Wedding Palace, and the County Office
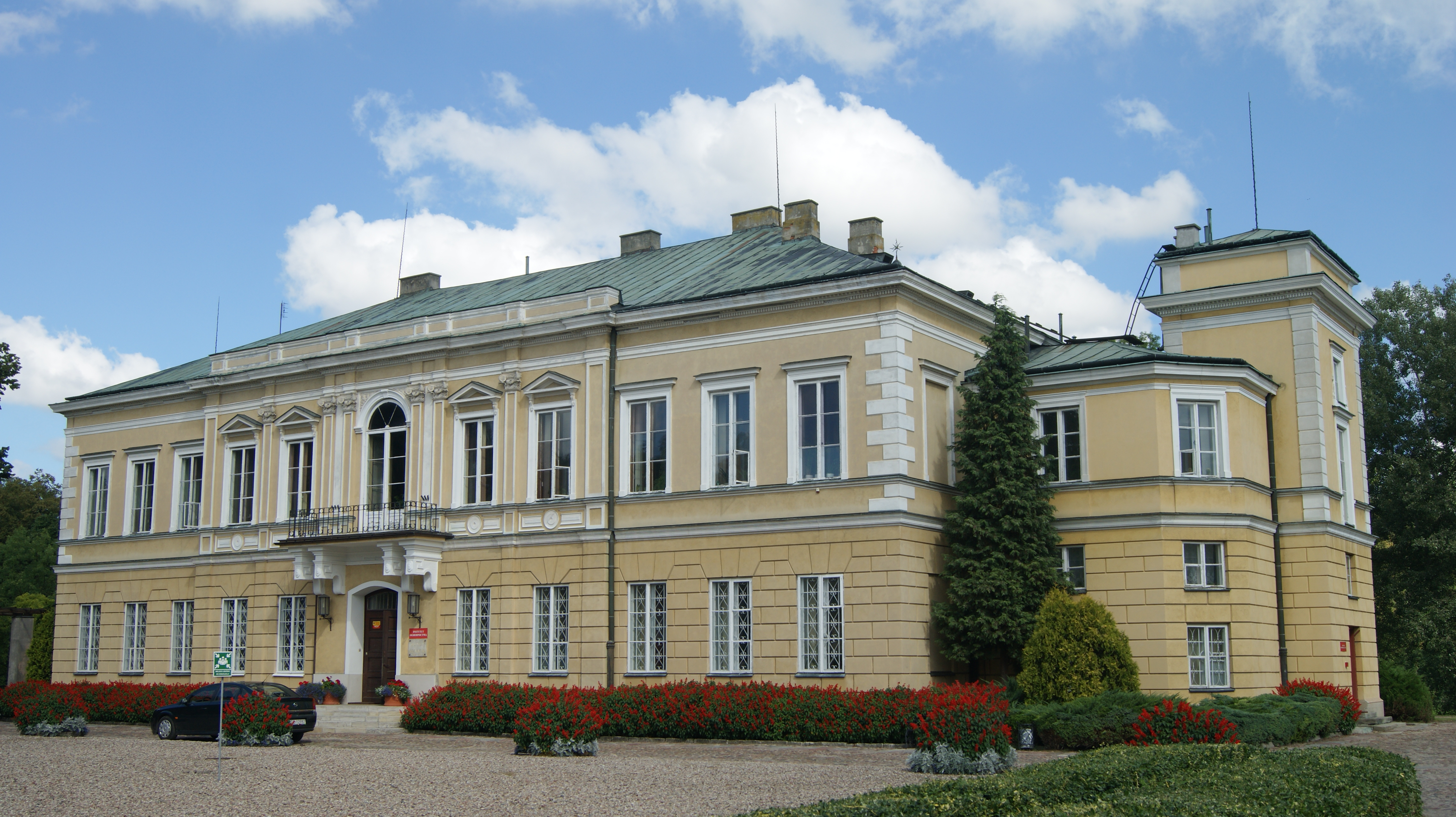
Episcopal Palace

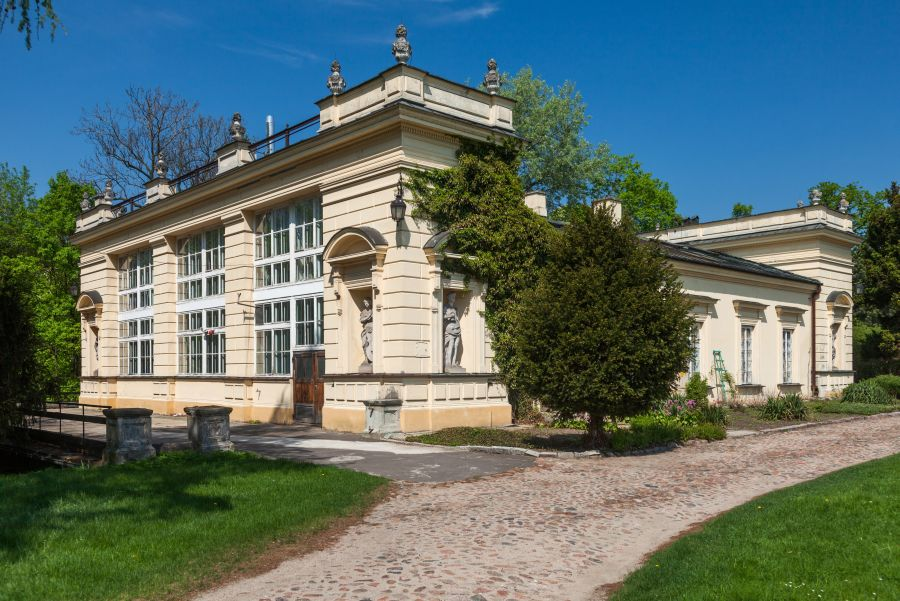
Kitchen building of the Episcopal Palace complex

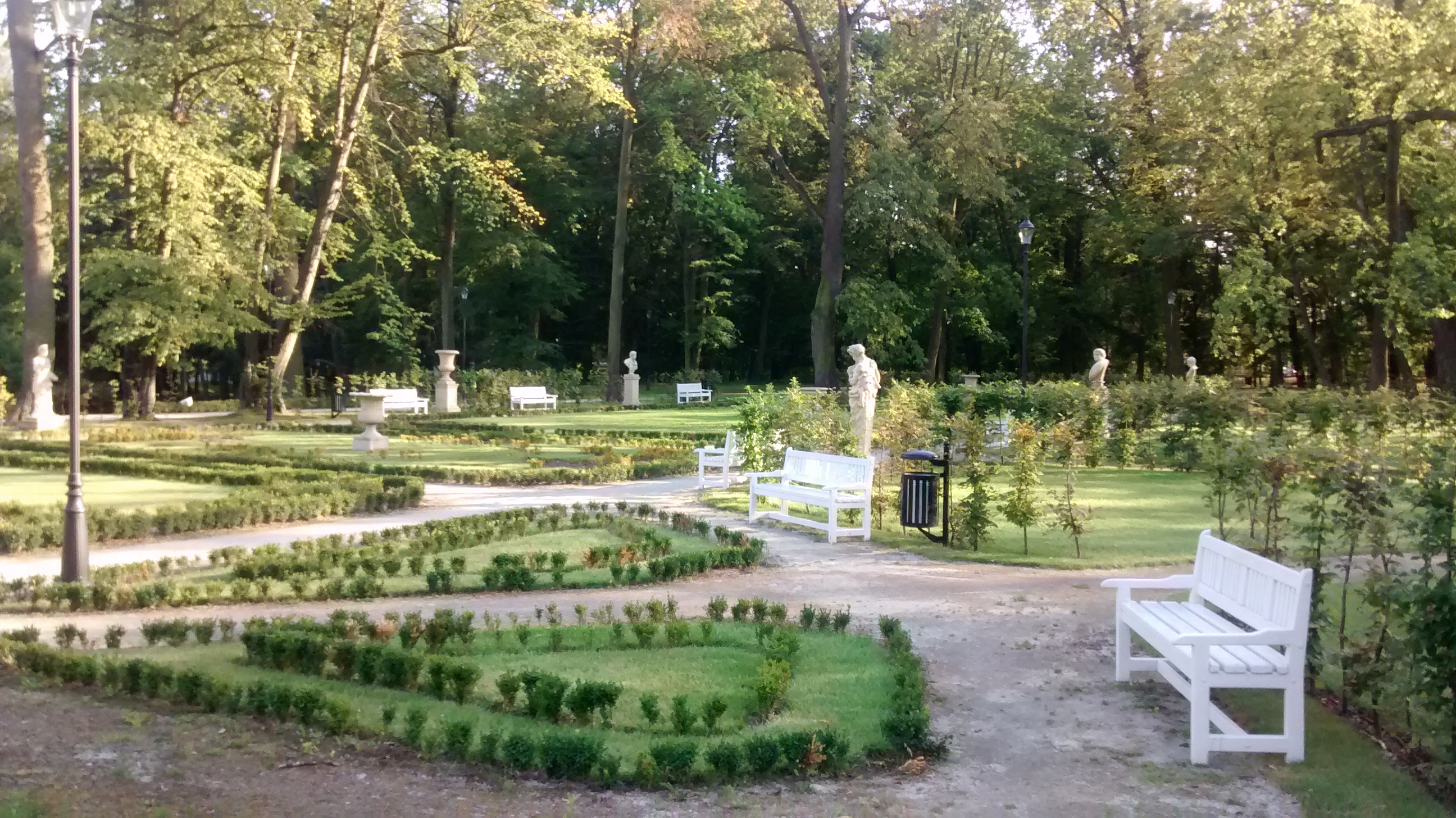
Park Miejski

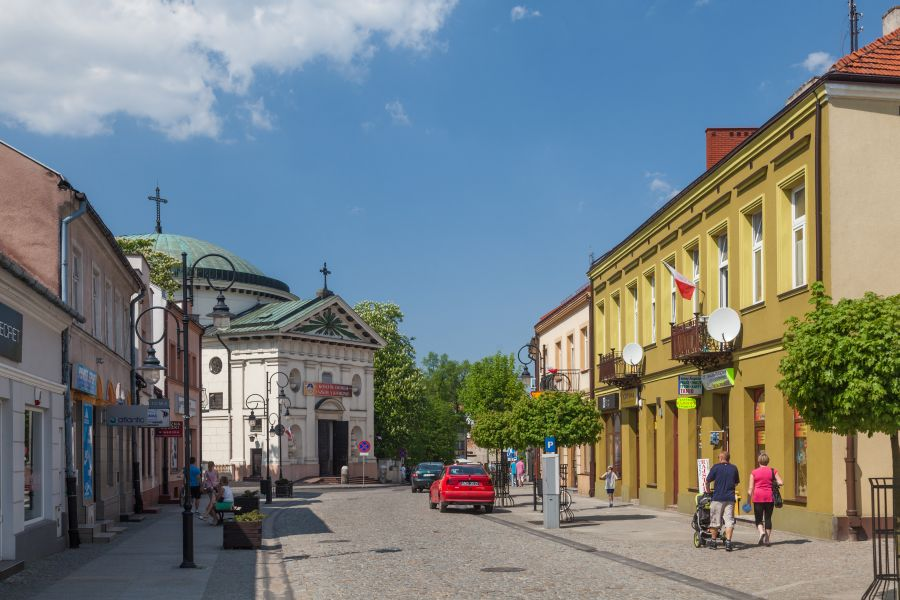
One of the streets of the town centre with historic townhouses and the Saint James church

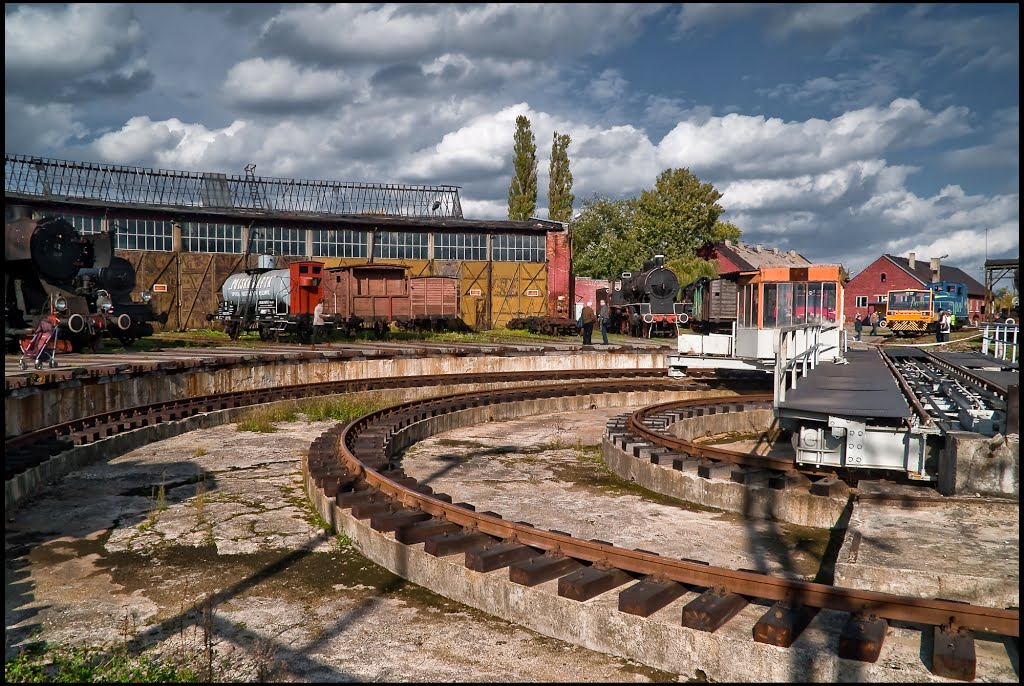
Roundhouse Skierniewice

Skierniewice is also next to Bolimów Landscape Park, a large park that attracts tourists for hiking, camping, and kayaking.

== Education ==
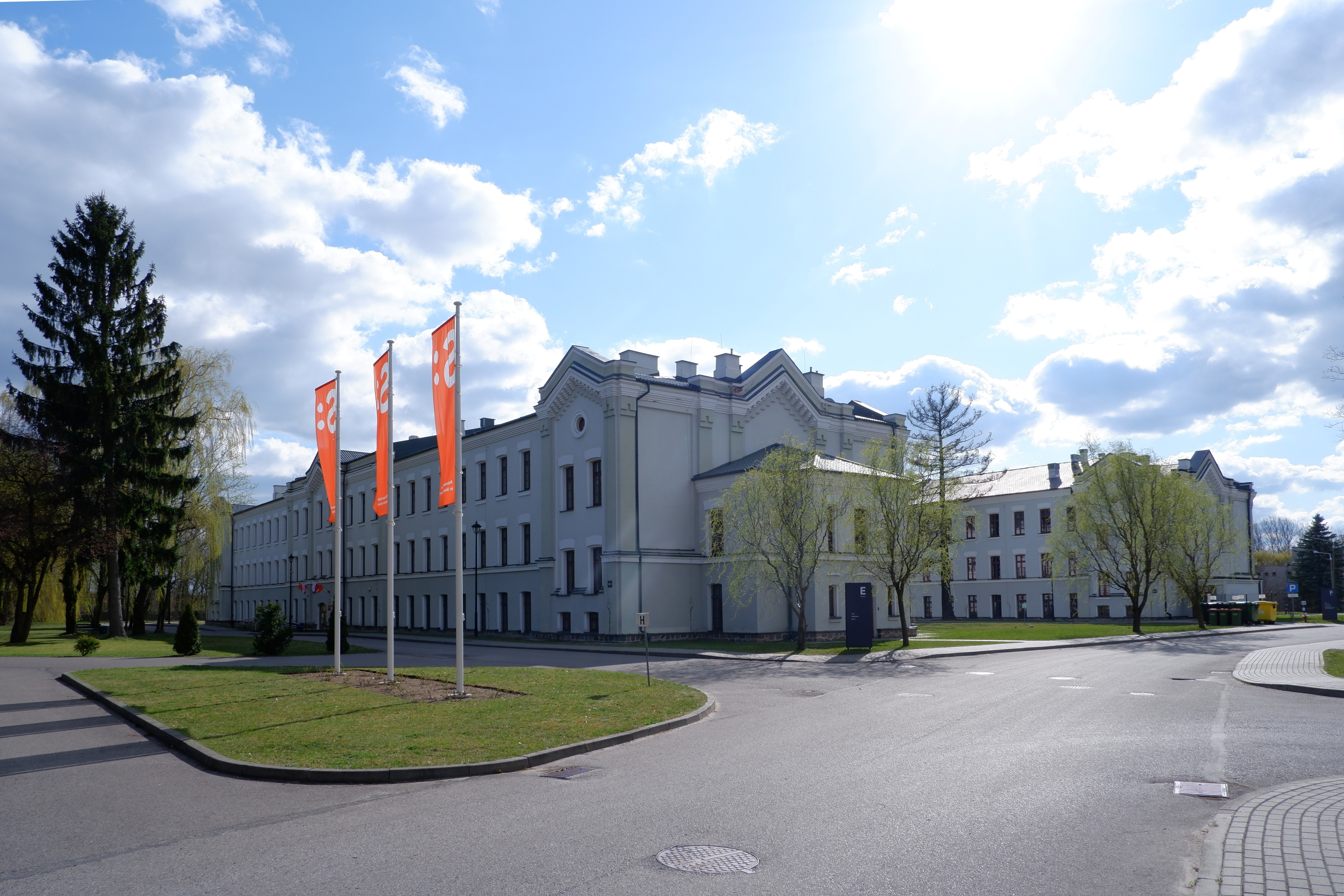
State Higher Vocational School in Skierniewice

- Wyższa Szkoła Ekonomiczno-Humanistyczna
- State Higher Vocational School in Skierniewice

== Sports ==
Unia Skierniewice and Widok Skierniewice football clubs are based in Skierniewice.

== International relations ==
=== Twin towns – Sister cities ===
Skierniewice is twinned with:

Gera, Germany; Châtelaillon-Plage, France; Purgstall an der Erlauf, Austria	Náměšť na Hané, Czech Republic; Levice, Slovakia; Szentes, Hungary

== Notable people ==
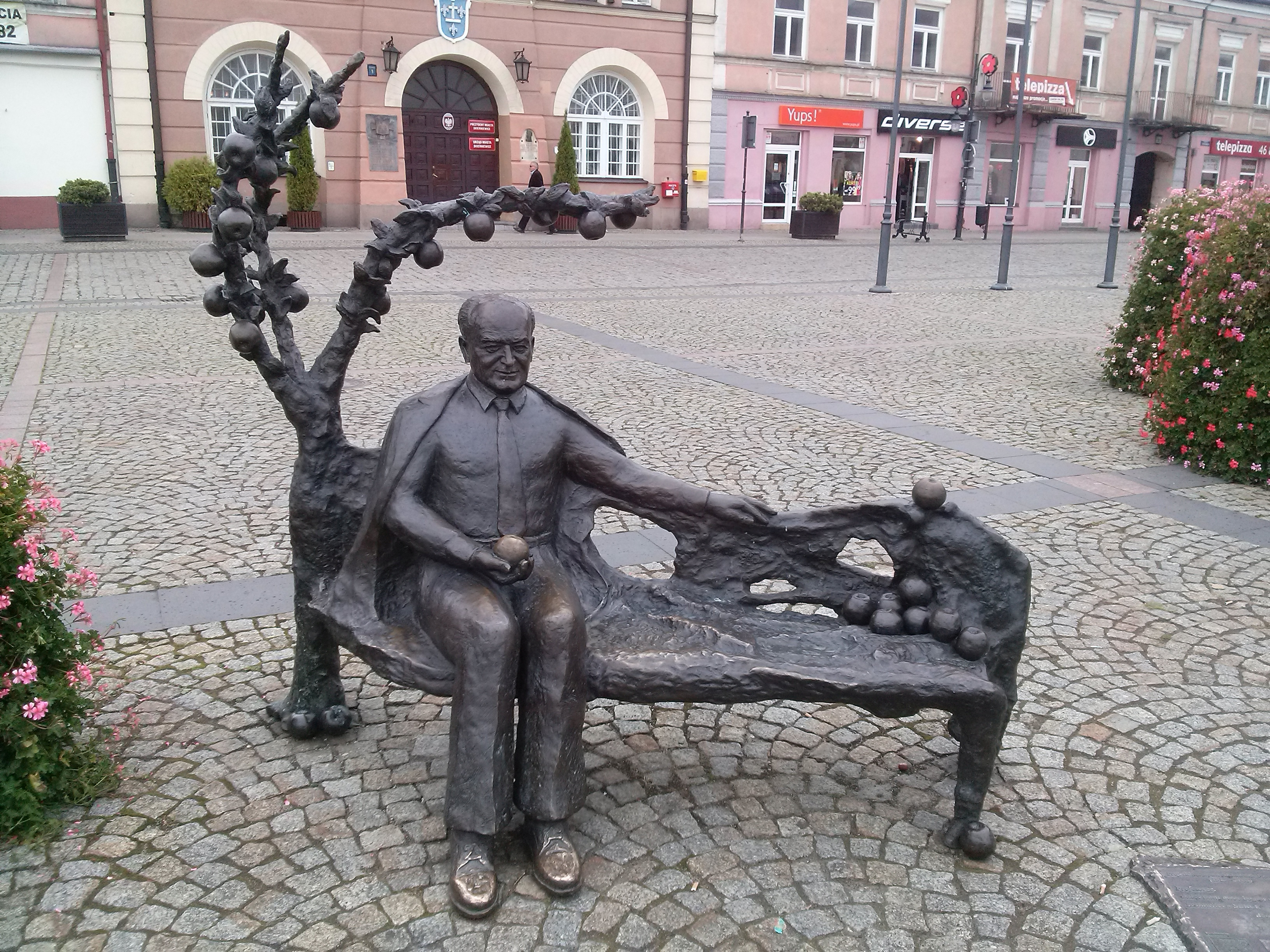
Szczepan Pieniążek monument

Notable people connected with the Skierniewice region:

- Ignacy Krasicki (1735–1801), Roman Catholic archbishop and a writer
- Jan Kozietulski (1781–1821), military commander of the armed forces of the Duchy of Warsaw
- Frédéric Chopin (1810–1849), composer and pianist
- Konstancja Gładkowska (1810–1889), Polish soprano, teenage love of Frédéric Chopin
- Władysław Reymont (1867–1925), novelist, Nobel Prize Winner for Literature
- Edward Okuń (1872–1945), Polish Art Nouveau painter and freemason
- Stanisław Witkowski (1883–1957), officer, engineer and military industry organiser in the Polish Army
- Aleksander Narbut-Łuczyński (1890–1977), Polish lawyer and military officer
- Princess Elisabeth of Hesse and by Rhine (1895–1903), German princess
- Szczepan Pieniążek (1913–2008), pomologist
- Itshak Holtz (1925–2018), Jewish genre artist
- Aleksandra Śląska (1925–1989), film actress
- Lech Mackiewicz (born 1960) film director, actor and playwright
- Tamara Arciuch (born 1975), actress
- Monika Mularczyk (born 1980), football referee
- Grzegorz Gajewski (born 1985), chess grandmaster
- Borys Łyżeń (born 2010), racing driver

== Bibliography ==
- Adamicki, Franciszek (2019). "Rozwój nauk ogrodniczych w Skierniewicach". Zeszyty Naukowe Instytutu Ogrodnictwa (in Polish). 27.
