= 2027 European Le Mans Series =

European racing season

The 2027 European Le Mans Series will be the twenty-fourth season of the Automobile Club de l'Ouest's (ACO) European Le Mans Series. The six-event season will begin at Circuit de Barcelona-Catalunya on 14 March and is scheduled to finish at Algarve International Circuit on 16 October.

The series is open to Le Mans Prototypes, divided into the LMP2 and LMP3 classes, and grand tourer-style racing cars in the LMGT3 class. From this season onwards the LMP2 classes will be rebranded; the current LMP2 class will be renamed LMP2 Pro, with entries that feature an FIA Bronze-rated driver now racing in the LMP2 class.

== Calendar ==
The calendar for the 2027 season was announced on 3 July 2026. The calendar features the same six circuits in the same order as the previous season, with the only notable change being the opening round moving from an April date to March. In September 2026, the 4 Hours of Portimão was moved back two weeks, with the race now taking place on 16 October.

For the second round at Circuit Paul Ricard, the chicane on the Mistral Straight will be removed, allowing drivers to use the full 1.8 km long (1.1 mile) straight for the first time since the 2024 4 Hours of Le Castellet.

Locations of the 2027 races

Rnd	Race	Circuit	Location	Date
	Prologue	Circuit de Barcelona-Catalunya	Montmeló, Spain	8/9 March
1	4 Hours of Barcelona	Circuit de Barcelona-Catalunya	Montmeló, Spain	14 March
2	4 Hours of Le Castellet	Circuit Paul Ricard	Le Castellet, France	2 May
3	4 Hours of Imola	Imola Circuit	Imola, Italy	4 July
4	4 Hours of Spa-Francorchamps	Circuit de Spa-Francorchamps	Stavelot, Belgium	22 August
5	Goodyear 4 Hours of Silverstone	Silverstone Circuit	Silverstone, United Kingdom	5 September
6	4 Hours of Portimão	Algarve International Circuit	Portimão, Portugal	16 October
