= Rudaw, Poland =

Rudaw
- Village
- Location within Poland
- Coordinates: 53°3′N 19°0′E
- Country: Poland
- Voivodeship: Kuyavian-Pomeranian
- County: Golub-Dobrzyń
- Gmina: Ciechocin
- Population (2011): 258

Rudaw [ˈrudaf] is a village in the administrative district of Gmina Ciechocin, within Golub-Dobrzyń County, Kuyavian-Pomeranian Voivodeship, in north-central Poland. The population was 258 in 2011.
