= Achim Medovich =

Aćim Medović (Polish: Joachim Medowic; 15 May 1815 – 11 May 1893) was a physician and writer, the first president of the Serbian Medical Association, secretary of the medical department in the Guardianship of Internal Affairs, a physician of Pozarevac district and professor of forensic medicine at the Velika škola in Belgrade.

== Biography and schooling ==
Aćim Medović was born on 15 May 1815, in Podvizdovo, Eastern Galicia (then the Austrian Empire, today in Poland). His christened name was Joachim Medovich.

He finished high school in Podolina, Poland. In Vienna, he first graduated from the Faculty of Philosophy, and then graduated from the Faculty of Medicine. He was promoted in 1841 to the status of doctor of medicine, surgery and midwifery. After graduating from college, he did not return to his homeland but came to live in the Principality of Serbia.

== Life and work in Požarevac ==
By the decree of Prince Aleksandar Karađorđević, he was appointed physician of the Požarevac District at the end of 1842. The head of the Sanitary Department was Dr. Jovan Stejić. Aćim Medović eagerly accepted the job and began to apply new and effective methods of treatment. He did everything to improve health care in Pozarevac. A few years later, on 20 April 1845, he applied for Serbian citizenship. He did everything to improve health care in Pozarevac. A few years later, on 20 April 1845, he applied for Serbian citizenship. He was granted citizenship on 22 May 1845, when he took the oath. He was included in the list of inhabitants of the Serbian town of Pozarevac on 8 June 1845.

In the 1840s, there was an invasion of the pigeon fly in Serbia. Its bite was deadly and caused the deaths of thousands of cattle. In his annual report from 1843, Jovan Stejić, in his capacity as the head of the Sanitary Department, writes: "This spring, domestic cattle in eastern Serbia suffered the most from the unfortunate pigeon fly." The Gurgosovac, Aleksinac and Crnorec districts alone attacked up to 11,327 cattle, sheep and goats, pigs and horses. " In 1846, the order of the District Administration in Požarevac arrived to examine the distribution of this insect as soon as possible to stop it. Dr. Aćim Medović accepted the job and in the next few months in the field, having no professional literature and without the help of a microscope, he followed the life of a pigeon fly. He informed the Ministry of Internal Affairs about his results, and that was the first study about that deadly insect. In the world of science, the study was of great importance.

Aćim Medović also sent a report on the pigeon fly to the Society of Serbian Letters. His entire work and significant journalistic activity recommended him to become a member of the Society of Serbian Letters on 28 December 1847. Acim Medović's job required frequent trips around the district. In his free time, he researched and wrote. He was interested in medieval fortifications, traces of destroyed monasteries, battlefields, customs, culture, insurgents from Karađorđe's and Milošević's time, as well as the health of the population in the district. On the basis of the collected material, he wrote in 1851 "History of the Požarevac district from the point of view of the state description and history". The book contained a geographical map that he made himself, as well as a historical and geographical overview of the Požarevac district.

== Relocation and work in Belgrade ==
Acim Medović was transferred to Belgrade ten years after his arrival and work in Požarevac due to his successful work. Lindermeier, who was the secretary of the Sanitary Department in the Ministry of the Interior, noticed the work of Aćim Medović and was appointed temporary prince by the prince's decree No. 459 of 24 May 1852 as "temporary head of the medical department in the Guardianship of Internal Affairs".

After moving to Belgrade, he continued his scientific and health business work, and in 1852 the Gazette of the Society of Serbian Letters printed the work of Dr. Aćim Medović "Požearevac District, Historically Described, with a Map", and printed in the Great Belgrade Calendar for 1852 is a discussion of "Flaws and shortcomings of our people and a way to help them". He was a very professional and conscientious doctor. Every other week he wrote work reports, and after three months he wrote a general, broader report. He was appointed permanent secretary of the Sanitary Department of the Ministry of the Interior on 15 May 1853.

His work in the Sanitary Department of the Ministry of the Interior came to the fore when Prince Miloš, on his return from exile in 1858, appointed Stevo Milosavljević, the first doctor of Serbian origin, to replace the dismissed Dr. Lindenmeier. Dr. Milosavljević was a valuable associate of Dr. Medović because during the previous period he gained the necessary experience in the field of sanitary regulations. Dr. Milosavljević and Dr. Medović significantly improved the sanitary regulations of the Principality of Serbia and participated in the drafting of many rules and regulations.

Aćim Medović was elected a regular member of the Serbian Royal Academy on 29 July 1864, in the Department of Natural Sciences and Mathematics.

Recognized as a scientist and physician, he was elected an honorary professor of forensic medicine and hygiene at the Great School in 1865. Aćim Medović showed visible results not only as a professor but also as the writer of our first textbook for that subject. In the first year after his election to that department, he published his lectures in a calligraphic edition titled "Forensic Medicine for Lawyers", and the following year he printed the textbook "Forensic Medicine for Judicial, Police and Sanitary Officials, Lawyers and Other Lawyers". In 1867, he gave lectures in small surgery on first aid, fractures and sprains in a course for barbers and other people, who at that time provided first aid and small medical services independently or as medical assistants. He printed all these lectures in 1869 under the title "Small surgical services and first aid for body injuries". In 1871, he printed a textbook for public and social hygiene, the "Sanitary Police", and in 1872, he published a book for farmers, "Berry Fruit", which was first published in articles in the newspaper Težak. He was elected a full professor in 1879.

== Establishment of the Serbian Medical Association ==
The discoveries in the field of medicine made it necessary for doctors to find ways to regularly follow the innovations in this scientific field. One of the ways was the establishment of medical societies, where they could exchange experiences, prepare or listen to lectures, excerpts from foreign literature...

Serbian doctors realized very early on the importance of funding such a society, as well as founding such a magazine. Since Medović gained a great reputation in our medical circles, he was also interested in social medical work, he advocated the establishment of the Serbian Medical Association. Jovan Valenta and Aćim Medović tried to establish the SLD in 1868, but without success. At the beginning of 1872, Vladan Đorđević worked on the founding of the Serbian Medical Association, and his idea was accepted by several doctors from Belgrade which gave birth to Doctor's Tower. The first meeting of the founding assembly was attended by 15 Belgrade doctors: Aćim Medović, Sava Petrović, Jovan Valenta, Djordje Klinkovski, Bernhard Brill, Josef Holec, Josif Pančić, Jovan Mašin, Petar Ostojić, Panajot Papakostopoulos, Marko Polak, Mladen Janković, Julius Lenk, Ilija Janimir and Vladan Đorđević. The Serbian Medical Association was founded on 22 April 1872, and its professional journal Serbian Archives for All Medicine. Aćim Medović was unanimously elected the first interim president, and at the first regular annual meeting, he was confirmed as the president of the Serbian Medical Association. After the founding of the society, he advocated its improvement, the drafting of the first rules, and the founding of the library of the Serbian Medical Society, to which he donated his 300 books.

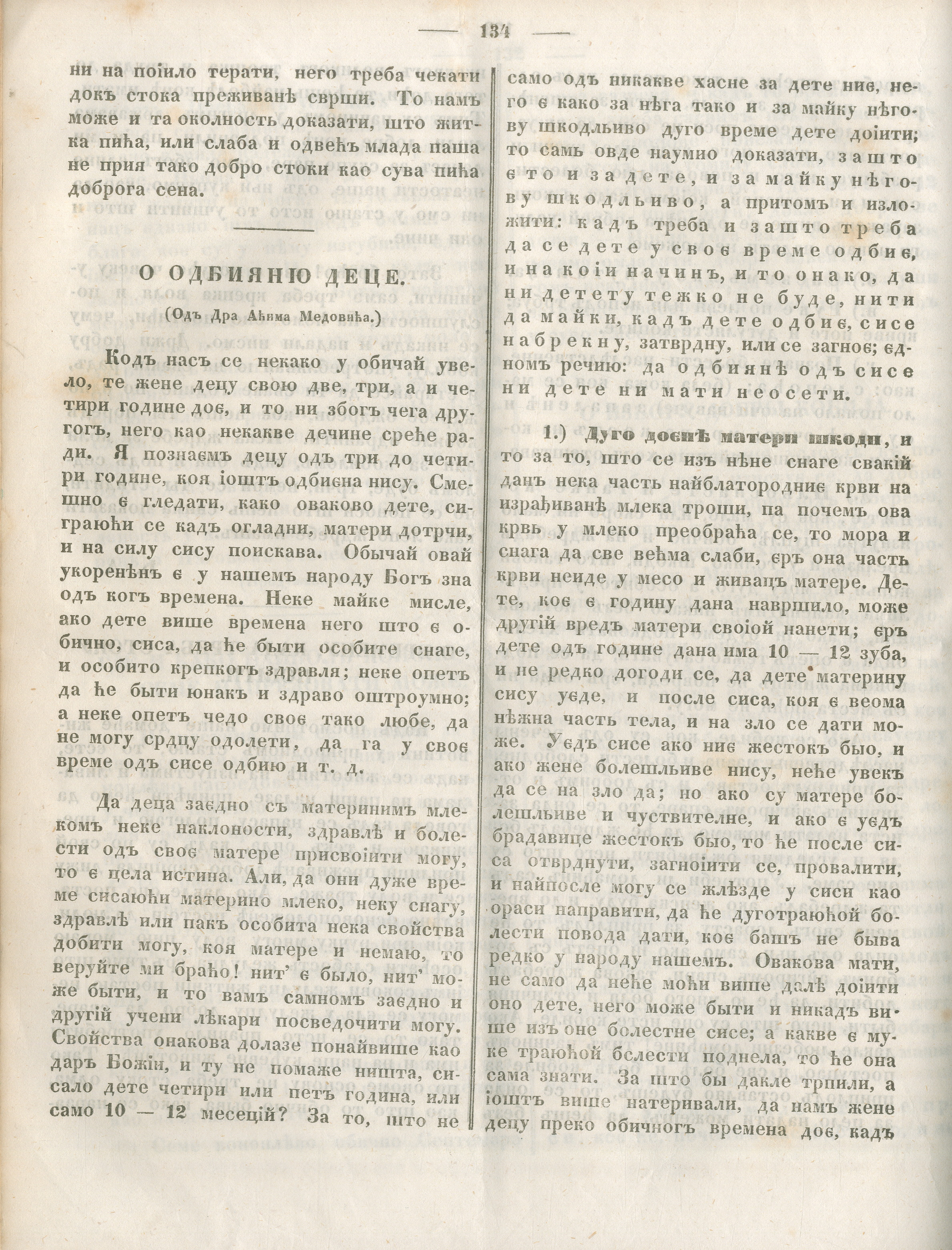
Acim Medovic: "On the rejection of children". – In: Čiča Srećkov list, No. 17, 27 April 1948, page 134

== International congresses ==
Aćim Medović spoke Polish as his mother tongue, Slovak, French, German, Latin, English and fluent Serbian. He was very professional and respected and was sent as a government delegate to professional international congresses abroad: in 1867 to the Veterinary Congress in Zurich, 1870–1871. as a member of the commission for examining the war medical experience in Germany, in 1872 at the Congress of Hungarian Physicians in the small town of Mehadia, in 1873 at the International Congress of Physicians in Vienna, where he went together with Jovan Valenta and Vladan Đorđević.

== Aćim Medović as a military doctor ==
In the Serbian–Turkish wars, Aćim Medović organized reserve hospitals in Belgrade for the care of the wounded and sick. He was the head of the Belgrade Military Hospital. The hospital had 158 beds as well as operating rooms.

== Retirement and death ==
At the suggestion of the Minister of Education and Church Affairs, Aćim Medović, he retired on 1 November 1887. He was elected an honorary member of the Serbian Royal Academy on 15 November 1892.

He died on 13 May 1893 in Belgrade, at the age of 79. He was buried in the Old Belgrade Cemetery.

He was a member of the Society Of Serbian Letters, the Serbian Academic Society, the Serbian Medical Society, an honorary member of the Serbian Royal Academy, a longtime vice president of the Serbian Red Cross Society, an active member of the Serbian Agricultural Society. He translated Moanjije's pamphlet titled "What is the Red Cross". He took part in all the wars and for his many merits, he was awarded many decorations.

== Decorations ==
- Order of the Takovski Cross of the 5th order
- Order of the Takovski Cross IV order
- Order of the Takovski Cross III order

== Bibliography ==
1. Medović A., "About the way in which the people in our country keep sheep from the profession". Belgrade 1845, 10 Nov.. B 268, no. 1368
2. Medović A., "About this year's cholera, its skill and treatment in the Požerevac area". Podunavka, 1848. no. 46; 186–188 and no. 47; 189–191.
3. Medović A., "On the disease Janičari (carbunculus malignus)". Čiča-Srećkov list, 1848
4. Medović A., "On the rejection of children". Čiča-Srećkov list, 1848
5. Medović A., "On the choice of breastfeeding women". Čiča-Srećkov list, 1848
6. Medović A., "Flaws and shortcomings of our people and the way to help the team". Belgrade Great Calendar, 1852; 38–55 and 1853; 179–184.
7. Medović A., "Požerevačko District from the side of the state and history (with the attached map of the Požerevac District)". Glasnik Drustva srpske slovesnosti, 1852. sv. 4; 185–218
8. Medović A., "On caring for children in the first years of life". Rodonjub, 1858
9. Medović A., "Forensic Medicine for Lawyers and Doctors Part I" (according to Bergman). Belgrade 1865
10. Medović A., "Forensic Medicine for court, police and medical officials, lawyers and other lawyers". Belgrade 1866
11. Medović A., "Small surgical services and first aid in body injuries, for trained barbers in the Principality of Serbia". Belgrade 1869
12. Medović A., "Sanitary police according to the principles of the rule of law (according to Širmajer) with a few remarks and indications of the existing in the Principality of Serbia sanitary-police laws, regulations and continuation of the main regulations and lessons for police and medical officials". Belgrade 1871
13. Medović A., "Berries". Heavy 1872. No. 20; 157–159 and no. 22; 173–177.
14. Medović A., "On mineral waters in Serbia". Report by Wilhelm Sigismund. Serbian Archives of Complete Medicine: Journal of the Serbian Medical Association 1879; book III; 117–129

== Sources ==
- Čolović, Radoje, ed. (2015). Др Аћим Медовић : (1815–1893) : живот и дело : поводом 200 година од рођења : зборник радова с научног скупа одржаног 22. априла 2015. године, Београд. [Dr Aćim Medović: (1815–1893): life and work: on the occasion of his 200th birthday: collection of papers from the scientific conference held on April 22, 2015] (in Serbian). Belgrade: Serbian Academy of Sciences and Arts, Srpsko lekarsko društvo. (printed at "Макарије")
- Stanojević, V. (1956). "Dr Aćim Medović 1815-1893". Journal of the Serbian Medical Society. 9. Serbian Archives of Medicine: 1084.
