= Frydrychowo =

Frydrychowo may refer to the following places:

- Frydrychowo, Golub-Dobrzyń County in Kuyavian-Pomeranian Voivodeship (north-central Poland)
- Frydrychowo, Wąbrzeźno County in Kuyavian-Pomeranian Voivodeship (north-central Poland)
- Frydrychowo, Sępólno County in Kuyavian-Pomeranian Voivodeship (north-central Poland)
- Frydrychowo, Pomeranian Voivodeship (north Poland)
