= Świętosław, Golub-Dobrzyń County =

Świętosław
- Village
- Location within Poland
- Coordinates: 53°0′N 18°59′E
- Country: Poland
- Voivodeship: Kuyavian-Pomeranian
- County: Golub-Dobrzyń
- Gmina: Ciechocin

Świętosław (Polish pronunciation: [ɕfjɛnˈtɔswaf]) is a village in the administrative district of Gmina Ciechocin, within Golub-Dobrzyń County, Kuyavian-Pomeranian Voivodeship, in north-central Poland.
