= Adamki, Kuyavian-Pomeranian Voivodeship =

Adamki
- Village
- Location within Poland
- Coordinates: 53°0′26″N 19°7′21″E
- Country: Poland
- Voivodeship: Kuyavian-Pomeranian
- County: Golub-Dobrzyń
- Gmina: Zbójno

Adamki [aˈdamki] is a village in the administrative district of Gmina Zbójno, within Golub-Dobrzyń County, Kuyavian-Pomeranian Voivodeship, in north-central Poland.
