= Wielka Łąka =

- Village
- Location within Poland
- Coordinates: 53°7′N 18°50′E
- Country: Poland
- Voivodeship: Kuyavian-Pomeranian
- County: Golub-Dobrzyń
- Gmina: Kowalewo Pomorskie

Wielka Łąka [ˈvjɛlka ˈwɔŋka] is a village in the administrative district of Gmina Kowalewo Pomorskie, within Golub-Dobrzyń County, Kuyavian-Pomeranian Voivodeship, in north-central Poland. The named, main road connected to the village is called DK15.
