= Łukaszewo =

Łukaszewo may refer to the following places:

- Łukaszewo, Greater Poland Voivodeship (west-central Poland)
- Łukaszewo, Golub-Dobrzyń County in Kuyavian-Pomeranian Voivodeship (north-central Poland)
- Łukaszewo, Inowrocław County in Kuyavian-Pomeranian Voivodeship (north-central Poland)
