= Kazimierzowo =

Kazimierzowo, Poland
- Village
- Location within Poland
- Coordinates: 53°0′28″N 19°12′25″E
- Country: Poland
- Voivodeship: Kuyavian-Pomeranian
- County: Golub-Dobrzyń
- Gmina: Zbójno

Kazimierzowo [kaʑimjɛˈʐɔvɔ] is a village in the administrative district of Gmina Zbójno, within Golub-Dobrzyń County, Kuyavian-Pomeranian Voivodeship, in north-central Poland.
