= Morgowo =

- Village
- Location within Poland
- Coordinates: 53°0′N 18°56′E
- Country: Poland
- Voivodeship: Kuyavian-Pomeranian
- County: Golub-Dobrzyń
- Gmina: Ciechocin

Morgowo [mɔrˈɡɔvɔ] is a village in the administrative district of Gmina Ciechocin, within Golub-Dobrzyń County, Kuyavian-Pomeranian Voivodeship, in north-central Poland.
