= Dominik Dziewanowski =

Polish general

- Dominik Dziewanowski
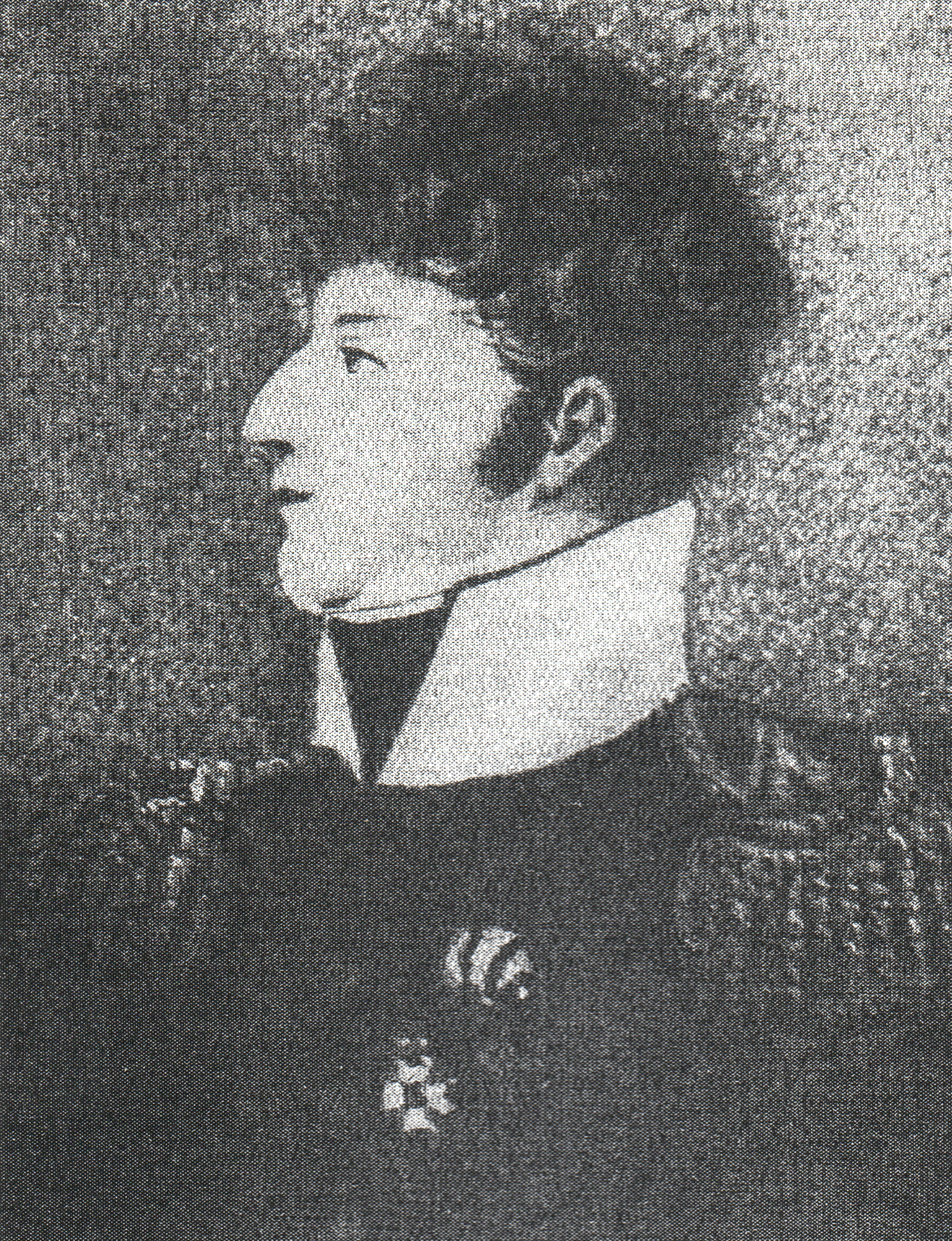
- Born: 1759; Płonne, Poland
- Died: 1827 (aged 67–68); Płonne, Congress Poland
- Relatives: Mikołaj Chopin
- Military career
- Allegiance: Duchy of Warsaw
- Branch: Army of the Duchy of Warsaw
- Rank: Brigadier general
- Unit: 6th Lancers Regiment
- Commands: 28th Light Cavalry Brigade
- Conflicts: Kościuszko Uprising; War of the Fourth Coalition; Polish–Austrian War; French invasion of Russia
- Awards: Virtuti Militari; Legion of Honour
- Other work: Military translator and memoirist

Dominik Dziewanowski (Płonne, 1759–1827, Płonne) was a Polish military officer, a general in the Army of the Duchy of Warsaw.

== Life ==
=== Family ===
Dominik Dziewanowski was a Polish nobleman who came from a Mazowsze szlachta family of the Jastrzębiec coat of arms. His father was the Castellan of Chełmno, Juliusz Dziewanowski, and his mother was Ludwika, née Pawłowska.

=== Friendship with Fredrick Chopin ===
Dominik Dziewanowski's family was closely befriended with Fryderyk Chopin's since the years that Fryderyk's father, Mikołaj Chopin, worked as a tutor to the Dziewanowski family's children. Dominik Dziewanowski's father became godfather to Ludwika Chopin, Fryderyk's sister. His nephew Dominik (1811-1881) become one of young Fryderyk Chopin's closest childhood friends, in a Warsaw boarding school and in the summer vacations of 1825 and 1826, which Fryderyk spent on the Dziewanowski estate, Szafarnia. It was around Dominik Dziewanowski's family estate that Chopin's music was influenced by folk music of the countryside.

=== Military career ===
Dominik Dziewanowski served in the Prussian Army, then in the Polish Army, where he was adjutant to Prince Stanisław Poniatowski. In the 1794 Kościuszko Uprising, he fought at Rypin and Łabiszyn. After the suppression of the Kościuszko Uprising, he settled on his country estate but nevertheless maintained contact with the Polish Legions and supported them financially.

In 1806, he formed the 6th Lancers Regiment and joined the Army of the Duchy of Warsaw. At the head of his regiment he fought in Napoleonic campaigns: in 1807, in Pomerania, at Tczew and Gdańsk, and in 1809 at Sandomierz. During the second campaign, he also took Lublin and took part in the capture of Zamość. In 1810, he was promoted brigadier general and appointed military commandant of the Łomża Department. He did not assume the Łomża Department post, as he went on sick leave, which he spent in Teplitz and Karlsbad. In 1810–12, he was military commandant of the Lublin Department; and in 1812, of the Radom Department.

In Napoleon's 1812 Russian Campaign, he commanded the 28th Light Cavalry Brigade of the 4th Cavalry Division (4th Cavalry Reserve Corps) and fought at Mir and Romanov. During the defense of Barysaw in Belarus he was seriously wounded and was taken prisoner by the Russians. In 1814, he settled back in his rural estate, where he spent the rest of his life.

Military historian Janusz Staszewski writes of Dziewanowski:

He was one of the most capable and enlightened military men of his period. Bold in battle, he combined with courage and a quick grasp of situation—which brought him fame as an accomplished raider—a notable ability to constructively influence subordinates. He strove to train younger officers and give them the benefit of his experiences.... He was also fearless in expressing his views. In the event of a setback, he did not blame someone else or circumstances, or seek excuses; he took the blame upon himself.

==== Distinctions ====
- Virtuti Militari, 1808
- Legion of Honour, 1809

== Writings ==
Dziewanowski translated a number of French military writings into Polish, wrote an interesting memoir, and left a manuscript work on the Polish cavalry.
