= Piórkowo, Kuyavian-Pomeranian Voivodeship =

Piórkowo
- Village
- Location within Poland
- Coordinates: 53°03′42″N 19°11′37″E
- Country: Poland
- Voivodeship: Kuyavian-Pomeranian
- County: Golub-Dobrzyń
- Gmina: Radomin

Piórkowo [pjurˈkɔvɔ] is a village in the administrative district of Gmina Radomin, within Golub-Dobrzyń County, Kuyavian-Pomeranian Voivodeship, in north-central Poland.
