= Łubki =

Łubki may refer to the following:

- Łubki, Kuyavian-Pomeranian Voivodeship (north-central Poland)
- Łubki, Lublin Voivodeship (east Poland)
- Łubki, Silesian Voivodeship (south Poland)
- Lubki, the plural of lubok, a form of Russian popular printing
