= Wielgie, Golub-Dobrzyń County =

Wielgie
- Village
- Location within Poland
- Coordinates: 53°2′N 19°7′E
- Country: Poland
- Voivodeship: Kuyavian-Pomeranian
- County: Golub-Dobrzyń
- Gmina: Zbójno
- Population: 478

Wielgie [ˈvjɛlɡʲɛ] is a village in the administrative district of Gmina Zbójno, within Golub-Dobrzyń County, Kuyavian-Pomeranian Voivodeship, in north-central Poland.
