= Piotrkowo, Kuyavian-Pomeranian Voivodeship =

Piotrkowo
- Village
- Location within Poland
- Coordinates: 53°1′N 19°0′E
- Country: Poland
- Voivodeship: Kuyavian-Pomeranian
- County: Golub-Dobrzyń
- Gmina: Ciechocin

Piotrkowo [pjɔtrˈkɔvɔ] is a village in the administrative district of Gmina Ciechocin, within Golub-Dobrzyń County, Kuyavian-Pomeranian Voivodeship, in north-central Poland.
