= Otruda =

- Village
- Location within Poland
- Coordinates: 53°10′39″N 18°55′37″E
- Country: Poland
- Voivodeship: Kuyavian-Pomeranian
- County: Golub-Dobrzyń
- Gmina: Kowalewo Pomorskie
- Population: 70

Otruda [ɔˈtruda] is a village in the administrative district of Gmina Kowalewo Pomorskie, within Golub-Dobrzyń County, Kuyavian-Pomeranian Voivodeship, in north-central Poland.
