= Kiełpiny =

Kiełpiny may refer to the following places:

- Kiełpiny, Golub-Dobrzyń County in Kuyavian-Pomeranian Voivodeship (north-central Poland)
- Kiełpiny, Toruń County in Kuyavian-Pomeranian Voivodeship (north-central Poland)
- Kiełpiny, Rypin County in Kuyavian-Pomeranian Voivodeship (north-central Poland)
- Kiełpiny, Greater Poland Voivodeship (west-central Poland)
- Kiełpiny, Warmian-Masurian Voivodeship (north Poland)
