= Małszyce, Kuyavian-Pomeranian Voivodeship =

Małszyce
- Village
- Location within Poland
- Coordinates: 53°3′N 18°55′E
- Country: Poland
- Voivodeship: Kuyavian-Pomeranian
- County: Golub-Dobrzyń
- Gmina: Ciechocin

Małszyce [mau̯ˈʂɨt͡sɛ] is a village in the administrative district of Gmina Ciechocin, within Golub-Dobrzyń County, Kuyavian-Pomeranian Voivodeship, in north-central Poland.
