= Dulsk, Golub-Dobrzyń County =

Dulsk
- Village
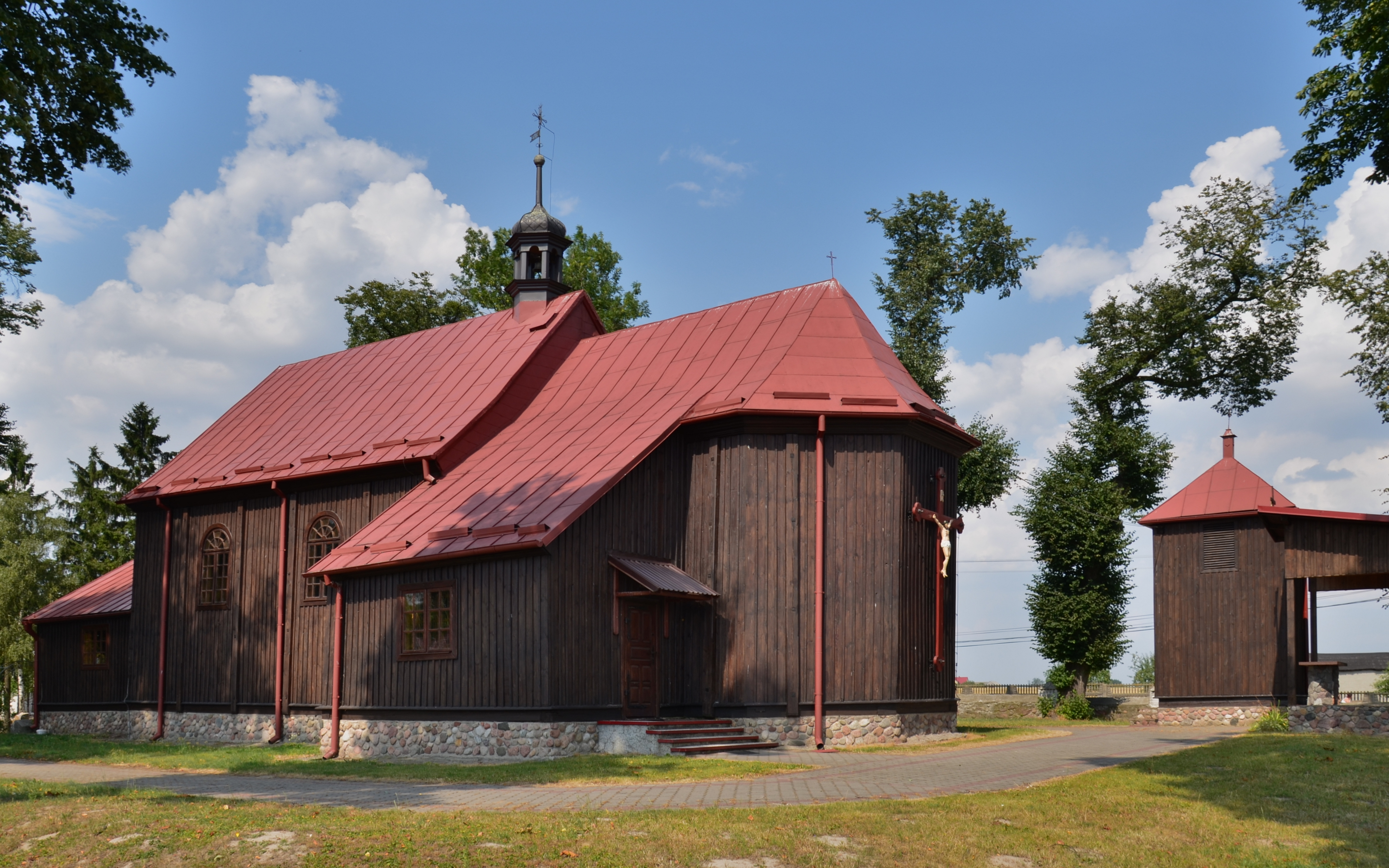
- Church of the Nativity of the Virgin Mary

- Location within Poland
- Coordinates: 53°3′48″N 19°6′39″E
- Country: Poland
- Voivodeship: Kuyavian-Pomeranian
- County: Golub-Dobrzyń
- Gmina: Radomin

Population
  - Total: 650

Dulsk [dulsk] is a village in the administrative district of Gmina Radomin, within Golub-Dobrzyń County, Kuyavian-Pomeranian Voivodeship, in north-central Poland.
