= Kamionka, Golub-Dobrzyń County =

Kamionka
- Village
- Location within Poland
- Coordinates: 53°5′N 19°8′E
- Country: Poland
- Voivodeship: Kuyavian-Pomeranian
- County: Golub-Dobrzyń
- Gmina: Radomin
- Population (approx.): 120

Kamionka [kaˈmjɔnka] is a village in the administrative district of Gmina Radomin, within Golub-Dobrzyń County, Kuyavian-Pomeranian Voivodeship, in north-central Poland.

The village has an approximate population of 120.
