= Spiczyny =

- Village
- Location within Poland
- Coordinates: 53°2′32″N 19°6′47″E
- Country: Poland
- Voivodeship: Kuyavian-Pomeranian
- County: Golub-Dobrzyń
- Gmina: Radomin

Spiczyny [spiˈt͡ʂɨnɨ] is a village in the administrative district of Gmina Radomin, within Golub-Dobrzyń County, Kuyavian-Pomeranian Voivodeship, in north-central Poland.
