= Borek, Golub-Dobrzyń County =

Borek
- Village
- Location within Poland
- Coordinates: 53°8′55″N 18°56′33″E
- Country: Poland
- Voivodeship: Kuyavian-Pomeranian
- County: Golub-Dobrzyń
- Gmina: Kowalewo Pomorskie
- Population: 90

Borek [ˈbɔrɛk] is a village in the administrative district of Gmina Kowalewo Pomorskie, within Golub-Dobrzyń County, Kuyavian-Pomeranian Voivodeship, in north-central Poland.
