= Zbójenko =

- Village
- Location within Poland
- Coordinates: 53°00′49″N 19°08′22″E
- Country: Poland
- Voivodeship: Kuyavian-Pomeranian
- County: Golub-Dobrzyń
- Gmina: Zbójno

Zbójenko [zbuˈjɛŋkɔ] is a village in the administrative district of Gmina Zbójno, within Golub-Dobrzyń County, Kuyavian-Pomeranian Voivodeship, in north-central Poland.
