= Działyń, Kuyavian-Pomeranian Voivodeship =

Działyń
- Village
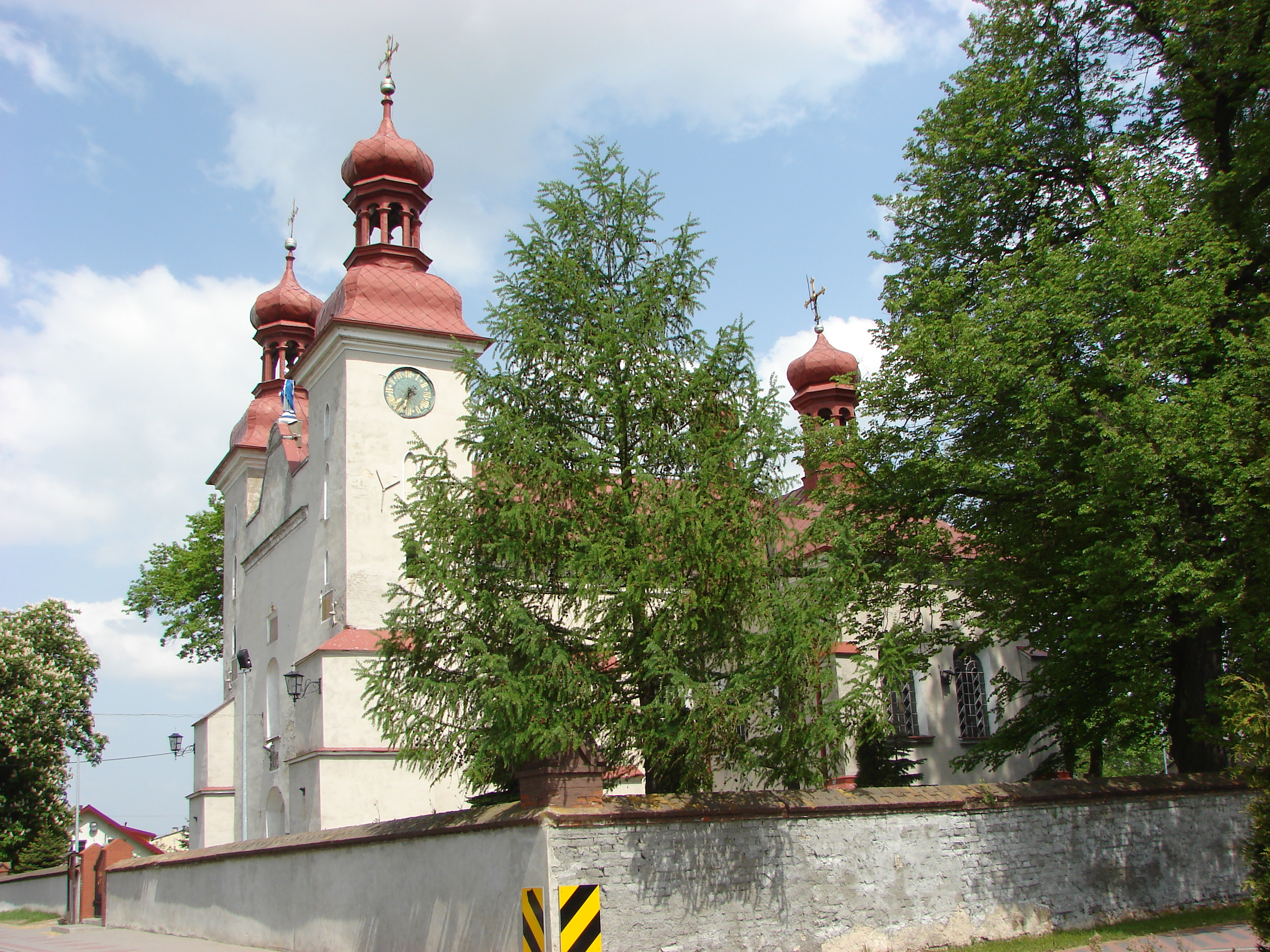
- The Holy Trinity church from 1609

- Location within Poland
- Coordinates: 53°1′N 19°3′E
- Country: Poland
- Voivodeship: Kuyavian-Pomeranian
- County: Golub-Dobrzyń
- Gmina: Zbójno
- Population: 860

Działyń [ˈd͡ʑawɨɲ] is a village in the administrative district of Gmina Zbójno, within Golub-Dobrzyń County, Kuyavian-Pomeranian Voivodeship, in north-central Poland.
