= Srebrniki =

- Village
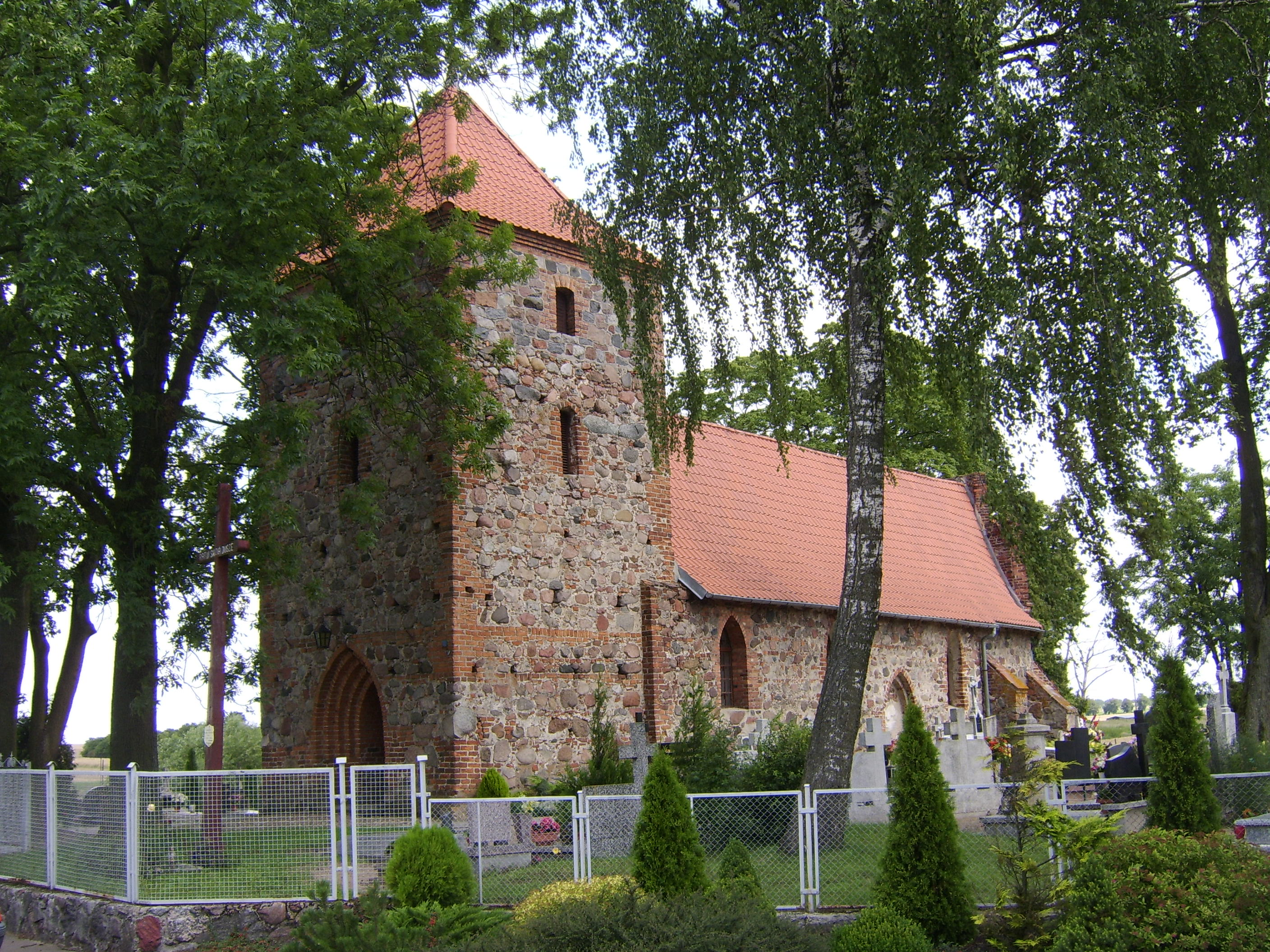
- Church of Our Lady of Snow

- Location within Poland
- Coordinates: 53°11′0″N 18°51′0″E
- Country: Poland
- Voivodeship: Kuyavian-Pomeranian
- County: Golub-Dobrzyń
- Gmina: Kowalewo Pomorskie

Population
  - Total: 270

Srebrniki [srɛbrˈniki] is a village in the administrative district of Gmina Kowalewo Pomorskie, within Golub-Dobrzyń County, Kuyavian-Pomeranian Voivodeship, in north-central Poland.
