= Gaj, Golub-Dobrzyń County =

Gaj
- Village
- Location within Poland
- Coordinates: 53°04′21″N 19°10′46″E
- Country: Poland
- Voivodeship: Kuyavian-Pomeranian
- County: Golub-Dobrzyń
- Gmina: Radomin

Gaj [ɡai̯] is a village in the administrative district of Gmina Radomin, within Golub-Dobrzyń County, Kuyavian-Pomeranian Voivodeship, in north-central Poland.
