= Pustki Działyńskie =

- Village
- Location within Poland
- Coordinates: 53°1′26″N 19°5′50″E
- Country: Poland
- Voivodeship: Kuyavian-Pomeranian
- County: Golub-Dobrzyń
- Gmina: Zbójno

Pustki Działyńskie [ˈpustki d͡ʑaˈwɨɲskʲɛ] is a village in the administrative district of Gmina Zbójno, in Golub-Dobrzyń County, Kuyavian-Pomeranian Voivodeship, in north-central Poland.
