= Dylewo =

Dylewo may refer to the following places:

- Dylewo, Golub-Dobrzyń County in Kuyavian-Pomeranian Voivodeship (north-central Poland)
- Dylewo, Rypin County in Kuyavian-Pomeranian Voivodeship (north-central Poland)
- Dylewo, Maków County in Masovian Voivodeship (east-central Poland)
- Dylewo, Ostrołęka County in Masovian Voivodeship (east-central Poland)
- Dylewo, Warmian-Masurian Voivodeship (north Poland)
