= Laskowiec, Kuyavian-Pomeranian Voivodeship =

Laskowiec
- Village
- Location within Poland
- Coordinates: 53°1′48″N 19°5′52″E
- Country: Poland
- Voivodeship: Kuyavian-Pomeranian
- County: Golub-Dobrzyń
- Gmina: Zbójno

Laskowiec [lasˈkɔvjɛt͡s] is a village in the administrative district of Gmina Zbójno, within Golub-Dobrzyń County, Kuyavian-Pomeranian Voivodeship, in north-central Poland.
