= Elgiszewo =

- Village
- Location within Poland
- Coordinates: 53°4′N 18°55′E
- Country: Poland
- Voivodeship: Kuyavian-Pomeranian
- County: Golub-Dobrzyń
- Gmina: Ciechocin
- Population: 1,000

Elgiszewo [ɛlɡiˈʂɛvɔ] is a village in the administrative district of Gmina Ciechocin, within Golub-Dobrzyń County, Kuyavian-Pomeranian Voivodeship, in north-central Poland. It was part of Prussia from 1815, and then the German Empire from 1871, before becoming Polish again in 1919.
