= Wielkie Rychnowo =

- Village
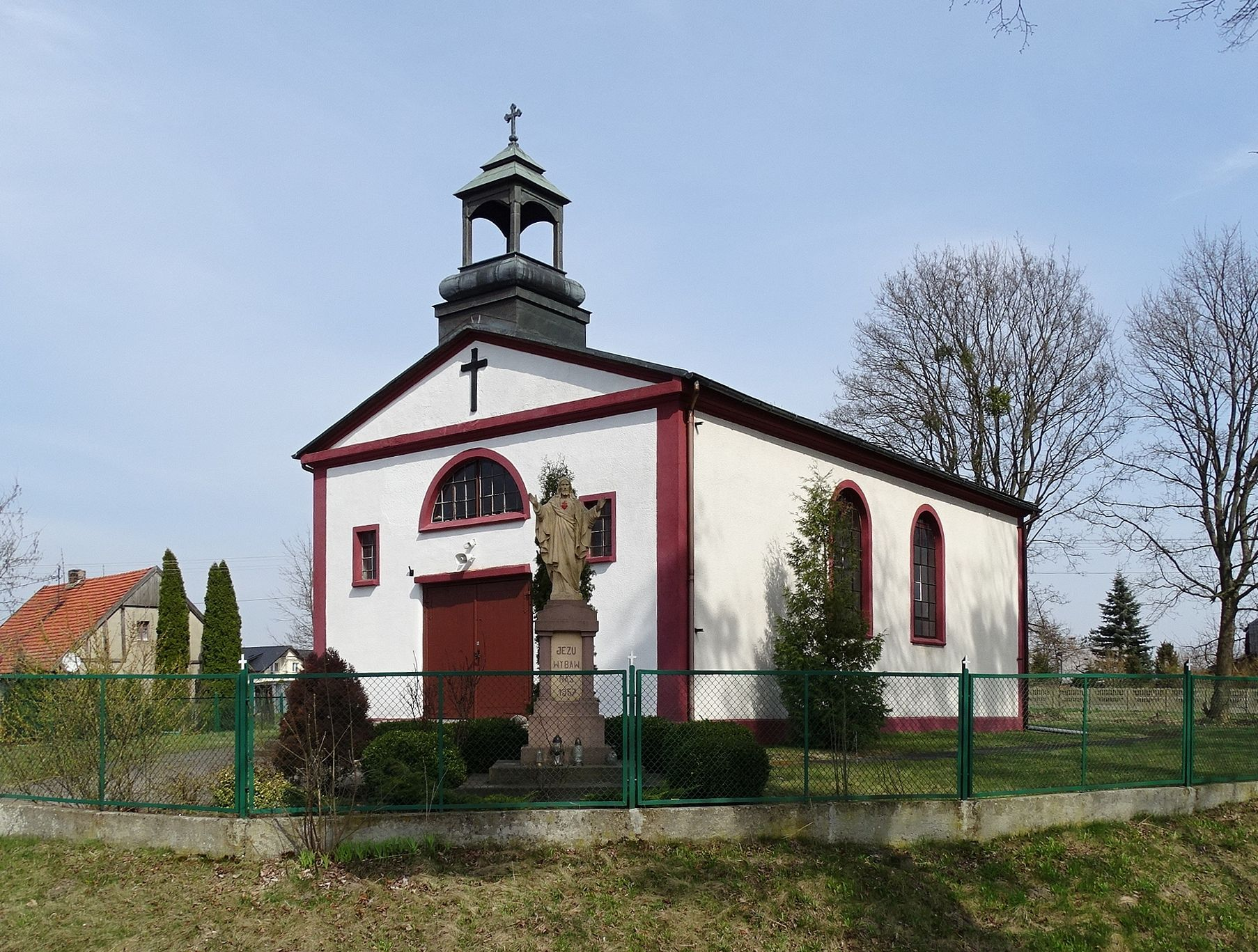
- Chapel of Saint John from 1938

- Location within Poland
- Coordinates: 53°8′N 18°48′E
- Country: Poland
- Voivodeship: Kuyavian-Pomeranian
- County: Golub-Dobrzyń
- Gmina: Kowalewo Pomorskie

Wielkie Rychnowo [ˈvjɛlkʲɛ rɨxˈnɔvɔ] is a village in the administrative district of Gmina Kowalewo Pomorskie, within Golub-Dobrzyń County, Kuyavian-Pomeranian Voivodeship, in north-central Poland.
