= Przystań =

Przystań may refer to the following places:

- Przystań, Kuyavian-Pomeranian Voivodeship (north-central Poland)
- Przystań, Masovian Voivodeship (east-central Poland)
- Przystań, Warmian-Masurian Voivodeship (north Poland)
