= Zapluskowęsy =

- Village
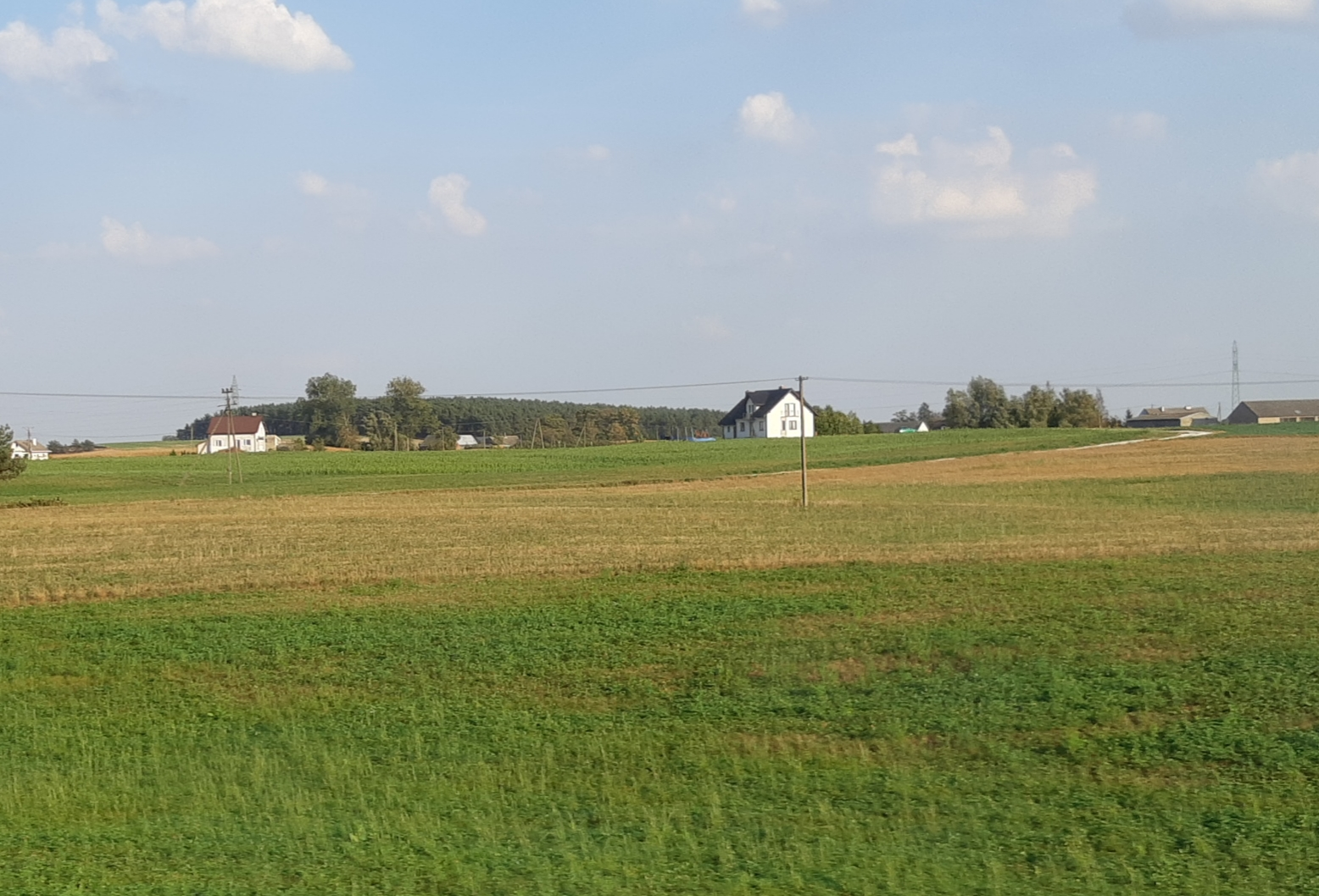

- Location within Poland
- Coordinates: 53°10′32″N 18°54′06″E
- Country: Poland
- Voivodeship: Kuyavian-Pomeranian
- County: Golub-Dobrzyń
- Gmina: Kowalewo Pomorskie

Zapluskowęsy [zapluskɔˈvɛ̃sɨ] is a village in the administrative district of Gmina Kowalewo Pomorskie, within Golub-Dobrzyń County, Kuyavian-Pomeranian Voivodeship, in north-central Poland.
