= Podolina =

- Village
- Location within Poland
- Coordinates: 52°59′N 19°11′E
- Country: Poland
- Voivodeship: Kuyavian-Pomeranian
- County: Golub-Dobrzyń
- Gmina: Zbójno

Podolina [pɔdɔˈlina] is a village in the administrative district of Gmina Zbójno, within Golub-Dobrzyń County, Kuyavian-Pomeranian Voivodeship, in north-central Poland.

The village lies 4 kilometres (2 mi) southeast of Zbójno, 16 km (10 mi) south-east of Golub-Dobrzyń, and 39 km (24 mi) east of Toruń.
