= Pruska Łąka =

- Village
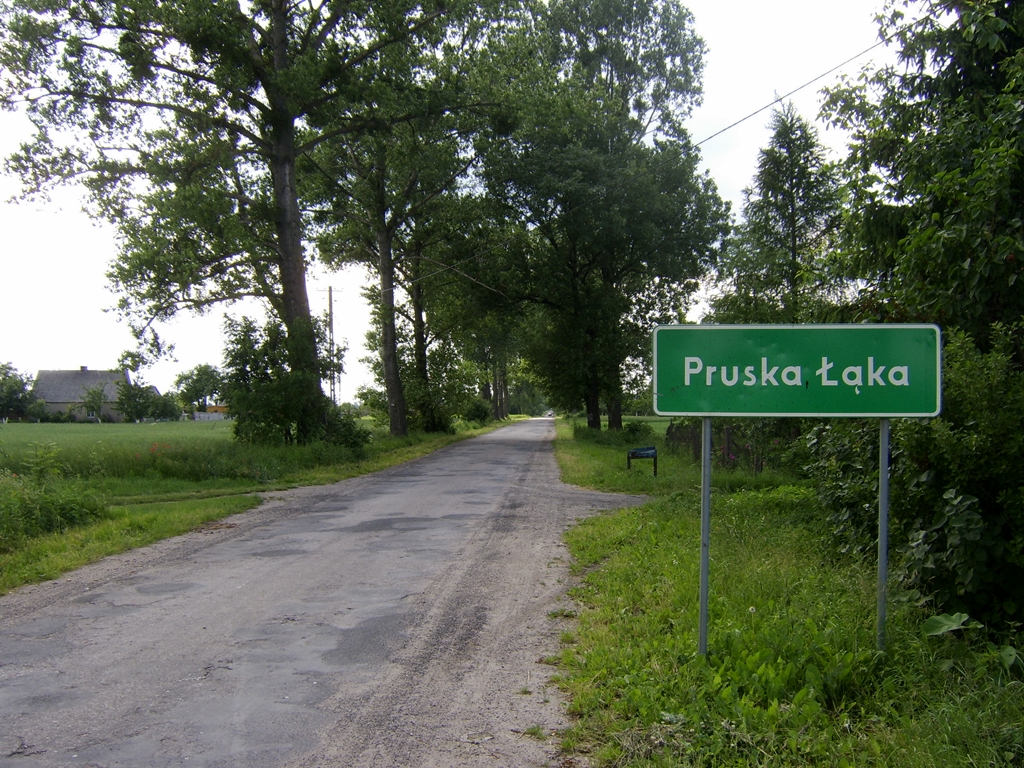
- Entrance to Pruska Łąka Village, Kowalewo Pomorskie, Poland

- Location within Poland
- Coordinates: 53°05′45″N 18°50′20″E
- Country: Poland
- Voivodeship: Kuyavian-Pomeranian
- County: Golub-Dobrzyń
- Gmina: Kowalewo Pomorskie
- Population: 425

Pruska Łąka [ˈpruska ˈwɔŋka] is a village in the administrative district of Gmina Kowalewo Pomorskie, within Golub-Dobrzyń County, Kuyavian-Pomeranian Voivodeship, in north-central Poland.
