= Bocheniec, Kuyavian-Pomeranian Voivodeship =

Bocheniec
- Village
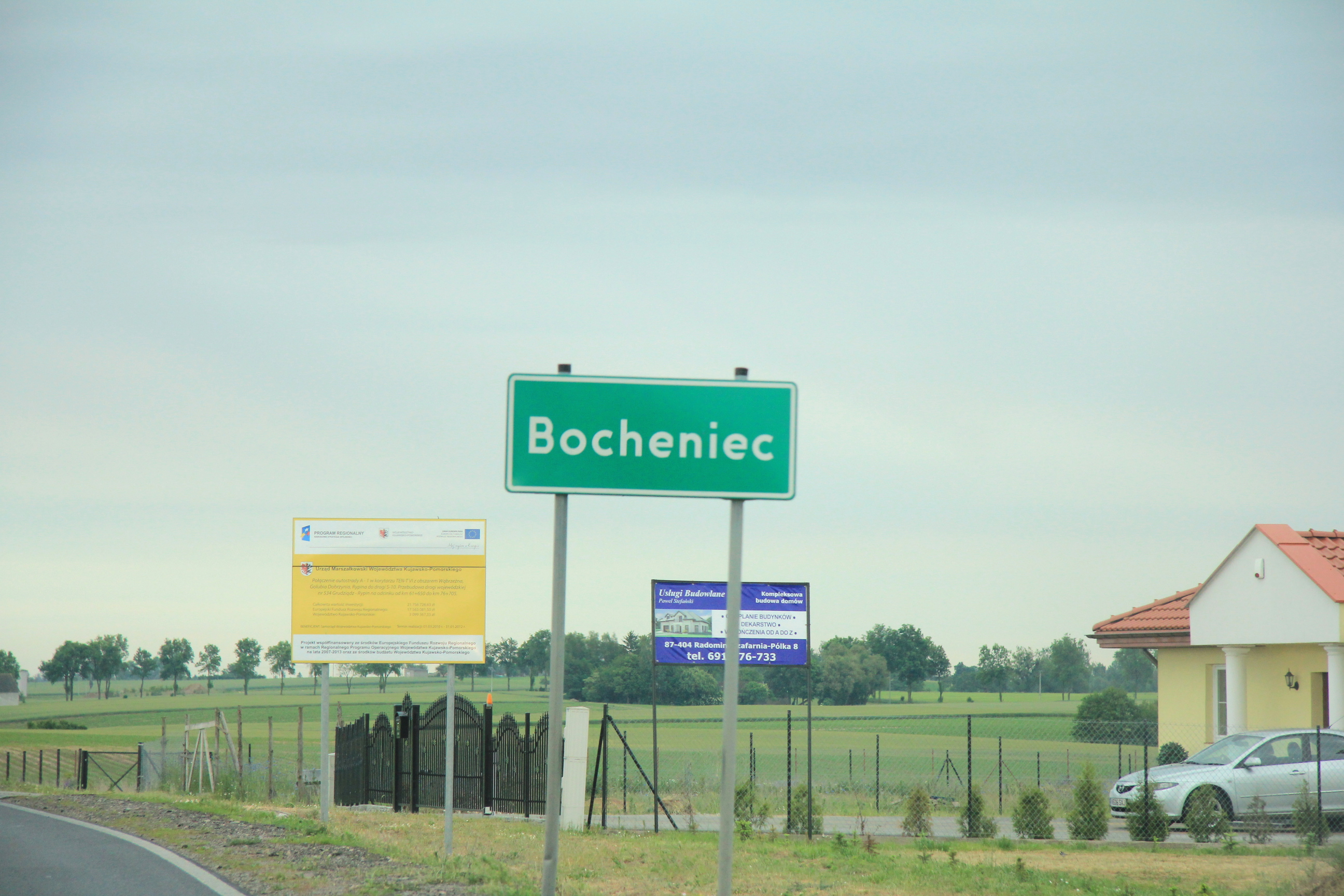

- Location within Poland
- Coordinates: 54°05′48″N 19°09′01″E
- Country: Poland
- Voivodeship: Kuyavian-Pomeranian
- County: Golub-Dobrzyń
- Gmina: Radomin

Bocheniec [bɔˈxɛɲɛt͡s] is a village in the administrative district of Gmina Radomin, within Golub-Dobrzyń County, Kuyavian-Pomeranian Voivodeship, in north-central Poland.
