= Wilczewko =

- Village
- Location within Poland
- Coordinates: 53°04′09″N 19°09′21″E
- Country: Poland
- Voivodeship: Kuyavian-Pomeranian
- County: Golub-Dobrzyń
- Gmina: Radomin

Wilczewko [vilˈt͡ʂɛfkɔ] is a village in the administrative district of Gmina Radomin, within Golub-Dobrzyń County, Kuyavian-Pomeranian Voivodeship, in north-central Poland.
