= Dulsk-Frankowo =

- Village
- Location within Poland
- Coordinates: 53°2′49″N 19°8′48″E
- Country: Poland
- Voivodeship: Kuyavian-Pomeranian
- County: Golub-Dobrzyń
- Gmina: Radomin

Dulsk-Frankowo [ˈdulsk franˈkɔvɔ] is a village in the administrative district of Gmina Radomin, within Golub-Dobrzyń County, Kuyavian-Pomeranian Voivodeship, in north-central Poland.
