= Szafarnia, Kuyavian-Pomeranian Voivodeship =

Szafarnia
- Village
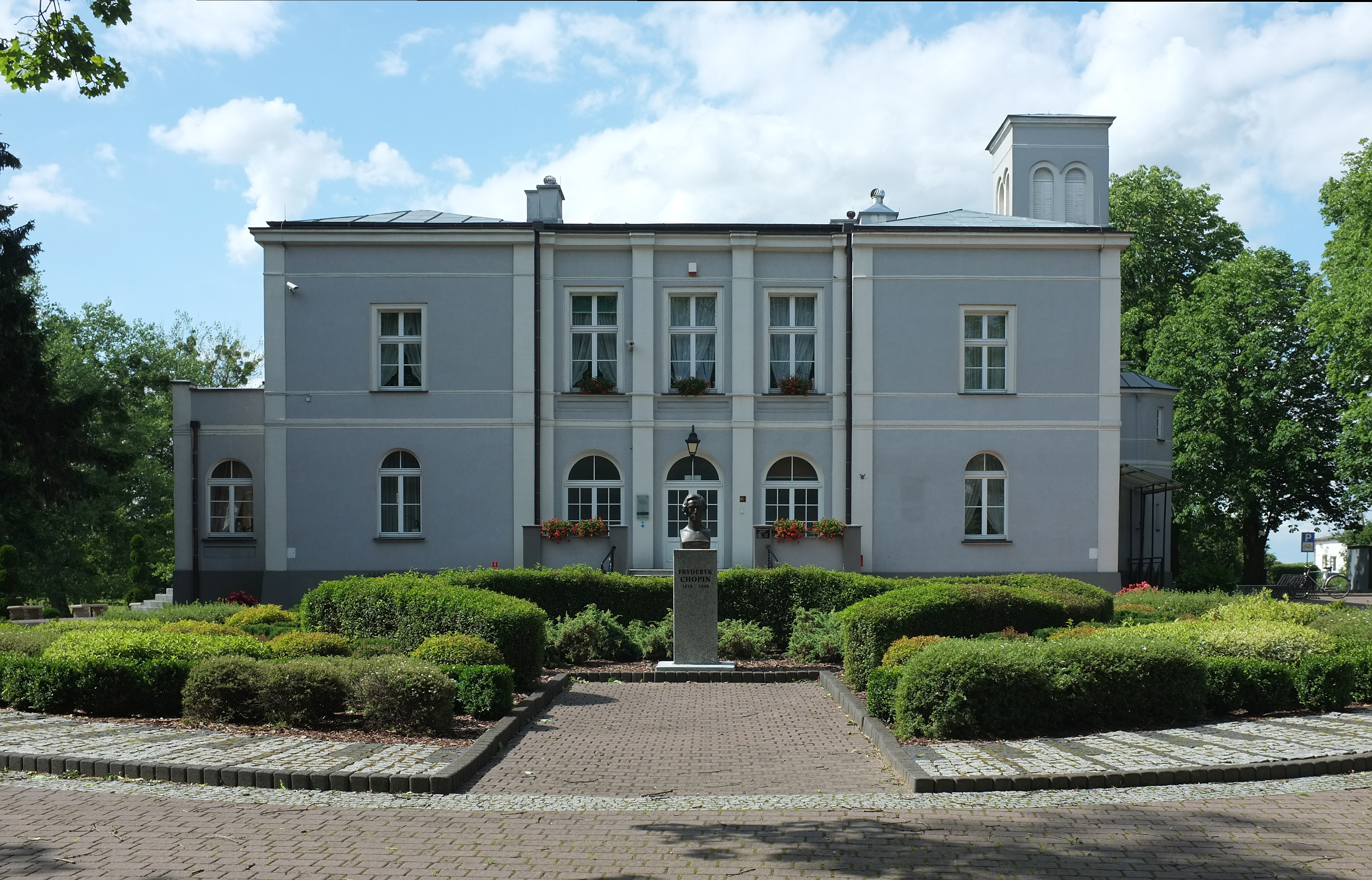
- Szafarnia Manor, with Fryderyk Chopin memorial

- Location within Poland
- Coordinates: 53°6′N 19°8′E
- Country: Poland
- Voivodeship: Kuyavian-Pomeranian
- County: Golub-Dobrzyń
- Gmina: Radomin
- Population: 280
- Time zone: UTC+1 (CET)
  - Summer (DST): UTC+2 (CEST)
- Vehicle registration: CGD

Szafarnia [ʂaˈfarɲa] is a village in the administrative district of Gmina Radomin, within Golub-Dobrzyń County, Kuyavian-Pomeranian Voivodeship, in north-central Poland. It is part of historic Dobrzyń Land.

== Chopin ==
At the age of 14 and 15, Frédéric Chopin visited Szafarnia as the guest of Polish nobleman Juliusz Dziewanowski, father of Chopin's schoolmate Dominik Dziewanowski. Chopin's father was a tutor to the Dziewanowski family and Juliusz was the godfather to Chopin's sister. The families maintained warm relations past Frédéric's death

The manor where Chopin stayed during his 1824 and 1825 summer vacations, has been turned into a museum.

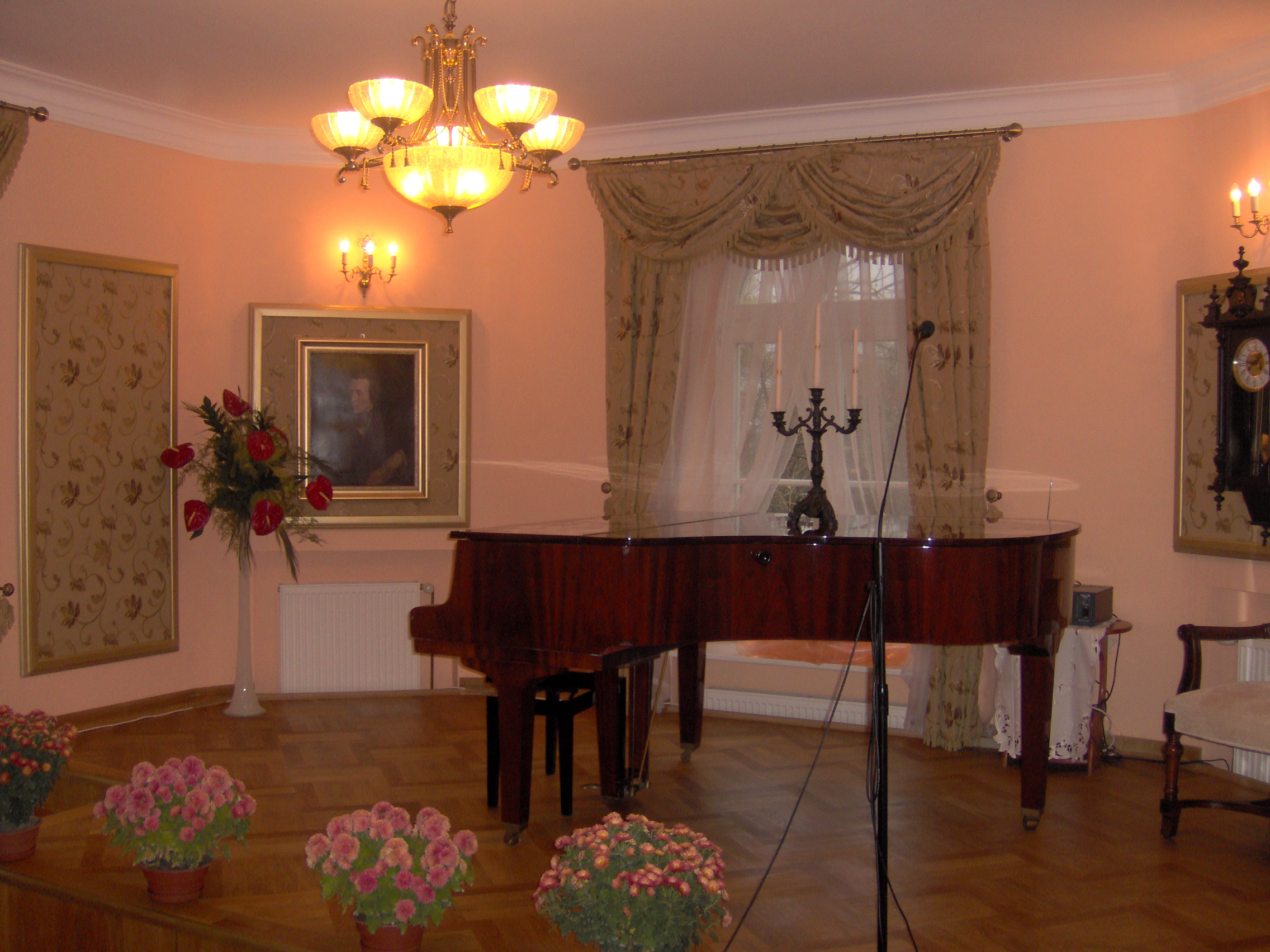
Grand piano in the concert hall of the Szafarnia Manor House, the competition venue

The ″International Chopin Competition for Children and Young People″ is held annually in the Szafarnia Manor House of General Dominik Dziewanowski since 1992. It is conceived as a competition for emerging talent, modeled after the International Chopin Competition, which takes place every five years in Warsaw and is open to pianists between the ages of 16 and 30. The competition was last held with the 33rd edition, taking place from May 27 to 31, 2026. The competition's main objective is the early discovery of young talent and the promotion of the works of Fryderyk Chopin and Polish culture among children and young people in Poland and abroad. The competition is held in three age categories: under 10, under 13, and under 16.
