= Wojnowo, Golub-Dobrzyń County =

Wojnowo
- Village
- Location within Poland
- Coordinates: 53°2′N 19°11′E
- Country: Poland
- Voivodeship: Kuyavian-Pomeranian
- County: Golub-Dobrzyń
- Gmina: Zbójno

Wojnowo [vɔi̯ˈnɔvɔ] is a village in the administrative district of Gmina Zbójno, within Golub-Dobrzyń County, Kuyavian-Pomeranian Voivodeship, in north-central Poland.
