= Nowy Działyń =

- Village
- Location within Poland
- Coordinates: 53°0′39″N 19°3′23″E
- Country: Poland
- Voivodeship: Kuyavian-Pomeranian
- County: Golub-Dobrzyń
- Gmina: Zbójno

Nowy Działyń [ˈnɔvɨ ˈd͡ʑawɨɲ] is a village in the administrative district of Gmina Zbójno, within Golub-Dobrzyń County, Kuyavian-Pomeranian Voivodeship, in north-central Poland.
