= Borówno, Golub-Dobrzyń County =

Borówno
- Village
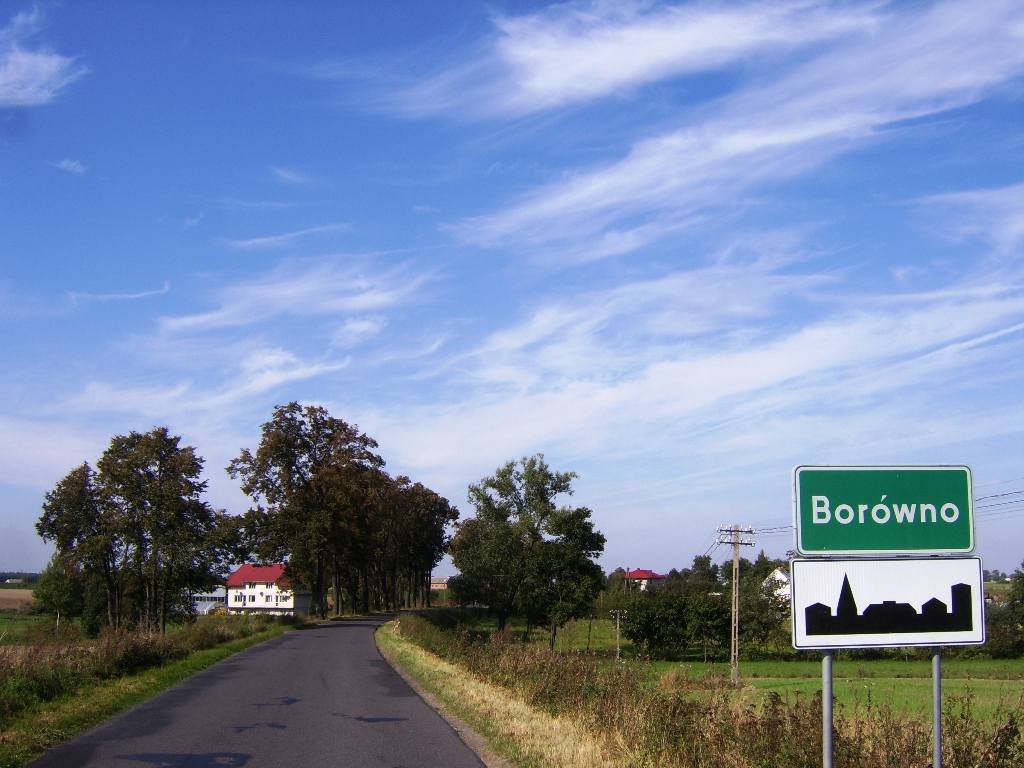

- Location within Poland
- Coordinates: 53°7′56″N 18°49′5″E
- Country: Poland
- Voivodeship: Kuyavian-Pomeranian
- County: Golub-Dobrzyń
- Gmina: Kowalewo Pomorskie

Borówno [bɔˈruvnɔ] is a village in the administrative district of Gmina Kowalewo Pomorskie, within Golub-Dobrzyń County, Kuyavian-Pomeranian Voivodeship, in north-central Poland.
