= Szczutowo, Golub-Dobrzyń County =

Szczutowo
- Village
- Location within Poland
- Coordinates: 53°7′N 19°15′E
- Country: Poland
- Voivodeship: Kuyavian-Pomeranian
- County: Golub-Dobrzyń
- Gmina: Radomin
- Time zone: UTC+1 (CET)
  - Summer (DST): UTC+2 (CEST)
- Vehicle registration: CGD

Szczutowo [ʂt͡ʂuˈtɔvɔ] is a village in the administrative district of Gmina Radomin, within Golub-Dobrzyń County, Kuyavian-Pomeranian Voivodeship, in north-central Poland.

== History ==
Szczutowo was a private village of Polish nobility, including the Polichnowski, Ostaszewski and Jasiński families, administratively located in the Inowrocław Voivodeship in the Greater Poland Province of the Kingdom of Poland.

In 1827, Szczutowo had a population of 100.

During the German occupation of Poland (World War II), in 1941, the German gendarmerie, Einsatzkompanie Thorn and Einsatzkompanie Gotenhafen carried out expulsions of Poles, whose houses and farms were then handed over to German colonists as part of the Lebensraum policy. Expelled Poles were placed in the Potulice concentration camp and then either enslaved as forced labour of new German colonists in the county or deported to the General Government in the more eastern part of German-occupied Poland.
