= Jakubkowo =

Jakubkowo may refer to the following places:

- Jakubkowo, Golub-Dobrzyń County in Kuyavian-Pomeranian Voivodeship (north-central Poland)
- Jakubkowo, Grudziądz County in Kuyavian-Pomeranian Voivodeship (north-central Poland)
- Jakubkowo, Warmian-Masurian Voivodeship (north Poland)
