= Gmina Kowalewo Pomorskie =

Gmina Kowalewo Pomorskie Kowalewo Pomorskie Commune
- Gmina
- Coat of arms
- Interactive map of Gmina Kowalewo Pomorskie
- Coordinates (Kowalewo Pomorskie): 53°10′N 18°54′E
- Country: Poland
- Voivodeship: Kuyavian-Pomeranian
- County: Golub-Dobrzyń
- Seat: Kowalewo Pomorskie

Area
  - Total: 141.39 km^{2} (54.59 sq mi)

Population (2006)
  - Total: 11,292
  - Density: 79.864/km^{2} (206.85/sq mi)
  - Urban: 4,055
  - Rural: 7,237
- Website: http://www.kowalewopomorskie.pl/

Gmina Kowalewo Pomorskie is an urban-rural gmina (administrative district) in Golub-Dobrzyń County, Kuyavian-Pomeranian Voivodeship, in north-central Poland. Its seat is the town of Kowalewo Pomorskie, which lies approximately 13 kilometres (8 mi) north-west of Golub-Dobrzyń and 25 km (16 mi) north-east of Toruń.

The gmina covers an area of 141.39 square kilometres (54.6 sq mi), and as of 2006 its total population is 11,292 (out of which the population of Kowalewo Pomorskie amounts to 4,055, and the population of the rural part of the gmina is 7,237).

== Villages ==
Apart from the town of Kowalewo Pomorskie, Gmina Kowalewo Pomorskie contains the villages and settlements of Bielsk, Borek, Borówno, Chełmonie, Chełmoniec, Dylewo, Elzanowo, Frydrychowo, Gapa, Józefat, Kiełpiny, Lipienica, Mariany, Martyniec, Mlewiec, Mlewo, Napole, Nowy Dwór, Otruda, Piątkowo, Pluskowęsy, Pruska Łąka, Sierakowo, Srebrniki, Srebrniki-Lądy, Szewa, Szychowo, Wielka Łąka, Wielkie Rychnowo and Zapluskowęsy.

== Neighbouring gminas ==
Gmina Kowalewo Pomorskie is bordered by the gminas of Chełmża, Ciechocin, Dębowa Łąka, Golub-Dobrzyń, Lubicz, Łysomice and Wąbrzeźno.
