= Radomin, Kuyavian-Pomeranian Voivodeship =

Radomin
- Village
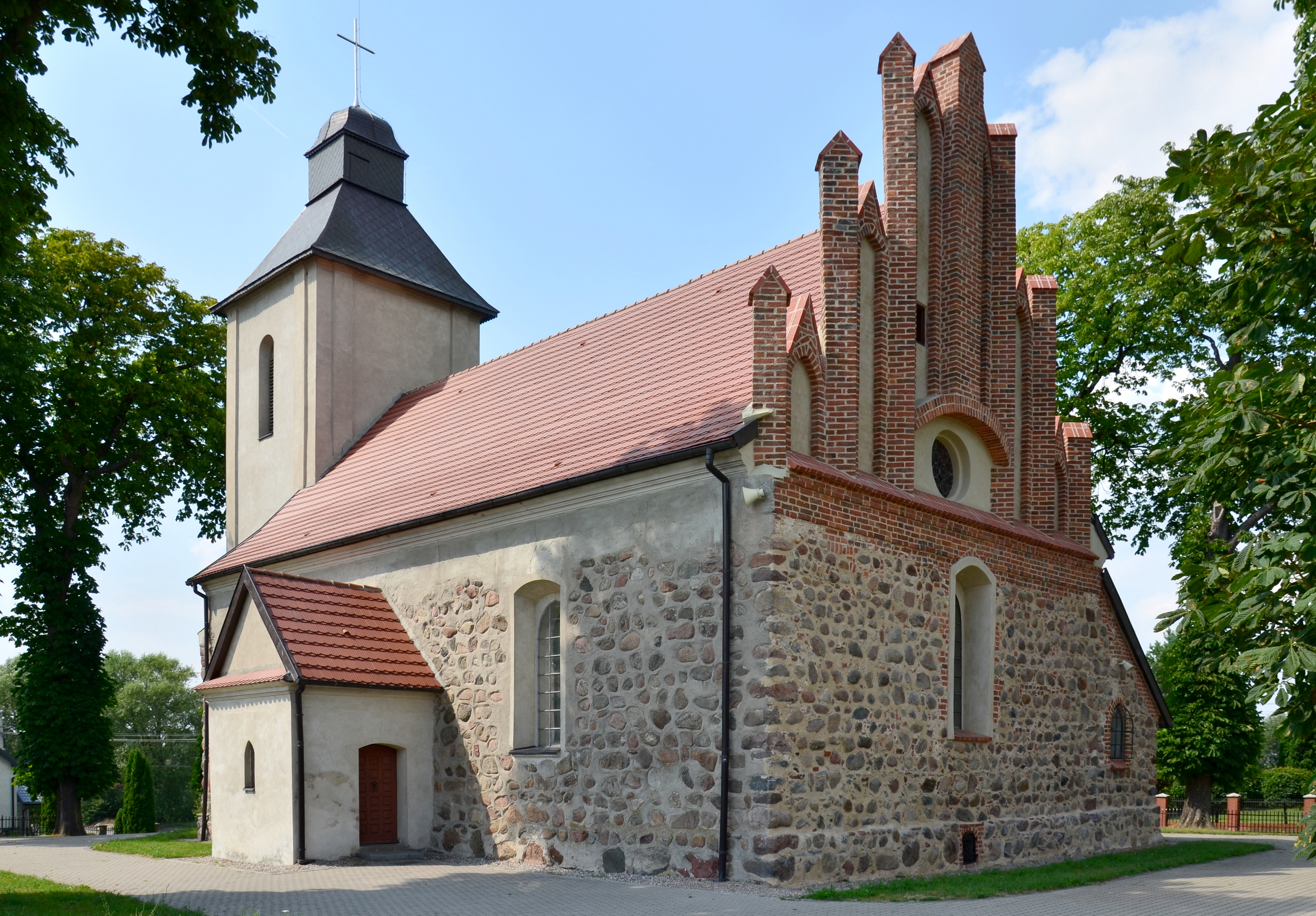
- Church of Saint Nicholas

- Location within Poland
- Coordinates: 53°5′12″N 19°11′42″E
- Country: Poland
- Voivodeship: Kuyavian-Pomeranian
- County: Golub-Dobrzyń
- Gmina: Radomin

Radomin [raˈdɔmin] is a village in Golub-Dobrzyń County, Kuyavian-Pomeranian Voivodeship, in north-central Poland. It is the seat of the gmina (administrative district) called Gmina Radomin.
