= Łukaszewo, Golub-Dobrzyń County =

Łukaszewo
- Village
- Location within Poland
- Coordinates: 53°1′39″N 19°8′41″E
- Country: Poland
- Voivodeship: Kuyavian-Pomeranian
- County: Golub-Dobrzyń
- Gmina: Zbójno
- Population: 230

Łukaszewo [wukaˈʂɛvɔ] is a village in the administrative district of Gmina Zbójno, within Golub-Dobrzyń County, Kuyavian-Pomeranian Voivodeship, in north-central Poland.
