= Kiełpiny, Golub-Dobrzyń County =

Kiełpiny
- Village
- Location within Poland
- Coordinates: 53°10′17″N 18°58′39″E
- Country: Poland
- Voivodeship: Kuyavian-Pomeranian
- County: Golub-Dobrzyń
- Gmina: Kowalewo Pomorskie

Kiełpiny [kʲɛu̯ˈpinɨ] is a village in the administrative district of Gmina Kowalewo Pomorskie, within Golub-Dobrzyń County, Kuyavian-Pomeranian Voivodeship, in north-central Poland.
