= Gmina Zbójno =

Gmina Zbójno Zbójno Commune
- Gmina
- Interactive map of Gmina Zbójno
- Coordinates (Zbójno): 53°0′21″N 19°9′14″E
- Country: Poland
- Voivodeship: Kuyavian-Pomeranian
- County: Golub-Dobrzyń
- Seat: Zbójno

Area
  - Total: 84.38 km^{2} (32.58 sq mi)

Population (2006)
  - Total: 4,519
  - Density: 53.56/km^{2} (138.7/sq mi)

Gmina Zbójno is a rural gmina (administrative district) in Golub-Dobrzyń County, Kuyavian-Pomeranian Voivodeship, in north-central Poland. Its seat is the village of Zbójno, which lies approximately 13 kilometres (8 mi) south-east of Golub-Dobrzyń and 37 km (23 mi) east of Toruń.

The gmina covers an area of 84.38 square kilometres (32.6 sq mi), and as of 2006 its total population is 4,519.

== Villages ==
Gmina Zbójno contains the villages and settlements of Adamki, Ciechanówek, Ciepień, Działyń, Frankowo, Imbirkowo, Kazimierzowo, Kiełbzak, Klonowo, Laskowiec, Łukaszewo, Nowy Działyń, Obory, Podolina, Przystań, Pustki Działyńskie, Rembiesznica, Rembiocha, Rochal, Rudusk, Ruże, Sitno, Wielgie, Wojnowo, Zbójenko, Zbójno and Zosin.

== Neighbouring gminas ==
Gmina Zbójno is bordered by the gminas of Brzuze, Chrostkowo, Ciechocin, Czernikowo, Golub-Dobrzyń, Kikół and Radomin.
