= Ciechocin, Kuyavian-Pomeranian Voivodeship =

Ciechocin
- Village
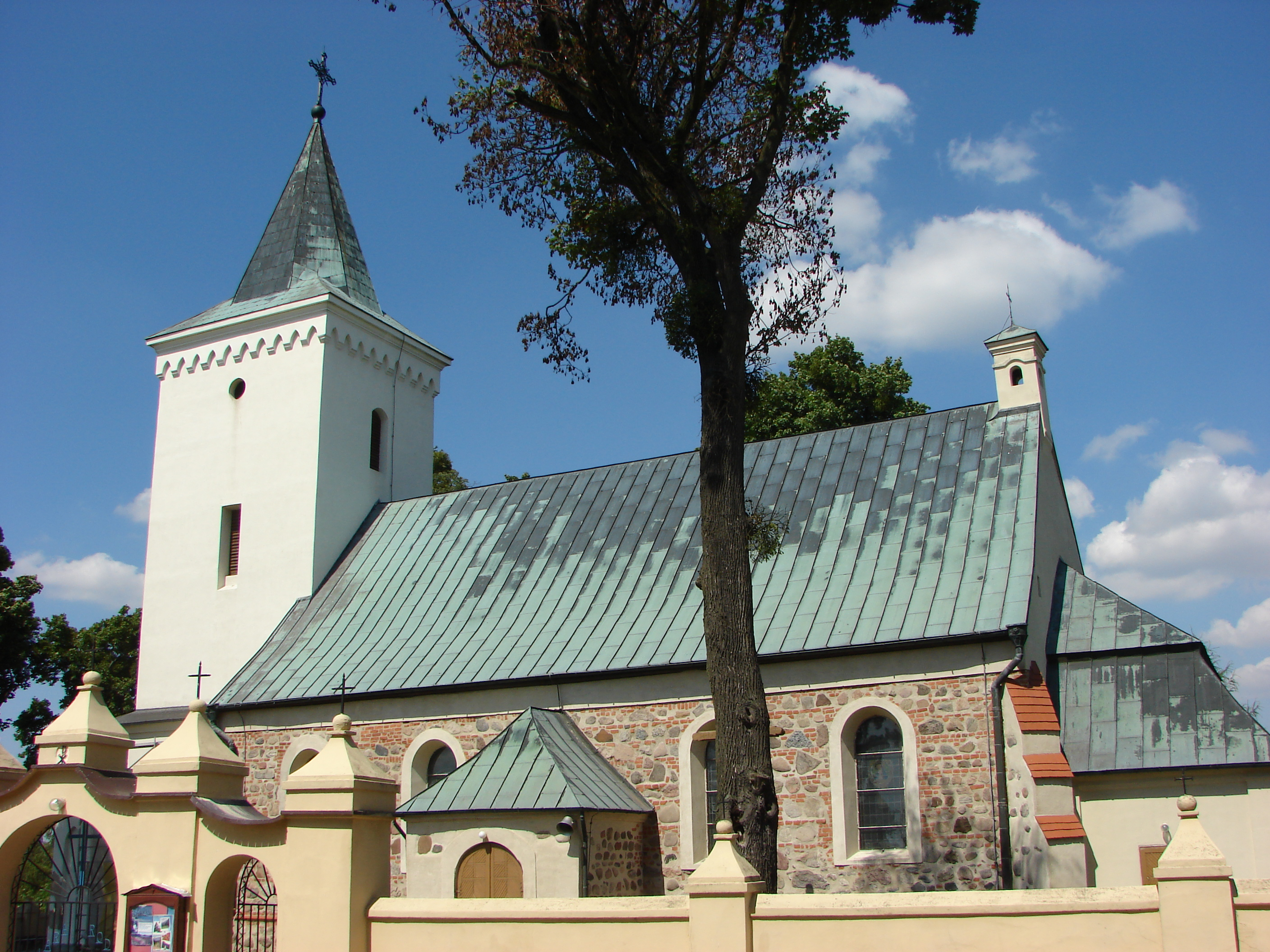
- Parish church of Saint Margaret, built in the 14th century.

- Location within Poland
- Coordinates: 53°3′N 18°55′E
- Country: Poland
- Voivodeship: Kuyavian-Pomeranian
- County: Golub-Dobrzyń
- Gmina: Ciechocin

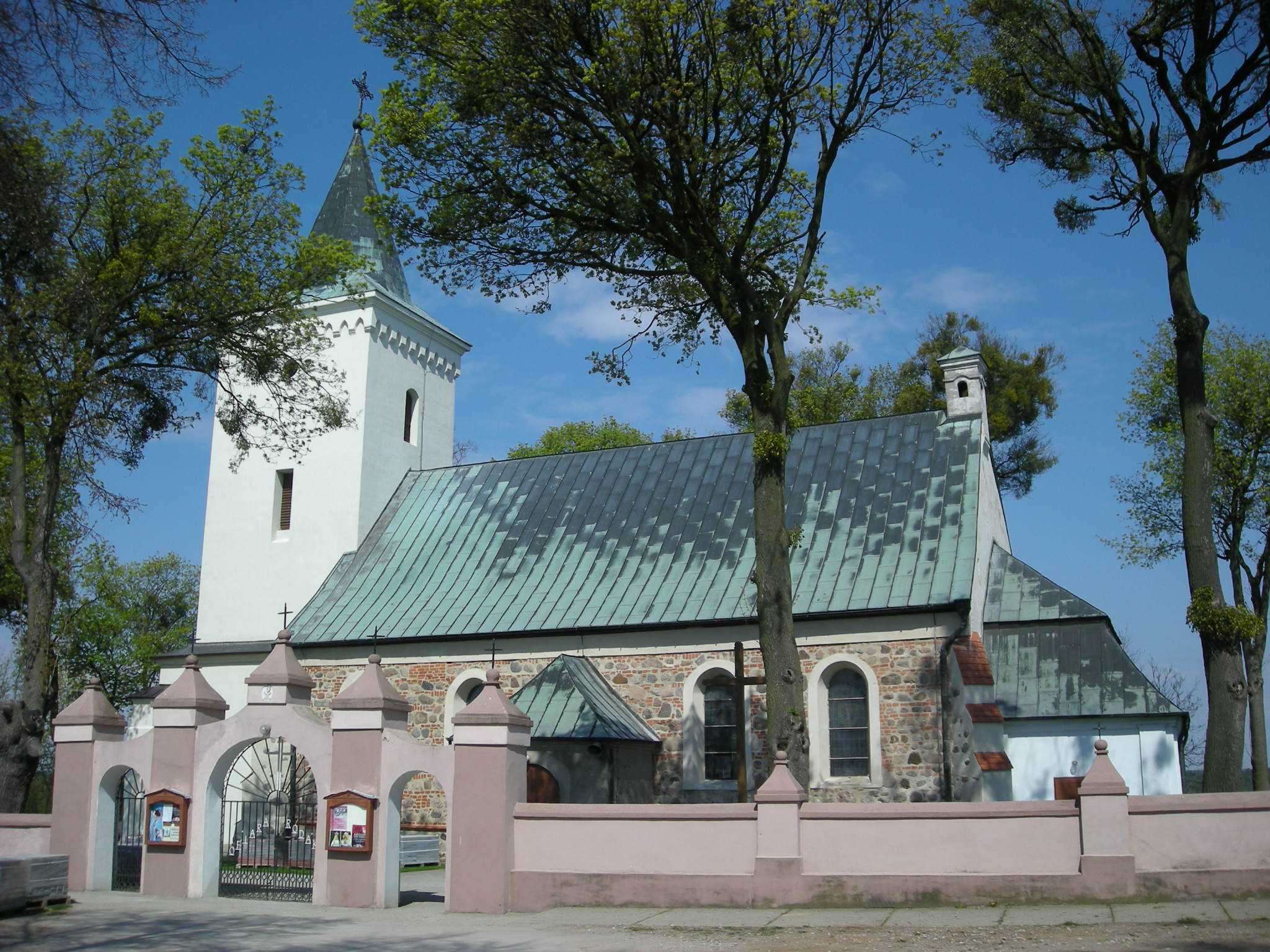
Ciechocin church

Ciechocin [t͡ɕɛˈxɔt͡ɕin] is a village in Golub-Dobrzyń County, Kuyavian-Pomeranian Voivodeship, in north-central Poland. It is the seat of the gmina (administrative district) called Gmina Ciechocin.
