= Gmina Radomin =

Gmina Radomin Radomin Commune
- Gmina
- Coat of arms
- Interactive map of Gmina Radomin
- Coordinates (Radomin): 53°5′12″N 19°11′42″E
- Country: Poland
- Voivodeship: Kuyavian-Pomeranian
- County: Golub-Dobrzyń
- Seat: Radomin

Area
  - Total: 80.77 km^{2} (31.19 sq mi)

Population (2006)
  - Total: 4,104
  - Density: 50.81/km^{2} (131.6/sq mi)

Gmina Radomin is a rural gmina (administrative district) in Golub-Dobrzyń County, Kuyavian-Pomeranian Voivodeship, in north-central Poland. Its seat is the village of Radomin, which lies approximately 10 kilometres (6 mi) east of Golub-Dobrzyń and 40 km (25 mi) east of Toruń.

The gmina covers an area of 80.77 square kilometres (31.2 sq mi), and as of 2006 its total population is 4,104.

== Villages ==
Gmina Radomin contains the villages and settlements of Bocheniec, Dulsk, Dulsk-Frankowo, Gaj, Jakubkowo, Kamionka, Łubki, Piórkowo, Płonko, Płonne, Radomin, Rętwiny, Rodzone, Spiczyny, Szafarnia, Szczutowo, Wilczewko and Wilczewo.

== Neighbouring gminas ==
Gmina Radomin is bordered by the gminas of Brzuze, Golub-Dobrzyń, Wąpielsk and Zbójno.
