= Przystań, Kuyavian-Pomeranian Voivodeship =

Przystań
- Village
- Location within Poland
- Coordinates: 52°59′41″N 19°4′31″E
- Country: Poland
- Voivodeship: Kuyavian-Pomeranian
- County: Golub-Dobrzyń
- Gmina: Zbójno

Przystań [ˈpʂɨstaɲ] is a village in the administrative district of Gmina Zbójno, within Golub-Dobrzyń County, Kuyavian-Pomeranian Voivodeship, in north-central Poland.
