= Płonne, Kuyavian-Pomeranian Voivodeship =

Płonne
- Village
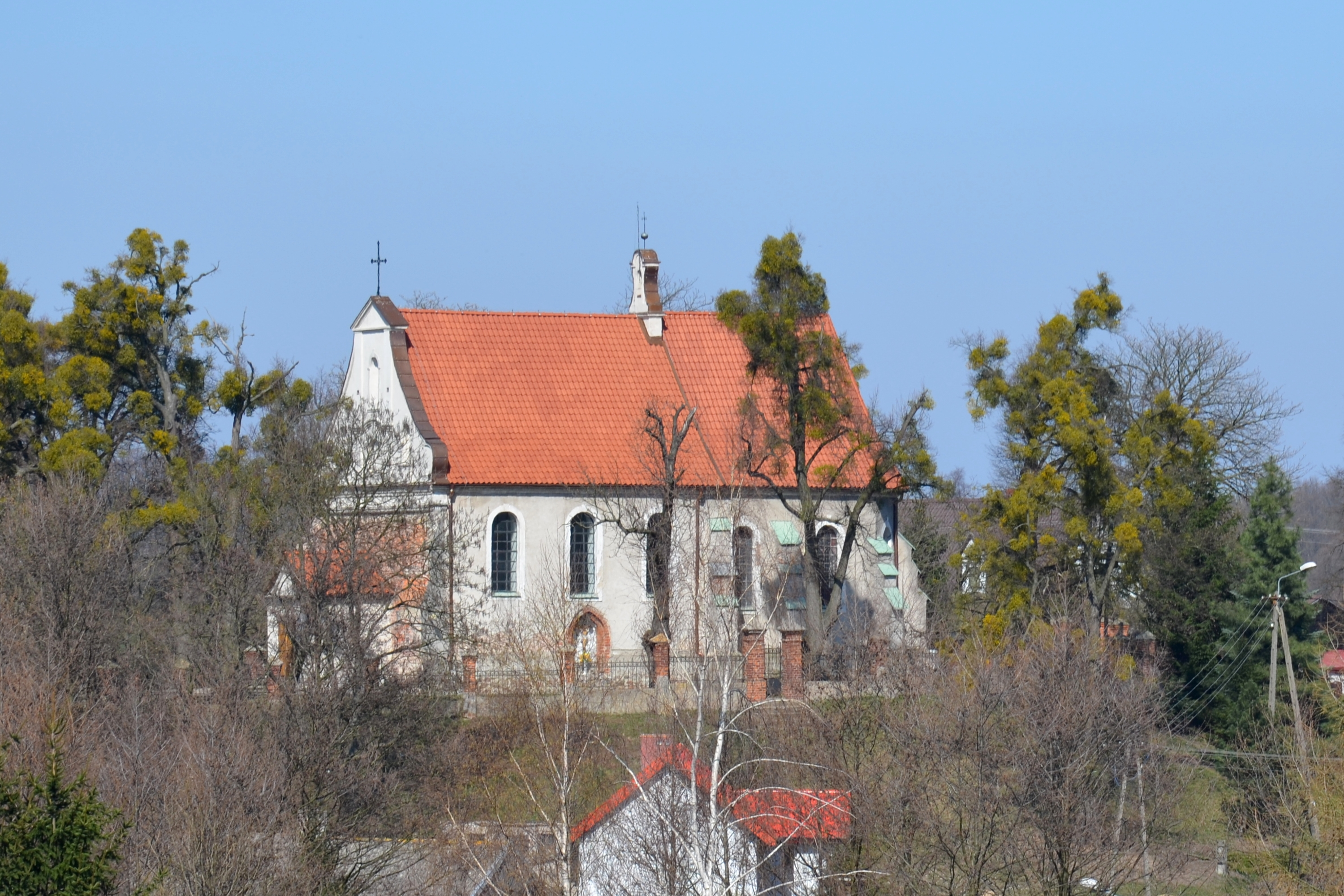
- Church of Saint James the Apostle

- Location within Poland
- Coordinates: 53°7′24″N 19°10′9″E
- Country: Poland
- Voivodeship: Kuyavian-Pomeranian
- County: Golub-Dobrzyń
- Gmina: Radomin

Płonne [ˈpwɔnnɛ] is a village in the administrative district of Gmina Radomin, within Golub-Dobrzyń County, Kuyavian-Pomeranian Voivodeship, in north-central Poland.
