= Jakubkowo, Golub-Dobrzyń County =

Jakubkowo
- Village
- Location within Poland
- Coordinates: 53°8′N 19°14′E
- Country: Poland
- Voivodeship: Kuyavian-Pomeranian
- County: Golub-Dobrzyń
- Gmina: Radomin

Jakubkowo [jakupˈkɔvɔ] is a village in the administrative district of Gmina Radomin, within Golub-Dobrzyń County, Kuyavian-Pomeranian Voivodeship, in north-central Poland.
