= Dylewo, Golub-Dobrzyń County =

Dylewo
- Village
- Location within Poland
- Coordinates: 53°10′34″N 18°59′40″E
- Country: Poland
- Voivodeship: Kuyavian-Pomeranian
- County: Golub-Dobrzyń
- Gmina: Kowalewo Pomorskie

Dylewo [dɨˈlɛvɔ] is a village in the administrative district of Gmina Kowalewo Pomorskie, within Golub-Dobrzyń County, Kuyavian-Pomeranian Voivodeship, in north-central Poland.
