= Gmina Ciechocin =

Gmina Ciechocin Ciechocin Commune
- Gmina
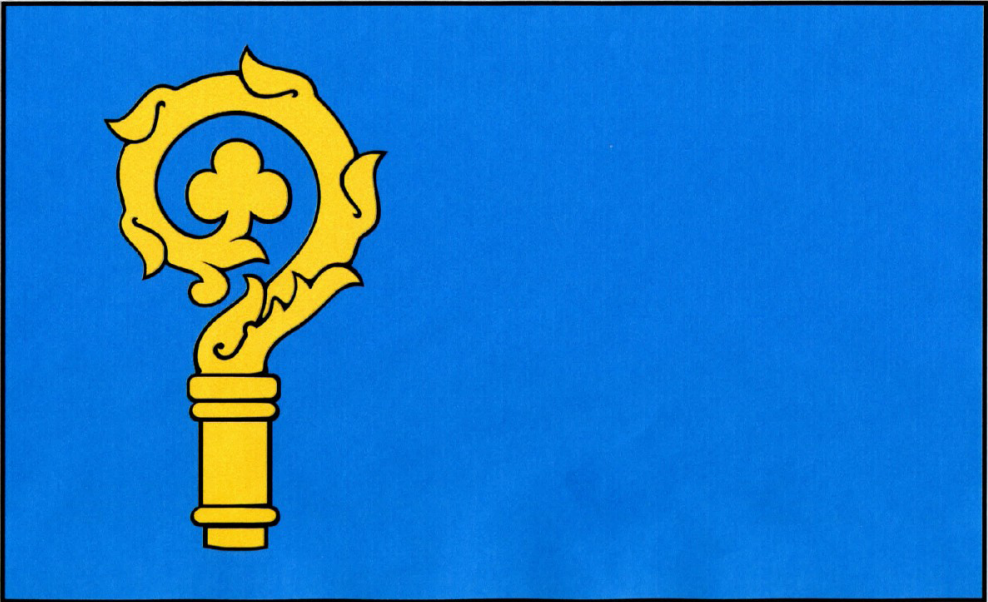
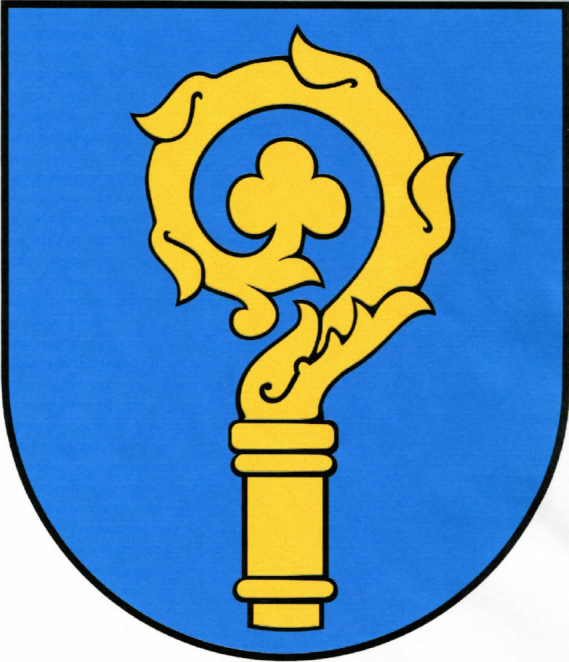
- Flag Coat of arms
- Interactive map of Gmina Ciechocin
- Coordinates (Ciechocin): 53°3′N 18°55′E
- Country: Poland
- Voivodeship: Kuyavian-Pomeranian
- County: Golub-Dobrzyń
- Seat: Ciechocin

Area
  - Total: 101.49 km^{2} (39.19 sq mi)

Population (2006)
  - Total: 4,000
  - Density: 39/km^{2} (100/sq mi)
- Website: http://www.ciechocin.pl/

Gmina Ciechocin is a rural gmina (administrative district) in Golub-Dobrzyń County, Kuyavian-Pomeranian Voivodeship, in north-central Poland. Its seat is the village of Ciechocin, which lies approximately 11 kilometres (7 mi) south-west of Golub-Dobrzyń and 21 km (13 mi) east of Toruń.

The gmina covers an area of 101.49 square kilometres (39.2 sq mi), and as of 2006 its total population is 4,000.

== Villages ==
Gmina Ciechocin contains the villages and settlements of Ciechocin, Elgiszewo, Małszyce, Miliszewy, Morgowo, Nowa Wieś, Piotrkowo, Rudaw and Świętosław.

== Neighbouring gminas ==
Gmina Ciechocin is bordered by the gminas of Czernikowo, Golub-Dobrzyń, Kowalewo Pomorskie, Lubicz, Obrowo and Zbójno.
