= Jovan Valenta =

Serbian surgeon

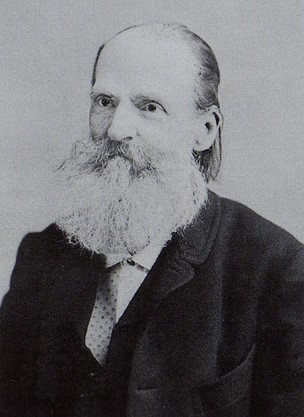
Valenta in 1885

Jovan Valenta (1826 – 7 June 1887) was a Serbian medical doctor. He was a surgeon in Smederevo and Belgrade, manager of a hospital in Palilula, and part-time professor of hygiene. He was also one of the early founders of the Serbian Medical Society.

== Life ==
Valenta was born in Prague, Bohemia, Austrian Empire. He attended both primary and secondary school in his native city before graduating from medical school in 1849, going on to work as a doctor in a local hospital. Three years later he moved to the Principality of Serbia, where he stopped using the Czech name "Jan" and adopted the Serbian name "Jovan". He was a district doctor first in Smederevo, then in Rudnik District (Jagodina) and finally in Valjevo. In 1865 Valenta was appointed head of the First City Hospital in Belgrade, remaining in this position until 1874, when he took a part time professorship in hygiene at the First Belgrade Gymnasium.

In 1862 Valenta became a corresponding member of the Serbian Academy of Sciences and Arts. Two years later he was appointed a full member of the Serbian Learned Society (Department of Natural Sciences and Mathematics), and the next year he became a corresponding member of the Czech Medical Society. In 1868, Valenta joined Dr. Achim Medovich and other colleagues in seeking to establish the Serbian Medical Society, finally succeeding in 1872; only five of the 15 doctors at the founding meeting were Serbs. He was also one of the four founding fathers of the Belgrade Czech Association, the Češka Beseda, established in 1869.

He was a delegate from Serbia to the III International Congress of Doctors in Vienna, held in 1873, and was twice elected to the Serbian parliament. He published the book The Science of Health in 1864, which was followed by Hygiene - The Science of Health (1877) and Separate Hygiene - Dietetics (1881).

Valenta went to Pirot in December 1882, by order of King Milan Obrenović, where he worked as a district doctor and also as the director of the hospital until his retirement in 1886. He died suddenly a year later while staying at a health resort in Banat, in today's Romania.
