= Zbójno, Kuyavian-Pomeranian Voivodeship =

Zbójno
- Village
- Location within Poland
- Coordinates: 53°0′21″N 19°9′14″E
- Country: Poland
- Voivodeship: Kuyavian-Pomeranian
- County: Golub-Dobrzyń
- Gmina: Zbójno
- Population: 841

Zbójno [ˈzbui̯nɔ] is a village in Golub-Dobrzyń County, Kuyavian-Pomeranian Voivodeship, in north-central Poland. It is the seat of the gmina (administrative district) called Gmina Zbójno.
