= Frydrychowo, Pomeranian Voivodeship =

Frydrychowo
- Village
- Location within Poland
- Coordinates: 54°12′30″N 17°43′2″E
- Country: Poland
- Voivodeship: Pomeranian
- County: Bytów
- Gmina: Parchowo
- Population: 17

Frydrychowo [frɨdrɨˈxɔvɔ] is a village in the administrative district of Gmina Parchowo, within Bytów County, Pomeranian Voivodeship, in northern Poland.

For details of the history of the region, see History of Pomerania.

== Notable residents ==
Erwin Blask (1910–1999), German hammer thrower
