= Golub-Dobrzyń County =

Golub-Dobrzyń County Powiat golubsko-dobrzyński
- County
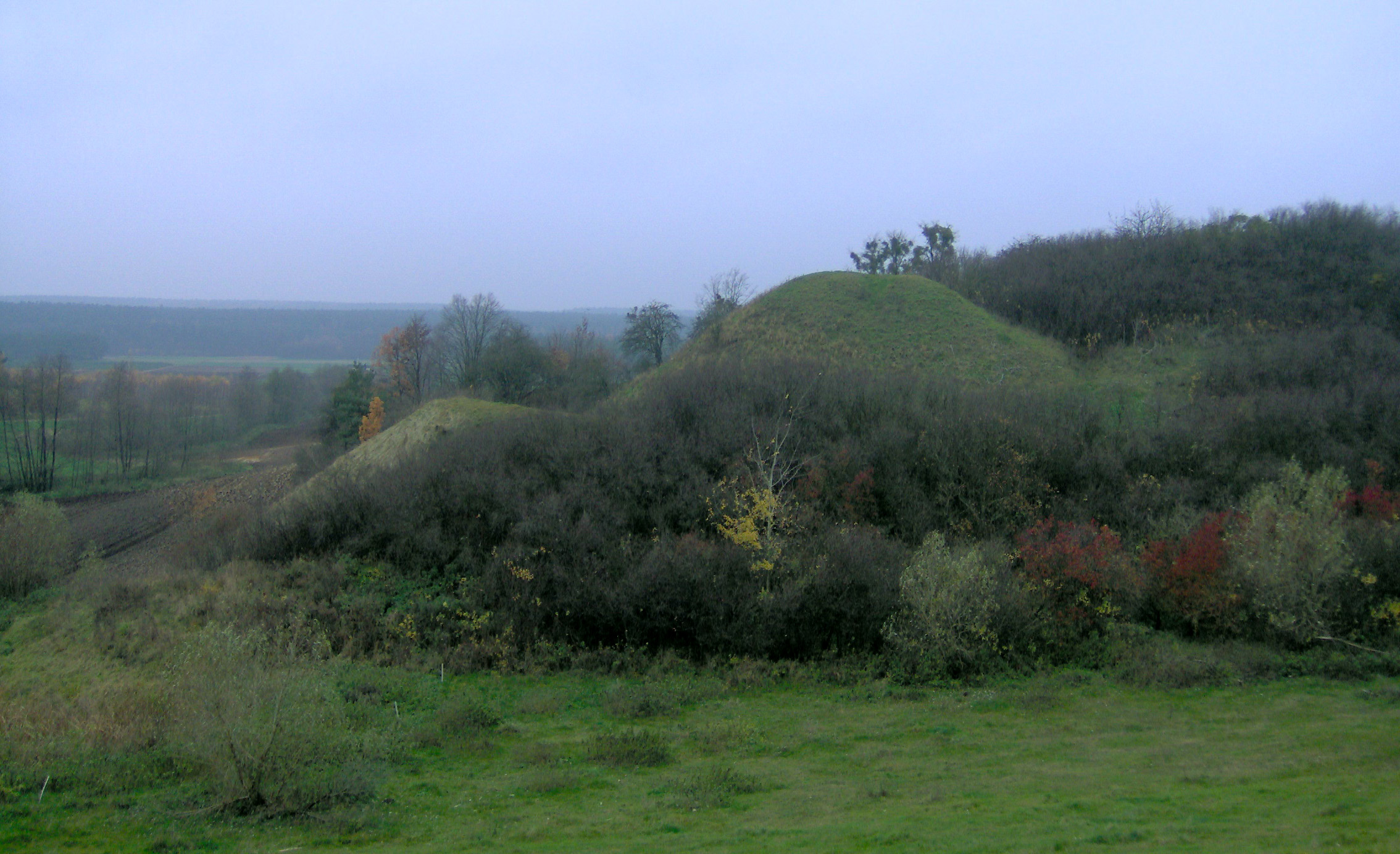

- Flag Coat of arms

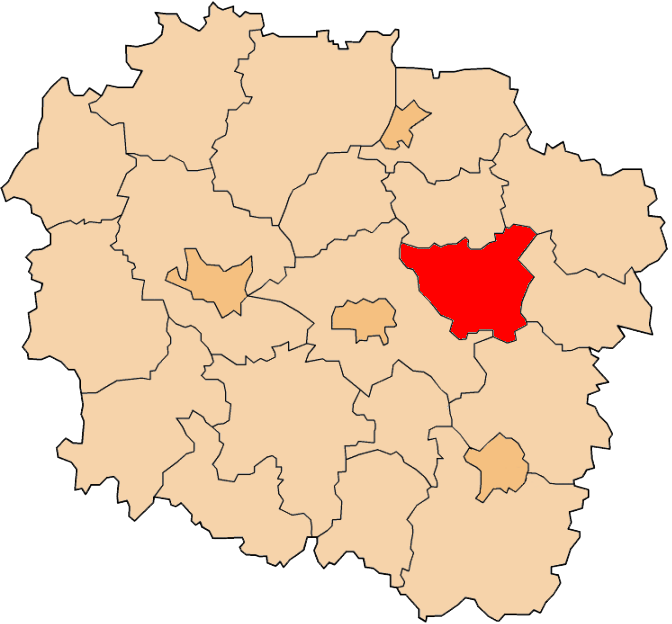
- Location within the voivodeship
- Coordinates (Golub-Dobrzyń): 53°6′N 19°3′E
- Country: Poland
- Voivodeship: Kuyavian-Pomeranian
- Seat: Golub-Dobrzyń
- Gminas: Total 6 (incl. 1 urban): Golub-Dobrzyń; Gmina Ciechocin; Gmina Golub-Dobrzyń; Gmina Kowalewo Pomorskie; Gmina Radomin; Gmina Zbójno

Area
  - Total: 612.98 km^{2} (236.67 sq mi)

Population (2019)
  - Total: 45,059
  - Density: 73.508/km^{2} (190.39/sq mi)
  - Urban: 16,693
  - Rural: 28,366
- Car plates: CGD
- Website: www.golub-dobrzyn.com.pl

Golub-Dobrzyń County (Polish: powiat golubsko-dobrzyński) is a unit of territorial administration and local government (powiat) in Kuyavian-Pomeranian Voivodeship, north-central Poland. It came into being on January 1, 1999, as a result of the Polish local government reforms passed in 1998. Its administrative seat and largest town is the town of Golub-Dobrzyń, which lies 30 km (19 mi) east of Toruń and 71 km (44 mi) east of Bydgoszcz. The only other town in the county is Kowalewo Pomorskie, lying 13 km (8 mi) north-west of Golub-Dobrzyń.

The county covers an area of 612.98 square kilometres (236.7 sq mi). As of 2019 its total population is 45,059, out of which the population of Golub-Dobrzyń is 12,563, that of Kowalewo Pomorskie is 4,130, and the rural population is 28,366.

== Neighbouring counties ==
Golub-Dobrzyń County is bordered by Wąbrzeźno County to the north, Brodnica County to the north-east, Rypin County to the east, Lipno County to the south and Toruń County to the west.

== Administrative divisions ==
The county is subdivided into six gminas (one urban, one urban-rural and four rural). These are listed in the following table, in descending order of population.

Gmina	Type	Area (km^{2})	Population (2019)	Seat
Golub-Dobrzyń	urban	7.5	12,563	
Gmina Kowalewo Pomorskie	urban-rural	141.4	11,471	Kowalewo Pomorskie
Gmina Golub-Dobrzyń	rural	197.5	8,734	Golub-Dobrzyń *
Gmina Zbójno	rural	84.4	4,378	Zbójno
Gmina Ciechocin	rural	101.5	4,032	Ciechocin
Gmina Radomin	rural	80.8	3,881	Radomin
* seat not part of the gmina
