= Głowiński =

Głowiński/ Glowinski (feminine: Głowińska/ Glowinska, plural: Głowińscy) is a Polish surname and may refer to:

== People ==
- Bronisław Głowiński, Głowiński monoplane designer
- Idzi Głowiński, 1743-1745 Mayor of Łódź
- Iwona Glowinska, an actress in the movie Wigilia
- Jacques Glowinski (1936–2020), French academic pharmacist
- Mark Glowinski (born 1992), American football guard
- Michał Głowiński (born 1934), Polish philologist, historian and literary theorist
- Roland Glowinski (1937–2022), French-American mathematician
- Samuel Głowiński, bishop of Lviv, 1733–1776
- Wojciech Głowiński, mayor of Łódź, 1748 and 1761
- Valerie Glowinski, foundation executive director of Zeta Phi Eta

== Other uses ==
- Głowiński monoplane, a 1911 Polish plane

== See also ==
- Głowińsk, a village in Gmina Rypin, Kuyavian-Pomeranian Voivodeship, Poland
