= Rojewo, Rypin County =

Rojewo
- Village
- Location within Poland
- Coordinates: 52°57′45″N 19°21′50″E
- Country: Poland
- Voivodeship: Kuyavian-Pomeranian
- County: Rypin
- Gmina: Rogowo

Rojewo [rɔˈjɛvɔ] is a village in the administrative district of Gmina Rogowo, within Rypin County, Kuyavian-Pomeranian Voivodeship, in north-central Poland.
