= Rogówko, Rypin County =

Rogówko
- Village
- Location within Poland
- Coordinates: 52°58′57″N 19°21′14″E
- Country: Poland
- Voivodeship: Kuyavian-Pomeranian
- County: Rypin
- Gmina: Rogowo
- Population (approx.): 120
- Website: www.rogowo.pl

Rogówko [rɔˈɡufkɔ] is a village in the administrative district of Gmina Rogowo, within Rypin County, Kuyavian-Pomeranian Voivodeship, in north-central Poland.
