= Kiełpiny, Rypin County =

Kiełpiny
- Village
- Location within Poland
- Coordinates: 53°08′51″N 19°19′35″E
- Country: Poland
- Voivodeship: Kuyavian-Pomeranian
- County: Rypin
- Gmina: Wąpielsk

Kiełpiny [kʲɛu̯ˈpinɨ] is a village in the administrative district of Gmina Wąpielsk, within Rypin County, Kuyavian-Pomeranian Voivodeship, in north-central Poland.
