= Podole, Rypin County =

Podole
- Village
- Location within Poland
- Coordinates: 53°6′25″N 19°25′27″E
- Country: Poland
- Voivodeship: Kuyavian-Pomeranian
- County: Rypin
- Gmina: Rypin
- Population: 30

Podole ([pɔˈdɔlɛ]) is a village in the administrative district of Gmina Rypin, within Rypin County, Kuyavian-Pomeranian Voivodeship, in north-central Poland.
