= Trąbin-Rumunki =

- Village
- Location within Poland
- Coordinates: 53°03′09″N 19°14′53″E
- Country: Poland
- Voivodeship: Kuyavian-Pomeranian
- County: Rypin
- Gmina: Brzuze

Trąbin-Rumunki [ˈtrɔmbin ruˈmuŋki] is a village in the administrative district of Gmina Brzuze, within Rypin County, Kuyavian-Pomeranian Voivodeship, in north-central Poland.
