= Gmina Rogowo =

Gmina Rogowo may refer to either of the following rural administrative districts in Kuyavian-Pomeranian Voivodeship, Poland:

- Gmina Rogowo, Rypin County
- Gmina Rogowo, Żnin County
