= Kowalki =

Kowalki may refer to the following places:

== Poland ==
- Kowalki, Kuyavian-Pomeranian Voivodeship (north-central Poland)
- Kowalki, Warmian-Masurian Voivodeship (north Poland)
- Kowalki, West Pomeranian Voivodeship (north-west Poland)

== Lithuania ==
- Kalviai (Varėna district)
