= Stary Kobrzyniec =

- Village
- Location within Poland
- Coordinates: 52°58′22″N 19°19′36″E
- Country: Poland
- Voivodeship: Kuyavian-Pomeranian
- County: Rypin
- Gmina: Rogowo

Stary Kobrzyniec [ˈstarɨ kɔˈbʐɨɲɛt͡s] is a village in the administrative district of Gmina Rogowo, within Rypin County, Kuyavian-Pomeranian Voivodeship, in north-central Poland.
