= Piskorczyn =

- Village
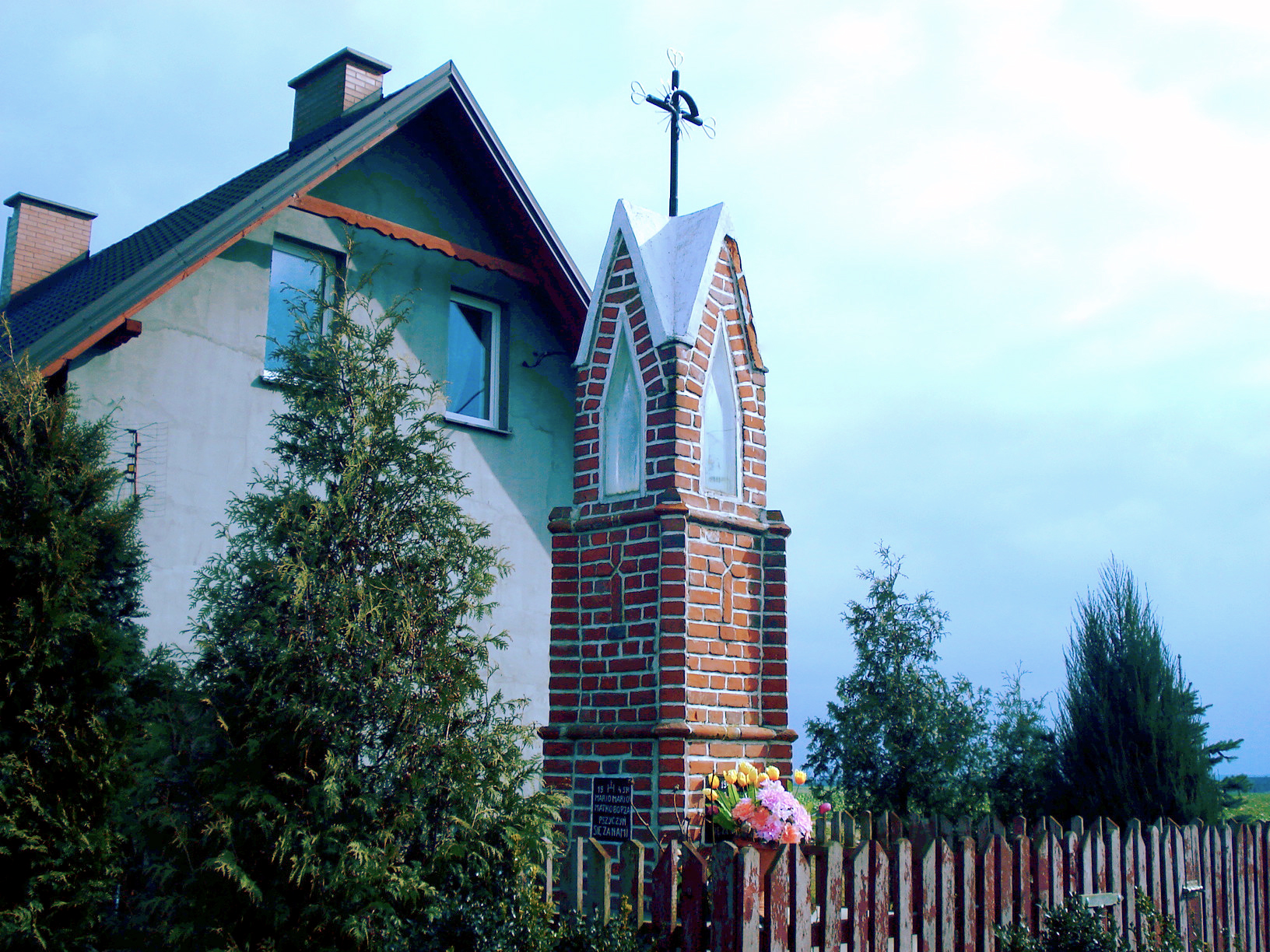
- Wayside shrine in the village center

- Location within Poland
- Coordinates: 53°2′N 19°15′E
- Country: Poland
- Voivodeship: Kuyavian-Pomeranian
- County: Rypin
- Gmina: Brzuze
- Settled: 16th century
- Named for: the name of the founder

Government
  - Sołtys: Sławomir Janusz Bartoszewski
- Elevation: 120 m (390 ft)
- Population: 128
- Time zone: UTC+01:00
- Postal code: 87-522

Piskorczyn [piˈskɔrt͡ʂɨn] is a village in the administrative district of Gmina Brzuze, within Rypin County, Kuyavian-Pomeranian Voivodeship, in north-central Poland. The village has population of 128.

== Demography ==
Changing the number of people in Piskorczyn
