= Okonin, Rypin County =

Okonin
- Village
- Location within Poland
- Coordinates: 53°00′41″N 19°13′30″E
- Country: Poland
- Voivodeship: Kuyavian-Pomeranian
- County: Rypin
- Gmina: Brzuze

Okonin [ɔˈkɔnin] is a village in the administrative district of Gmina Brzuze, within Rypin County, Kuyavian-Pomeranian Voivodeship, in north-central Poland.
