= Lisiny, Rypin County =

Lisiny
- Village
- Location within Poland
- Coordinates: 52°56′34″N 19°22′00″E
- Country: Poland
- Voivodeship: Kuyavian-Pomeranian
- County: Rypin
- Gmina: Rogowo

Lisiny [liˈɕinɨ] is a village in the administrative district of Gmina Rogowo, within Rypin County, Kuyavian-Pomeranian Voivodeship, in north-central Poland.
