= Giżynek, Kuyavian-Pomeranian Voivodeship =

Giżynek
- Village
- Location within Poland
- Coordinates: 53°2′N 19°19′E
- Country: Poland
- Voivodeship: Kuyavian-Pomeranian
- County: Rypin
- Gmina: Brzuze

Giżynek [ɡiˈʐɨnɛk] is a village in the administrative district of Gmina Brzuze, within Rypin County, Kuyavian-Pomeranian Voivodeship, in north-central Poland.
