= Ostrowite, Rypin County =

Ostrowite
- Village
- Location within Poland
- Coordinates: 53°4′N 19°17′E
- Country: Poland
- Voivodeship: Kuyavian-Pomeranian
- County: Rypin
- Gmina: Brzuze
- Population: 1,300

Ostrowite [ɔstrɔˈvitɛ] is a village in the administrative district of Gmina Brzuze, within Rypin County, Kuyavian-Pomeranian Voivodeship, in north-central Poland.
