= Kierz Półwieski =

- Village
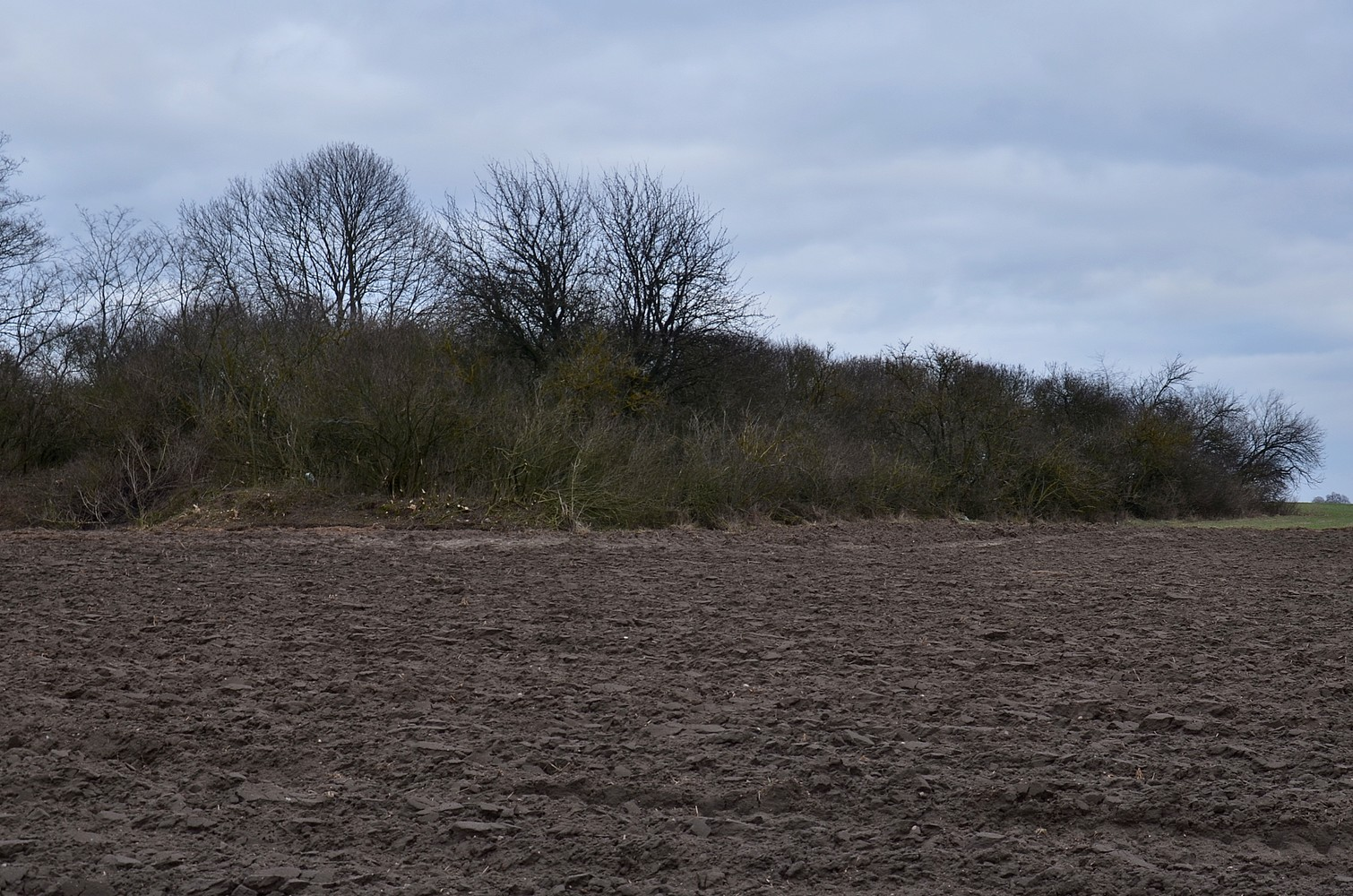
- Evangelical cemetery in Kierz Półwieski

- Location within Poland
- Coordinates: 53°09′17″N 19°14′29″E
- Country: Poland
- Voivodeship: Kuyavian-Pomeranian
- County: Rypin
- Gmina: Wąpielsk

Kierz Półwieski [ˈkʲɛʂ puu̯ˈvjɛski] is a village in the administrative district of Gmina Wąpielsk, within Rypin County, Kuyavian-Pomeranian Voivodeship, in north-central Poland.
