= Półwiesk Mały =

- Village
- Location within Poland
- Coordinates: 53°9′N 19°14′E
- Country: Poland
- Voivodeship: Kuyavian-Pomeranian
- County: Rypin
- Gmina: Wąpielsk
- Time zone: UTC+1 (CET)
  - Summer (DST): UTC+2 (CEST)
- Vehicle registration: CRY

Półwiesk Mały [ˈpuu̯vjɛsk ˈmawɨ] is a village in the administrative district of Gmina Wąpielsk, within Rypin County, Kuyavian-Pomeranian Voivodeship, in north-central Poland.

== History ==
During the German occupation of Poland (World War II), local school teachers were among the victims of large massacres of Poles from the region carried out by the Germans in Skrwilno as part of the Intelligenzaktion.
