= Huta, Rypin County =

Huta
- Village
- Location within Poland
- Coordinates: 53°0′1″N 19°21′49″E
- Country: Poland
- Voivodeship: Kuyavian-Pomeranian
- County: Rypin
- Gmina: Rogowo

Huta [ˈxuta] is a village in the administrative district of Gmina Rogowo, within Rypin County, Kuyavian-Pomeranian Voivodeship, in north-central Poland. Sarah Moon is the electoral mayor.
