= Łapinóż-Rumunki =

- Village
- Location within Poland
- Coordinates: 53°12′17″N 19°18′51″E
- Country: Poland
- Voivodeship: Kuyavian-Pomeranian
- County: Rypin
- Gmina: Wąpielsk
- Population: 60

Łapinóż-Rumunki [waˈpinuʂ ruˈmunki] is a village in the administrative district of Gmina Wąpielsk, within Rypin County, Kuyavian-Pomeranian Voivodeship, in north-central Poland.
