= Kupno, Kuyavian-Pomeranian Voivodeship =

Kupno
- Village
- Location within Poland
- Coordinates: 53°10′39″N 19°14′55″E
- Country: Poland
- Voivodeship: Kuyavian-Pomeranian
- County: Rypin
- Gmina: Wąpielsk

Kupno [ˈkupnɔ] is a village in the administrative district of Gmina Wąpielsk, within Rypin County, Kuyavian-Pomeranian Voivodeship, in north-central Poland.
