= Radziki Małe =

- Village
- Location within Poland
- Coordinates: 53°10′N 19°18′E
- Country: Poland
- Voivodeship: Kuyavian-Pomeranian
- County: Rypin
- Gmina: Wąpielsk

Radziki Małe [raˈd͡ʑiki ˈmawɛ] is a village in the administrative district of Gmina Wąpielsk, within Rypin County, Kuyavian-Pomeranian Voivodeship, in north-central Poland.
