= Ławy, Kuyavian-Pomeranian Voivodeship =

Ławy
- Village
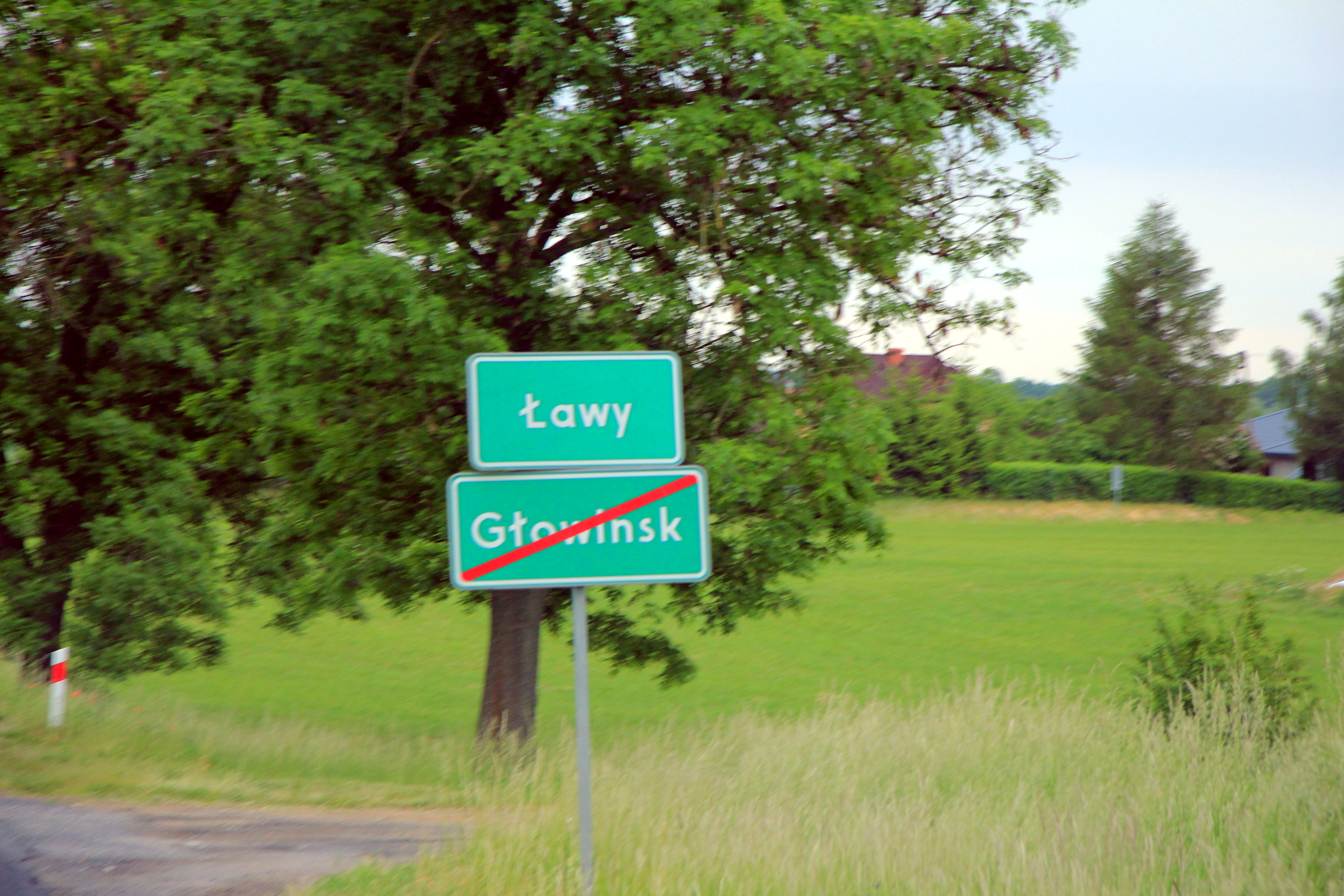

- Location within Poland
- Coordinates: 53°04′09″N 19°23′02″E
- Country: Poland
- Voivodeship: Kuyavian-Pomeranian
- County: Rypin
- Gmina: Rypin

Ławy [ˈwavɨ] is a village in the administrative district of Gmina Rypin, within Rypin County, Kuyavian-Pomeranian Voivodeship, in north-central Poland.
