= Kwiatkowo, Rypin County =

Kwiatkowo
- village
- Location within Poland
- Coordinates: 53°01′57″N 19°30′45″E
- Country: Poland
- Voivodeship: Kuyavian-Pomeranian
- County: Rypin
- Gmina: Rypin
- Time zone: UTC+1 (CET)
  - Summer (DST): UTC+2 (CEST)
- Vehicle registration: CRY

Kwiatkowo [kfjatˈkɔvɔ] is a village in the administrative district of Gmina Rypin, within Rypin County, Kuyavian-Pomeranian Voivodeship, in north-central Poland.

== History ==
During the German occupation of Poland (World War II), in 1941, the German gendarmerie, Einsatzkompanie Thorn and Einsatzkompanie Gotenhafen expelled the entire population of the village, which was placed in a transit camp in Toruń and then deported to Skierniewice in the more south-eastern part of German-occupied Poland.
