= Marianowo, Rypin County =

Marianowo
- Village
- Location within Poland
- Coordinates: 53°6′38″N 19°16′34″E
- Country: Poland
- Voivodeship: Kuyavian-Pomeranian
- County: Rypin
- Gmina: Brzuze

Marianowo [marjaˈnɔvɔ] is a village in the administrative district of Gmina Brzuze, within Rypin County, Kuyavian-Pomeranian Voivodeship, in north-central Poland.
