= Pinino, Rypin County =

Pinino
- Village
- Location within Poland
- Coordinates: 52°58′58″N 19°19′05″E
- Country: Poland
- Voivodeship: Kuyavian-Pomeranian
- County: Rypin
- Gmina: Rogowo

Pinino [piˈninɔ] is a village in the administrative district of Gmina Rogowo, within Rypin County, Kuyavian-Pomeranian Voivodeship, in north-central Poland.
