= Rypałki Prywatne =

- Village
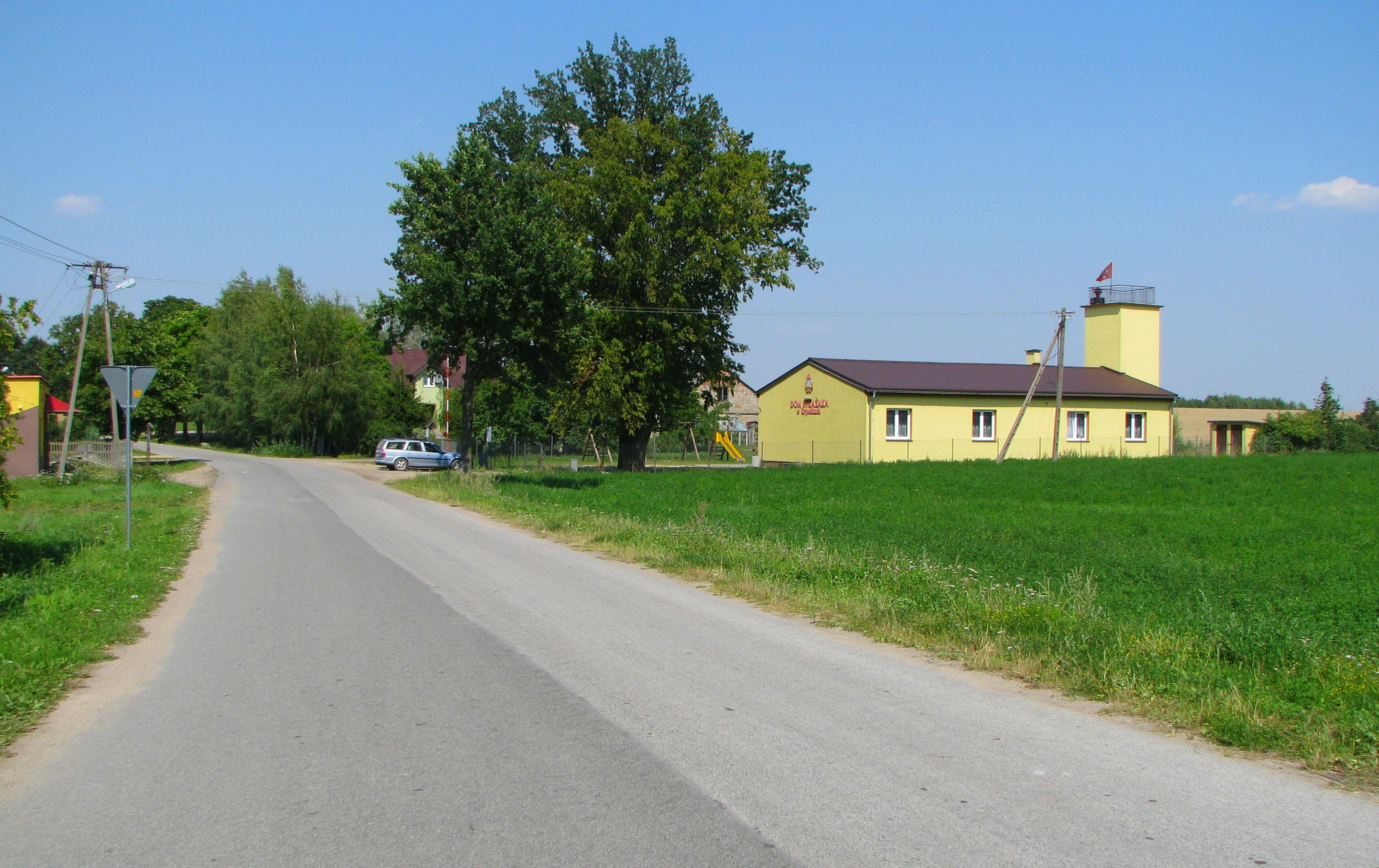

- Location within Poland
- Coordinates: 53°06′04″N 19°27′08″E
- Country: Poland
- Voivodeship: Kuyavian-Pomeranian
- County: Rypin
- Gmina: Rypin
- Time zone: UTC+1 (CET)
  - Summer (DST): UTC+2 (CEST)
- Vehicle registration: CRY

Rypałki Prywatne [rɨˈpau̯ki prɨˈvatnɛ] is a village in the administrative district of Gmina Rypin, within Rypin County, Kuyavian-Pomeranian Voivodeship, in north-central Poland.

== History ==
During the German occupation of Poland (World War II), in 1941, the German gendarmerie, Einsatzkompanie Thorn and Einsatzkompanie Gotenhafen carried out expulsions of Poles, whose houses and farms were then handed over to German colonists as part of the Lebensraum policy. Expelled Poles were placed in the Potulice concentration camp and then either enslaved as forced labour of new German colonists in the county or deported to the General Government in the more eastern part of German-occupied Poland.
