= Narty, Rypin County =

Narty
- Village
- Location within Poland
- Coordinates: 52°56′N 19°30′E
- Country: Poland
- Voivodeship: Kuyavian-Pomeranian
- County: Rypin
- Gmina: Rogowo
- Population: 80

Narty [ˈnartɨ] is a village in the administrative district of Gmina Rogowo, within Rypin County, Kuyavian-Pomeranian Voivodeship, in north-central Poland.
