= Mościska, Gmina Brzuze =

Mościska
- Village
- Location within Poland
- Coordinates: 53°03′07″N 19°18′05″E
- Country: Poland
- Voivodeship: Kuyavian-Pomeranian
- County: Rypin
- Gmina: Brzuze

Mościska [mɔɕˈt͡ɕiska] is a village in the administrative district of Gmina Brzuze, within Rypin County, Kuyavian-Pomeranian Voivodeship, in north-central Poland.
