= Puszcza Rządowa =

- Village
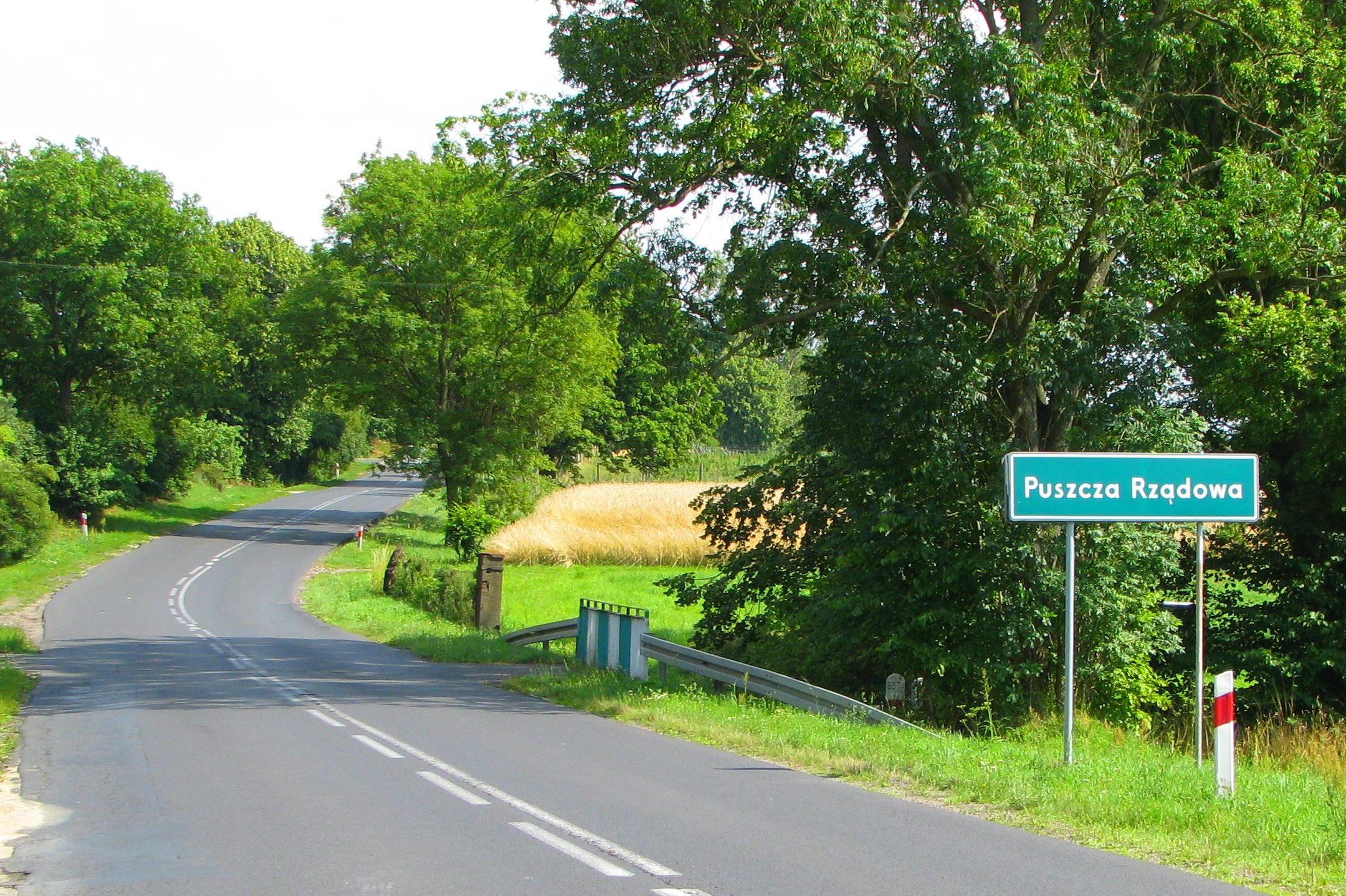

- Location within Poland
- Coordinates: 53°00′05″N 19°29′36″E
- Country: Poland
- Voivodeship: Kuyavian-Pomeranian
- County: Rypin
- Gmina: Rypin

Puszcza Rządowa [ˈpuʂt͡ʂa ʐɔnˈdɔva] is a village in the administrative district of Gmina Rypin, within Rypin County, Kuyavian-Pomeranian Voivodeship, in north-central Poland.
