= Rakowo, Kuyavian-Pomeranian Voivodeship =

Rakowo
- Village
- Location within Poland
- Coordinates: 53°5′27″N 19°19′36″E
- Country: Poland
- Voivodeship: Kuyavian-Pomeranian
- County: Rypin
- Gmina: Rypin
- Population: 110

Rakowo [raˈkɔvɔ] is a village in the administrative district of Gmina Rypin, within Rypin County, Kuyavian-Pomeranian Voivodeship, in north-central Poland.
