= Kosiory =

- Village
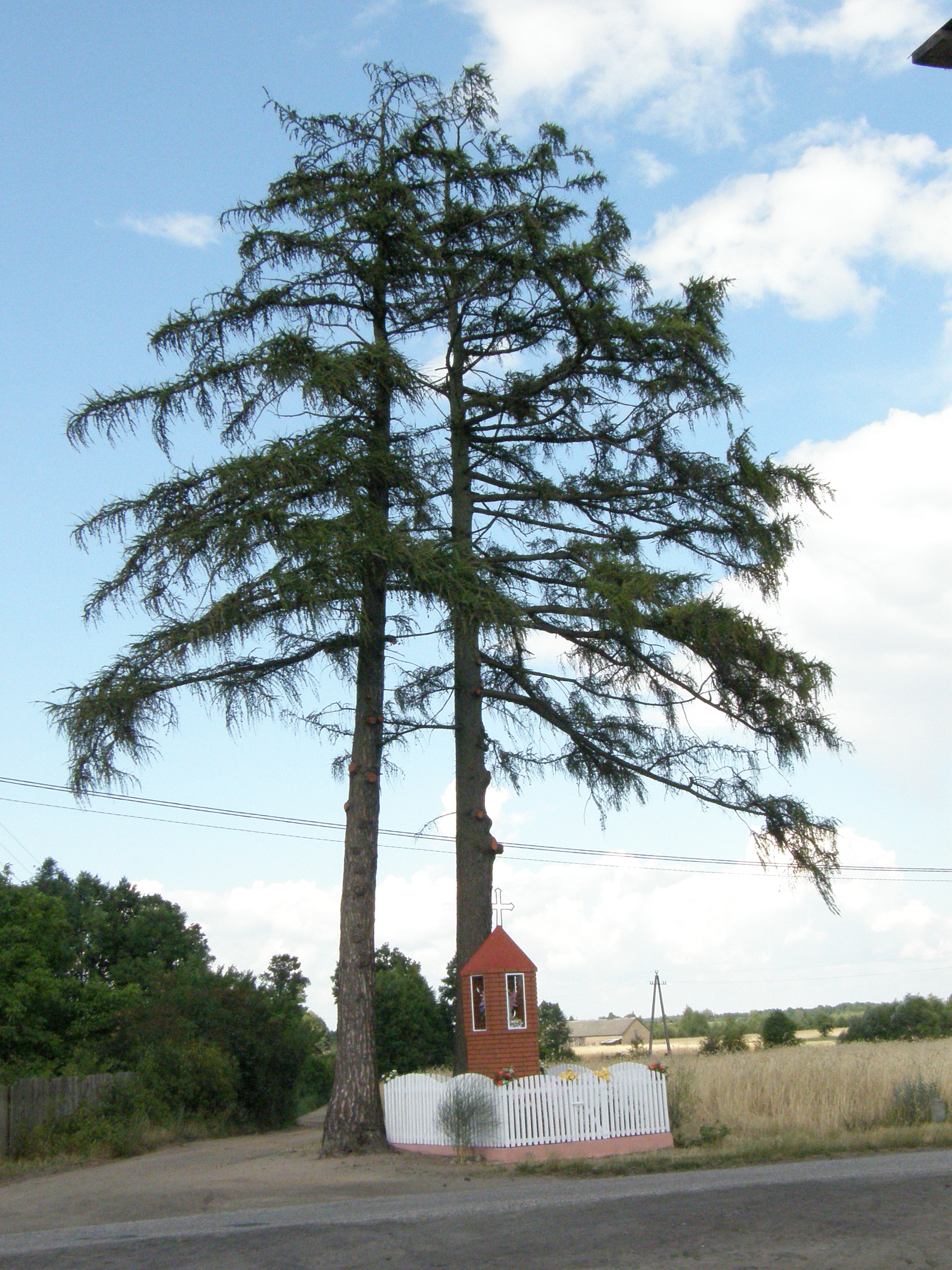

- Location within Poland
- Coordinates: 52°58′N 19°28′E
- Country: Poland
- Voivodeship: Kuyavian-Pomeranian
- County: Rypin
- Gmina: Rogowo
- Time zone: UTC+1 (CET)
  - Summer (DST): UTC+2 (CEST)
- Vehicle registration: CRY

Kosiory [kɔˈɕɔrɨ] is a village in the administrative district of Gmina Rogowo, within Rypin County, Kuyavian-Pomeranian Voivodeship, in north-central Poland.

Four Polish citizens were murdered by Nazi Germany in the village during World War II.
