= Iwany =

- Village
- Location within Poland
- Coordinates: 53°4′40″N 19°27′26″E
- Country: Poland
- Voivodeship: Kuyavian-Pomeranian
- County: Rypin
- Gmina: Rypin
- Population: 100

Iwany [iˈvanɨ] is a village in the administrative district of Gmina Rypin, within Rypin County, Kuyavian-Pomeranian Voivodeship, in north-central Poland.
