= Starorypin Rządowy =

- Village
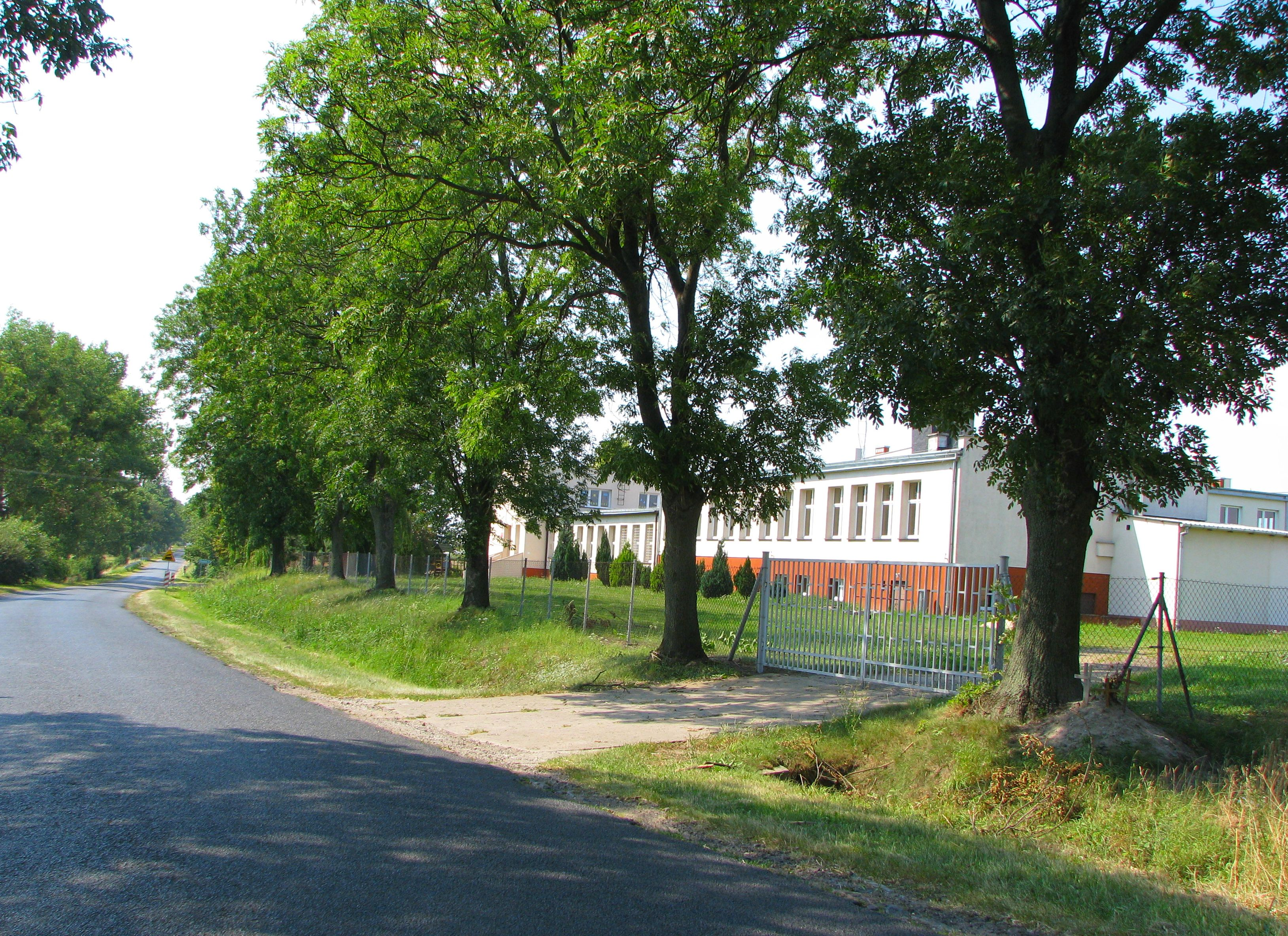

- Location within Poland
- Coordinates: 53°5′26″N 19°24′34″E
- Country: Poland
- Voivodeship: Kuyavian-Pomeranian
- County: Rypin
- Gmina: Rypin
- Population: 230

Starorypin Rządowy [starɔˈrɨpin ʐɔnˈdɔvɨ] is a village in the administrative district of Gmina Rypin, within Rypin County, Kuyavian-Pomeranian Voivodeship, in north-central Poland.
