= Somsiory =

- Village
- Location within Poland
- Coordinates: 53°1′N 19°18′E
- Country: Poland
- Voivodeship: Kuyavian-Pomeranian
- County: Rypin
- Gmina: Brzuze

Somsiory [sɔmˈɕɔrɨ] is a village in the administrative district of Gmina Brzuze, within Rypin County, Kuyavian-Pomeranian Voivodeship, in north-central Poland.
