= Dębiany, Kuyavian-Pomeranian Voivodeship =

Dębiany
- Village
- Location within Poland
- Coordinates: 53°2′N 19°28′E
- Country: Poland
- Voivodeship: Kuyavian-Pomeranian
- County: Rypin
- Gmina: Rypin

Dębiany [dɛmˈbjanɨ] is a village in the administrative district of Gmina Rypin, within Rypin County, Kuyavian-Pomeranian Voivodeship, in north-central Poland.
