= Tomkowo =

- Village
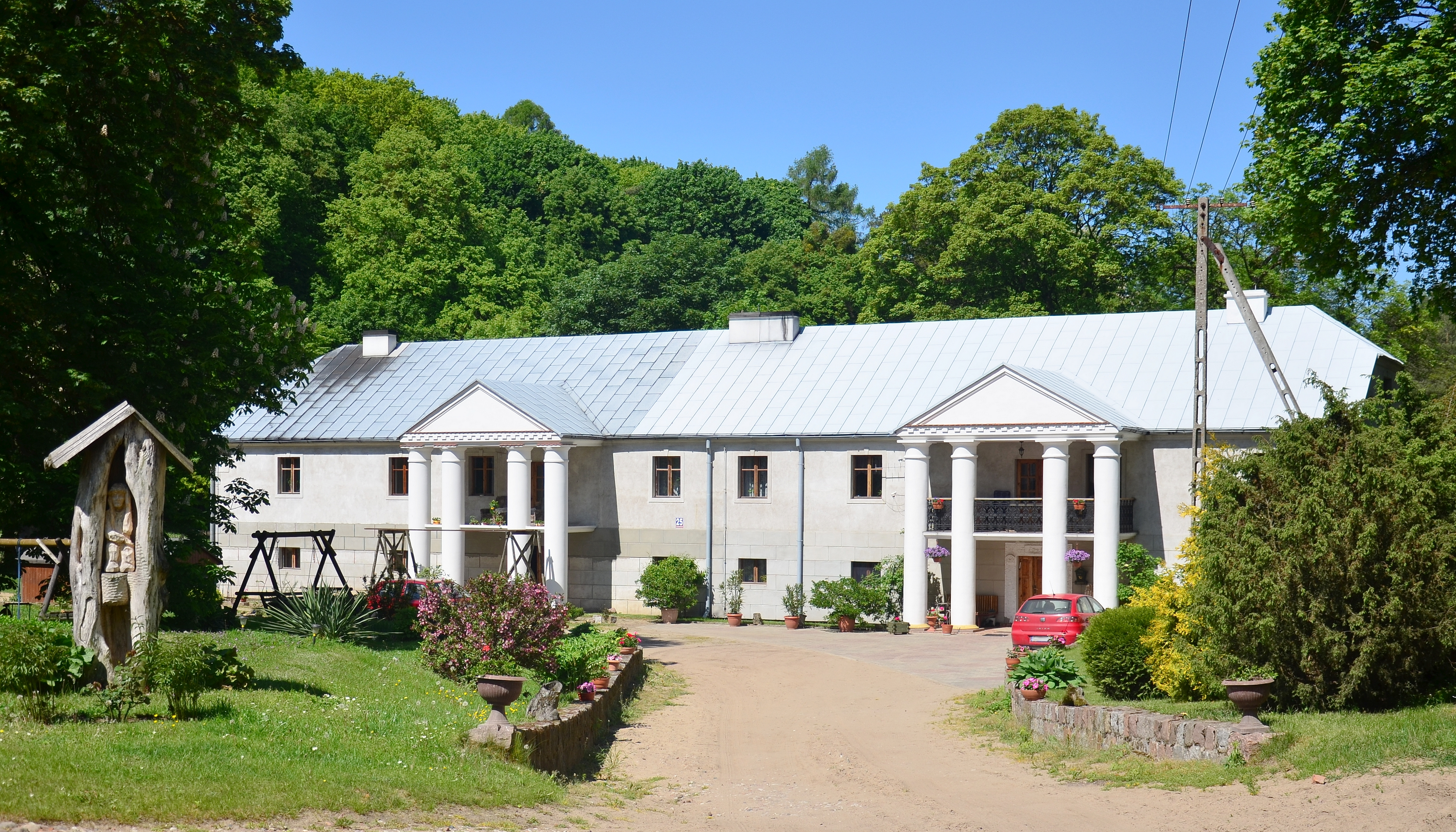

- Location within Poland
- Coordinates: 53°09′10″N 19°12′0″E
- Country: Poland
- Voivodeship: Kuyavian-Pomeranian
- County: Rypin
- Gmina: Wąpielsk

Tomkowo [tɔmˈkɔvɔ] is a village in the administrative district of Gmina Wąpielsk, within Rypin County, Kuyavian-Pomeranian Voivodeship, in north-central Poland.
