= Starorypin Prywatny =

- Village
- Location within Poland
- Coordinates: 53°5′17″N 19°26′3″E
- Country: Poland
- Voivodeship: Kuyavian-Pomeranian
- County: Rypin
- Gmina: Rypin
- Population: 90

Starorypin Prywatny [starɔˈrɨpin prɨˈvatnɨ] is a village in the administrative district of Gmina Rypin, within Rypin County, Kuyavian-Pomeranian Voivodeship, in north-central Poland.
