= Łapinóżek =

- Village
- Location within Poland
- Coordinates: 53°11′N 19°20′E
- Country: Poland
- Voivodeship: Kuyavian-Pomeranian
- County: Rypin
- Gmina: Wąpielsk

Łapinóżek [wapiˈnuʐɛk] is a village in the administrative district of Gmina Wąpielsk, within Rypin County, Kuyavian-Pomeranian Voivodeship, in north-central Poland.
