= Rumunki Likieckie =

- Village
- Location within Poland
- Coordinates: 52°56′N 19°26′E
- Country: Poland
- Voivodeship: Kuyavian-Pomeranian
- County: Rypin
- Gmina: Rogowo

Rumunki Likieckie [ruˈmuŋki liˈkʲɛt͡skʲɛ] is a village in the administrative district of Gmina Rogowo, within Rypin County, Kuyavian-Pomeranian Voivodeship, in north-central Poland.
