= Czumsk Duży =

- Village
- Location within Poland
- Coordinates: 52°58′N 19°30′E
- Country: Poland
- Voivodeship: Kuyavian-Pomeranian
- County: Rypin
- Gmina: Rogowo

Czumsk Duży [ˈt͡ʂumsk ˈduʐɨ] is a village in the administrative district of Gmina Rogowo, within Rypin County, Kuyavian-Pomeranian Voivodeship, in north-central Poland.
