= Wierzchowiska, Kuyavian-Pomeranian Voivodeship =

Wierzchowiska
- Village
- Location within Poland
- Coordinates: 52°57′N 19°26′E
- Country: Poland
- Voivodeship: Kuyavian-Pomeranian
- County: Rypin
- Gmina: Rogowo

Wierzchowiska [vjɛʂxɔˈviska] is a village in the administrative district of Gmina Rogowo, within Rypin County, Kuyavian-Pomeranian Voivodeship, in north-central Poland.
