= Linne, Kuyavian-Pomeranian Voivodeship =

Linne
- Village
- Location within Poland
- Coordinates: 53°5′N 19°30′E
- Country: Poland
- Voivodeship: Kuyavian-Pomeranian
- County: Rypin
- Gmina: Rypin
- Time zone: UTC+1 (CET)
  - Summer (DST): UTC+2 (CEST)
- Vehicle registration: CRY

Linne [ˈlinnɛ] is a village in the administrative district of Gmina Rypin, within Rypin County, Kuyavian-Pomeranian Voivodeship, in north-central Poland.

== History ==
The existence of the village is confirmed as early as 1387.

In 1827, Linne had a population of 169.

During the German occupation of Poland (World War II), in 1941, the German gendarmerie, Einsatzkompanie Thorn and Einsatzkompanie Gotenhafen expelled the entire population of the village, which was placed in a transit camp in Toruń and then deported to Skierniewice in the more south-eastern part of German-occupied Poland.
