= Borowo, Rypin County =

Borowo
- Village
- Location within Poland
- Coordinates: 53°0′N 19°28′E
- Country: Poland
- Voivodeship: Kuyavian-Pomeranian
- County: Rypin
- Gmina: Rogowo

Borowo [bɔˈrɔvɔ] is a village in the administrative district of Gmina Rogowo, within Rypin County, Kuyavian-Pomeranian Voivodeship, in north-central Poland.
