= Radziki Duże =

- Village
- Location within Poland
- Coordinates: 53°10′N 19°17′E
- Country: Poland
- Voivodeship: Kuyavian-Pomeranian
- County: Rypin
- Gmina: Wąpielsk

Radziki Duże [raˈd͡ʑiki ˈduʐɛ] is a village in the administrative district of Gmina Wąpielsk, within Rypin County, Kuyavian-Pomeranian Voivodeship, in north-central Poland.

The village church of St. Catherine, originally a Gothic building of the 14th–15th century, was almost totally rebuilt in 1887. Hence it shows the typical appearance of a Gothic Revival building.

Furthermore Radziki Duże has the medieval (1405–1466) castle of Radzikowski family, although in ruins since 19th century, as well as the Przeciszewski manor house, which now functions as a public school by the name of Zespół Szkolno-Przedszkolny w Radzikach Dużych.
