= Godziszewy =

- Village
- Location within Poland
- Coordinates: 53°4′N 19°29′E
- Country: Poland
- Voivodeship: Kuyavian-Pomeranian
- County: Rypin
- Gmina: Rypin

Godziszewy [ɡɔd͡ʑiˈʂɛvɨ] is a village in the administrative district of Gmina Rypin, within Rypin County, Kuyavian-Pomeranian Voivodeship, in north-central Poland.
