= Nowe Sadłowo =

- Village
- Location within Poland
- Coordinates: 53°04′45″N 19°31′34″E
- Country: Poland
- Voivodeship: Kuyavian-Pomeranian
- County: Rypin
- Gmina: Rypin

Nowe Sadłowo [ˈnɔvɛ sadˈwɔvɔ] is a village in the administrative district of Gmina Rypin, within Rypin County, Kuyavian-Pomeranian Voivodeship, in north-central Poland.

== Administrative division ==
It is part of the Kuyavian-Pomeranian Voivodeship. From 1975 to 1998, the village was administratively part of the Włocławek Voivodeship.

== Demographics ==
According to the National Census (March 2011), the village had a population of 179. It is the nineteenth largest village in the Gmina Rypin.
