= Bielawki, Kuyavian-Pomeranian Voivodeship =

Bielawki
- Village
- Location within Poland
- Coordinates: 53°9′11″N 19°17′11″E
- Country: Poland
- Voivodeship: Kuyavian-Pomeranian
- County: Rypin
- Gmina: Wąpielsk

Bielawki [bjɛˈlafki] is a village in the administrative district of Gmina Wąpielsk, within Rypin County, Kuyavian-Pomeranian Voivodeship, in north-central Poland.
