= Trąbin-Wieś =

- Village
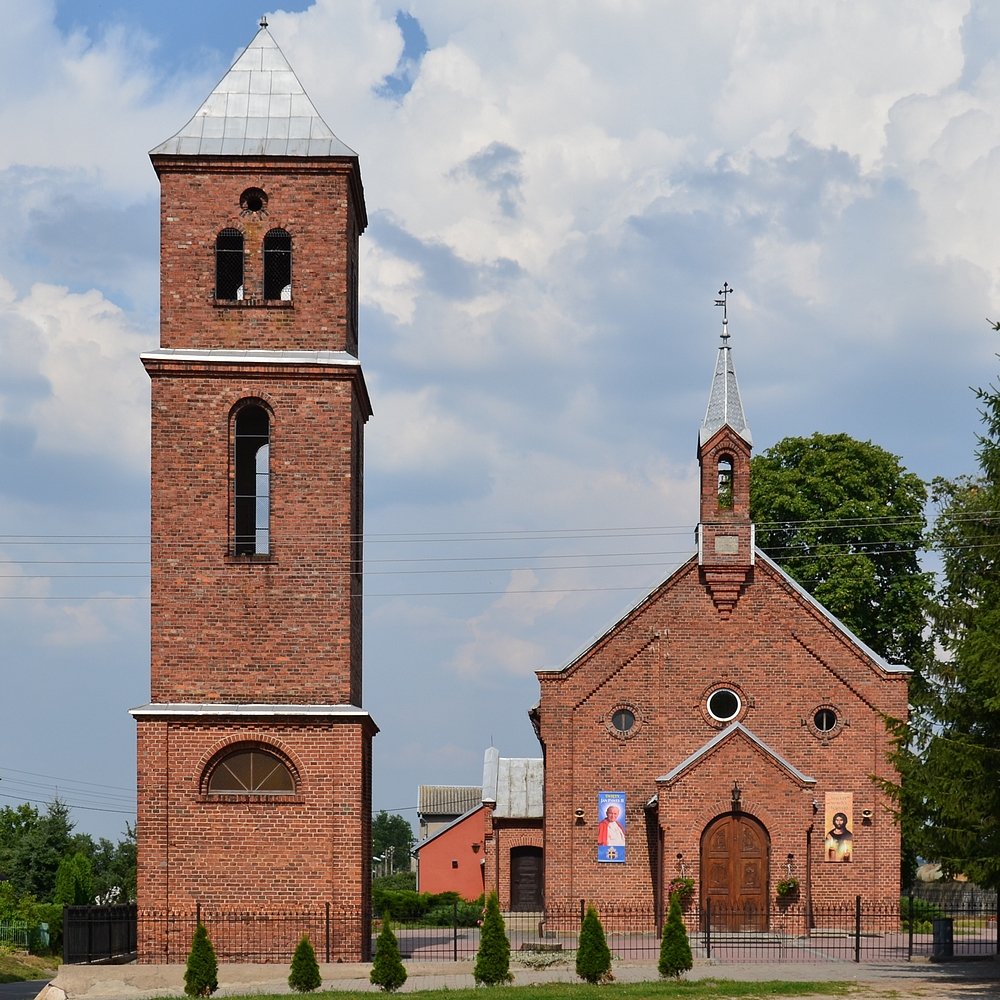

- Location within Poland
- Coordinates: 53°05′34″N 19°16′19″E
- Country: Poland
- Voivodeship: Kuyavian-Pomeranian
- County: Rypin
- Gmina: Brzuze

Trąbin-Wieś [ˈtrɔmbin ˈvjɛɕ] is a village in the administrative district of Gmina Brzuze, within Rypin County, Kuyavian-Pomeranian Voivodeship, in north-central Poland.
