= Sadłowo =

Sadłowo may refer to the following places:

- Sadłowo, Kuyavian-Pomeranian Voivodeship (north-central Poland)
- Sadłowo, Masovian Voivodeship (east-central Poland)
- Sadłowo, Warmian-Masurian Voivodeship (north Poland)
- Sadłowo, West Pomeranian Voivodeship (north-west Poland)
