= Gmina Wąpielsk =

Gmina Wąpielsk Wąpielsk Commune
- Gmina
- Interactive map of Gmina Wąpielsk
- Coordinates (Wąpielsk): 53°8′N 19°17′E
- Country: Poland
- Voivodeship: Kuyavian-Pomeranian
- County: Rypin
- Seat: Wąpielsk

Area
  - Total: 93.78 km^{2} (36.21 sq mi)

Population (2006)
  - Total: 4,164
  - Density: 44.40/km^{2} (115.0/sq mi)

Gmina Wąpielsk is a rural gmina (administrative district) in Rypin County, Kuyavian-Pomeranian Voivodeship, in north-central Poland. Its seat is the village of Wąpielsk, which lies approximately 14 kilometres (9 mi) north-west of Rypin and 46 km (29 mi) east of Toruń.

The gmina covers an area of 93.78 square kilometres (36.2 sq mi), and as of 2006 its total population is 4,164.

== Villages ==
Gmina Wąpielsk contains the villages and settlements of Bielawki, Długie, Kiełpiny, Kierz Półwieski, Kupno, Lamkowizna, Łapinóż-Rumunki, Łapinóżek, Półwiesk Duży, Półwiesk Mały, Radziki Duże, Radziki Małe, Ruszkowo, Tomkowo and Wąpielsk.

== Neighbouring gminas ==
Gmina Wąpielsk is bordered by the gminas of Bobrowo, Brodnica, Brzuze, Golub-Dobrzyń, Osiek, Radomin and Rypin.
