= Gmina Rypin =

Gmina Rypin Rypin Commune
- Gmina
- Flag Coat of arms
- Interactive map of Gmina Rypin
- Coordinates (Rypin): 53°4′N 19°27′E
- Country: Poland
- Voivodeship: Kuyavian-Pomeranian
- County: Rypin
- Seat: Rypin

Area
  - Total: 131.94 km^{2} (50.94 sq mi)

Population (2006)
  - Total: 7,423
  - Density: 56.26/km^{2} (145.7/sq mi)

Gmina Rypin is a rural gmina (administrative district) in Rypin County, Kuyavian-Pomeranian Voivodeship, in north-central Poland. Its seat is the town of Rypin, although the town is not part of the territory of the gmina.

The gmina covers an area of 131.94 square kilometres (50.9 sq mi), and as of 2006 its total population was 7,423.

== Villages ==
Gmina Rypin contains the villages and settlements of Balin, Borzymin, Cetki, Czyżewo, Dębiany, Dylewo, Głowińsk, Godziszewy, Iwany, Jasin, Kowalki, Kwiatkowo, Ławy, Linne, Marianki, Nowe Sadłowo, Podole, Puszcza Miejska, Puszcza Rządowa, Rakowo, Rusinowo, Rypałki Prywatne, Sadłowo, Sadłowo-Rumunki, Sikory, Starorypin, Starorypin Prywatny, Starorypin Rządowy, Stawiska, Stępowo and Zakrocz.

== Neighbouring gminas ==
Gmina Rypin is bordered by the town of Rypin and by the gminas of Brzuze, Osiek, Rogowo, Skrwilno, Świedziebnia and Wąpielsk.
