= Rogowo, Rypin County =

Rogowo
- Village
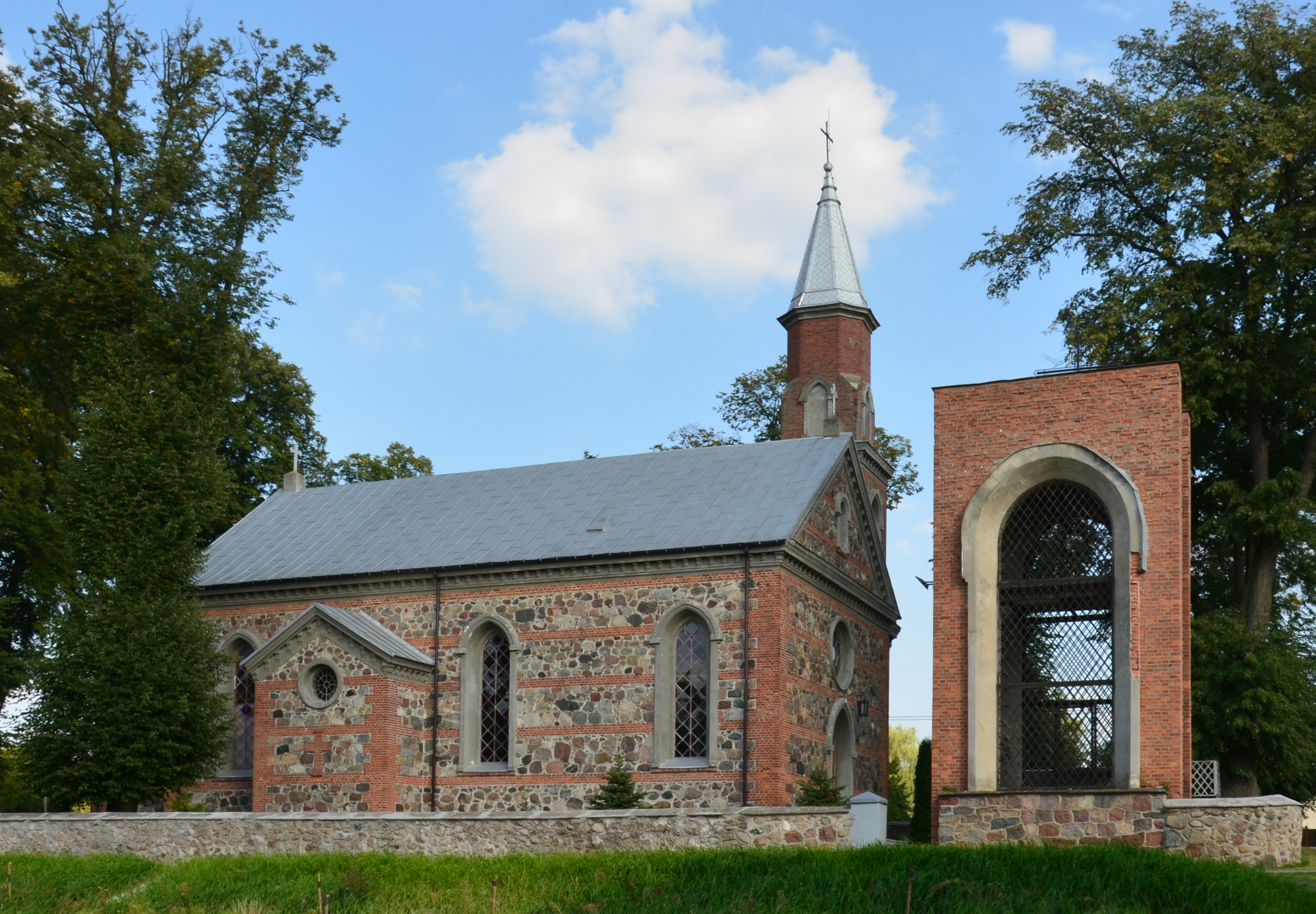

- Location within Poland
- Coordinates: 52°59′N 19°23′E
- Country: Poland
- Voivodeship: Kuyavian-Pomeranian
- County: Rypin
- Gmina: Rogowo
- Website: http://www.rogowo.pl

Rogowo [rɔˈɡɔvɔ] is a village in Rypin County, Kuyavian-Pomeranian Voivodeship, in north-central Poland. It is the seat of the gmina (administrative district) called Gmina Rogowo.
