= Sadłowo, Kuyavian-Pomeranian Voivodeship =

Sadłowo
- Village
- Location within Poland
- Coordinates: 53°5′N 19°31′E
- Country: Poland
- Voivodeship: Kuyavian-Pomeranian
- County: Rypin
- Gmina: Rypin
- Population (approx.): 1,000

Sadłowo [sadˈwɔvɔ] is a village in the administrative district of Gmina Rypin, within Rypin County, Kuyavian-Pomeranian Voivodeship, in north-central Poland.
