= Brzuze =

- Village
- Location within Poland
- Coordinates: 53°2′N 19°19′E
- Country: Poland
- Voivodeship: Kuyavian-Pomeranian
- County: Rypin
- Gmina: Brzuze
- Website: https://www.brzuze.pl

Brzuze [ˈbʐuzɛ] is a village in Rypin County, Kuyavian-Pomeranian Voivodeship, in north-central Poland. It is the seat of the gmina (administrative district) called Gmina Brzuze.
