= Gmina Brzuze =

Gmina Brzuze Brzuze Commune
- Gmina
- Interactive map of Gmina Brzuze
- Coordinates (Brzuze): 53°2′N 19°19′E
- Country: Poland
- Voivodeship: Kuyavian-Pomeranian
- County: Rypin
- Seat: Brzuze

Area
  - Total: 86.25 km^{2} (33.30 sq mi)

Population (2006)
  - Total: 5,368
  - Density: 62.24/km^{2} (161.2/sq mi)
- Website: http://www.brzuze.pl/

Gmina Brzuze is a rural gmina (administrative district) in Rypin County, Kuyavian-Pomeranian Voivodeship, in north-central Poland. Its seat is the village of Brzuze, which lies approximately 10 kilometres (6 mi) south-west of Rypin and 47 km (29 mi) east of Toruń.

The gmina covers an area of 86.25 square kilometres (33.3 sq mi), and as of 2006 its total population is 5,368.

== Villages ==
Gmina Brzuze contains the villages and settlements of Brzuze, Dobre, Giżynek, Gulbiny, Kleszczyn, Łączonek, Marianowo, Mościska, Okonin, Ostrowite, Piskorczyn, Przyrowa, Radzynek, Somsiory, Trąbin-Rumunki, Trąbin-Wieś, Ugoszcz and Żałe.

== Neighbouring gminas ==
Gmina Brzuze is bordered by the gminas of Chrostkowo, Radomin, Rogowo, Rypin, Wąpielsk and Zbójno.
