= Wąpielsk =

- Village
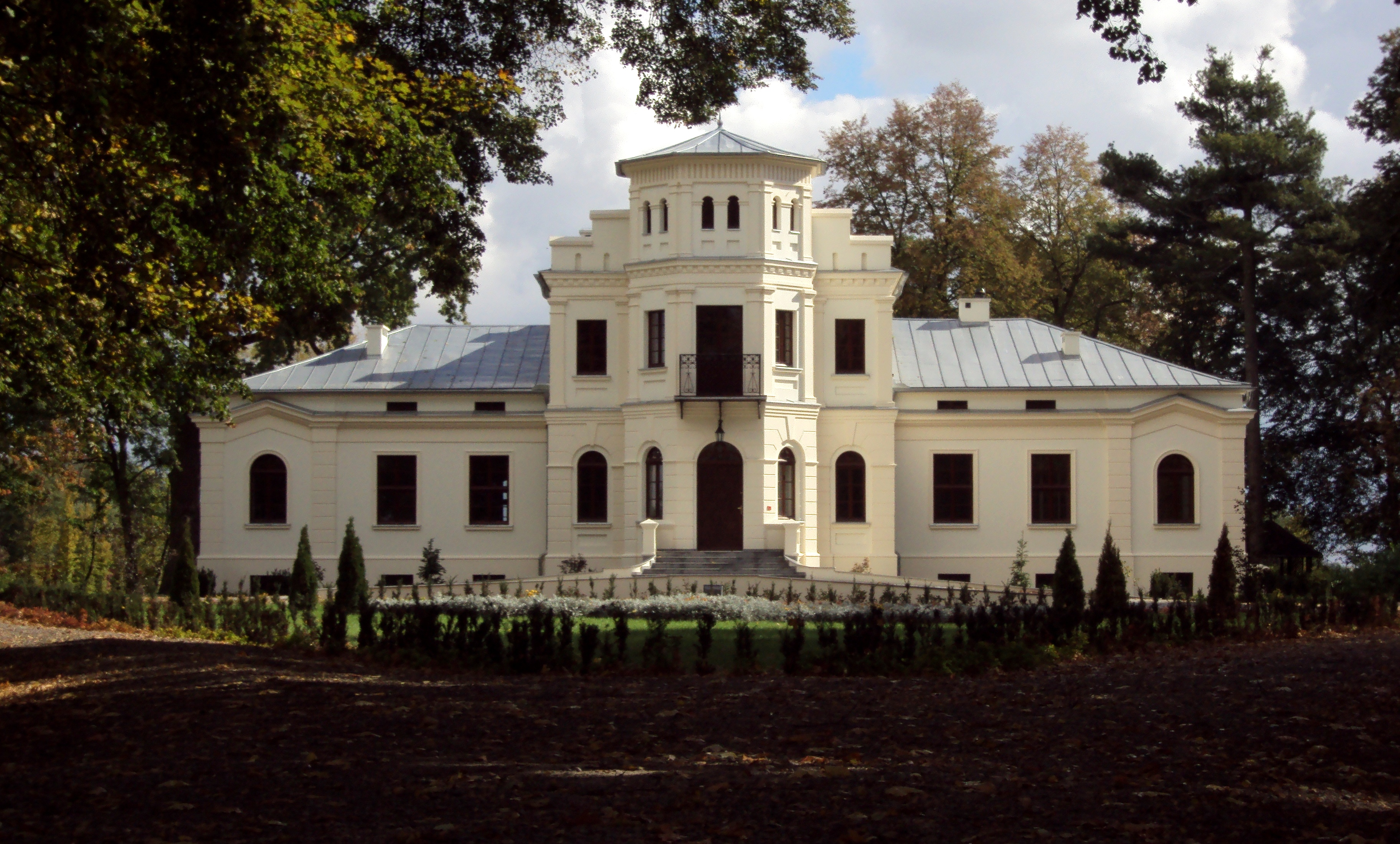
- Siemiątkowski Palace in Wąpielsk

- Location within Poland
- Coordinates: 53°8′N 19°17′E
- Country: Poland
- Voivodeship: Kuyavian-Pomeranian
- County: Rypin
- Gmina: Wąpielsk
- Time zone: UTC+1 (CET)
  - Summer (DST): UTC+2 (CEST)
- Vehicle registration: CRY

Wąpielsk [ˈvɔmpjɛlsk] is a village in Rypin County, Kuyavian-Pomeranian Voivodeship, in north-central Poland. It is the seat of the gmina (administrative district) called Gmina Wąpielsk.

== History ==
In 1827, Wąpielsk had a population of 196.

During the German occupation of Poland (World War II), local teachers were among Polish teachers murdered in Rypin and the Mauthausen concentration camp. In 1941, the German gendarmerie, Einsatzkompanie Thorn and Einsatzkompanie Gotenhafen carried out expulsions of Poles, whose houses and farms were then handed over to German colonists as part of the Lebensraum policy. Expelled Poles were placed in the Potulice concentration camp and then either enslaved as forced labour of new German colonists in the county or deported to the General Government in the more eastern part of German-occupied Poland.
