= Gmina Rogowo, Rypin County =

Gmina Rogowo Rogowo Commune
- Gmina
- Interactive map of Gmina Rogowo
- Coordinates (Rogowo): 52°59′N 19°23′E
- Country: Poland
- Voivodeship: Kuyavian-Pomeranian
- County: Rypin
- Seat: Rogowo

Area
  - Total: 139.8 km^{2} (54.0 sq mi)

Population (2006)
  - Total: 4,677
  - Density: 33.45/km^{2} (86.65/sq mi)
- Website: www.rogowo.pl

Gmina Rogowo is a rural gmina (administrative district) in Rypin County, Kuyavian-Pomeranian Voivodeship, in north-central Poland. Its seat is the village of Rogowo, which lies approximately 11 kilometres (7 mi) south-west of Rypin and 52 km (32 mi) east of Toruń.

The gmina covers an area of 139.8 square kilometres (54.0 sq mi), and as of 2006 its total population is 4,677.

== Villages ==
Gmina Rogowo contains the villages and settlements of Borowo, Brzeszczki Duże, Brzeszczki Małe, Charszewo, Czumsk Duży, Czumsk Mały, Huta, Huta-Chojno, Karbowizna, Kosiory, Lasoty, Lisiny, Nadróż, Narty, Nowy Kobrzyniec, Pinino, Pręczki, Rogówko, Rogowo, Rojewo, Ruda, Rumunki Likieckie, Sosnowo, Stary Kobrzyniec, Świeżawy, Szczerby and Wierzchowiska.

== Neighbouring gminas ==
Gmina Rogowo is bordered by the gminas of Brzuze, Chrostkowo, Rypin, Skępe, Skrwilno and Szczutowo.
