= Głowiński monoplane =

Un-named monoplane

General information
- Type: Experimental aircraft
- National origin: Poland
- Manufacturer: Bronisław Głowiński
- Designer: Bronisław Głowiński
- Number built: 1

History
- First flight: May 1911

The so-called Głowiński monoplane was an otherwise unnamed aircraft built by Bronisław Głowiński in Poland in 1911, and which became the first aircraft built on Polish territory to fly. Głowiński was a student of an Engineering School in Lwów, and he built his plane in his brother's workshop in Ternopil (then: Polish city under Austrian rule). Modelled superficially after the French Blériot XI, Głowiński's design differed from that aircraft most significantly in using a frame of welded steel tube rather than wood, and that an engine was mounted higher. Like the Blériot (and most other designs of the era), the fuselage was left uncovered as an open framework. Although Głowiński managed to make a number of short flights in the machine from May to summer 1911, it was too heavy for the powerplant selected, which itself was worn out, and development was soon abandoned. By 1913, Głowiński had broken up his plane. Parts of the aircraft survived until World War II.

== Specifications ==
General characteristics

- Crew: One pilot
- Length: 8.00 m (26 ft 3 in)
- Wingspan: 10.20 m (33 ft 6 in)
- Height: 2.5 m (8 ft 2 in)
- Wing area: 18.5 m^{2} (200 sq ft)
- Empty weight: 320 kg (700 lb)
- Gross weight: 400 kg (880 lb)
- Powerplant: 1 × Anzani 3-cylinder fan engine , 19 kW (25 hp)

Performance

- Maximum speed: 60 km/h (40 mph, 35 kn)
- Range: 25 km (15 mi, 13 nmi)
