= Rypin County =

Rypin County Powiat rypiński
- County
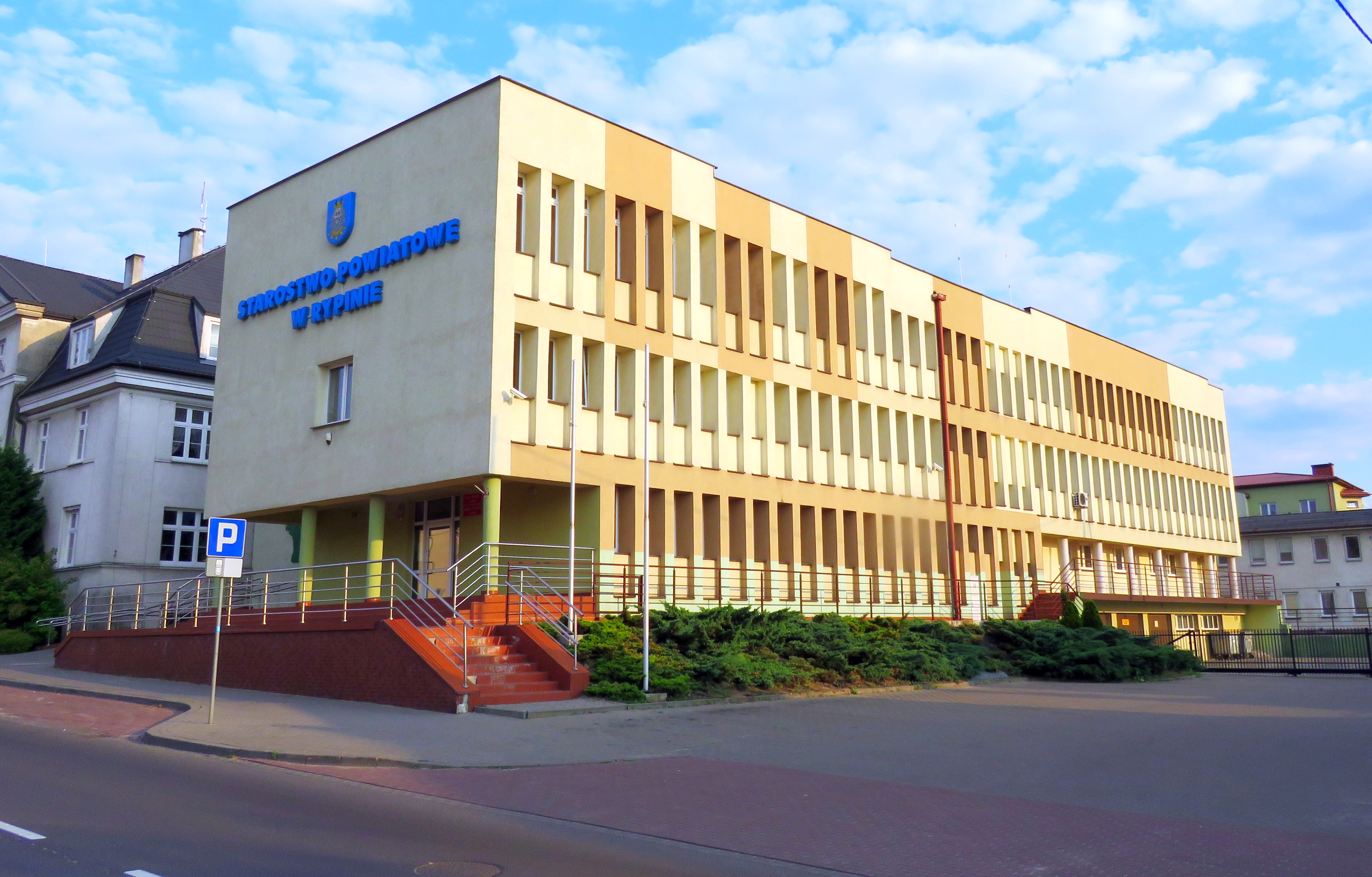

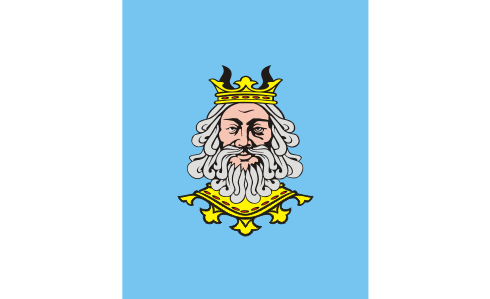
- Flag Coat of arms

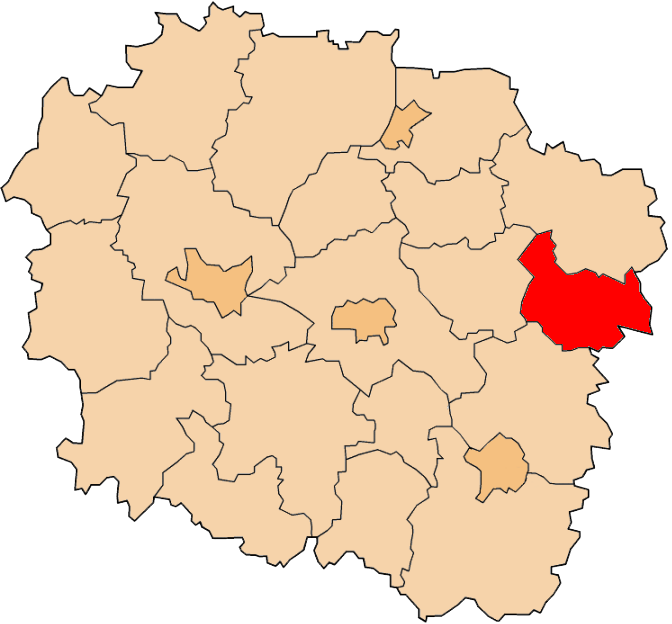
- Location within the voivodeship

- Division into gminas
- Coordinates (Rypin): 53°4′N 19°27′E
- Country: Poland
- Voivodeship: Kuyavian-Pomeranian
- Seat: Rypin
- Gminas: Total 6 (incl. 1 urban): Rypin; Gmina Brzuze; Gmina Rogowo; Gmina Rypin; Gmina Skrwilno; Gmina Wąpielsk

Government
  - Starosta: Jarosław Sochacki (PiS)

Area
  - Total: 587.08 km^{2} (226.67 sq mi)

Population (2019)
  - Total: 43,618
  - Density: 74.297/km^{2} (192.43/sq mi)
  - Urban: 16,227
  - Rural: 27,391
- Car plates: CRY
- Website: powiatrypinski.pl

Rypin County (Polish: powiat rypiński) is a unit of territorial administration and local government (powiat) in Kuyavian-Pomeranian Voivodeship, north-central Poland. It came into being on January 1, 1999, as a result of the Polish local government reforms passed in 1998. Its administrative seat and only town is Rypin, which lies 56 km (35 mi) east of Toruń and 98 km (61 mi) east of Bydgoszcz.

The county covers an area of 587.08 square kilometres (226.7 sq mi). As of 2019 its total population is 43,618, out of which the population of Rypin is 16,227 and the rural population is 27,391.

== Neighbouring counties ==
Rypin County is bordered by Brodnica County to the north, Żuromin County to the east, Sierpc County to the south-east, Lipno County to the south-west and Golub-Dobrzyń County to the west.

== Administrative divisions ==
The county is subdivided into six gminas (one urban and five rural). These are listed in the following table, in descending order of population.

| Gmina | Type | Area (km^{2}) | Population (2019) | Seat |
|---|---|---|---|---|
| Rypin | urban | 11.0 | 16,227 | |
| Gmina Rypin | rural | 131.9 | 7,498 | Rypin * |
| Gmina Skrwilno | rural | 124.4 | 5,872 | Skrwilno |
| Gmina Brzuze | rural | 86.3 | 5,308 | Brzuze |
| Gmina Rogowo | rural | 139.8 | 4,729 | Rogowo |
| Gmina Wąpielsk | rural | 93.8 | 3,984 | Wąpielsk |
* seat not part of the gmina
