= A1 autostrada (Poland) =

North–south motorway in Poland

Autostrada A1
- Autostrada Bursztynowa

Route information
- Part of E75
- Length: 566.6 km (352.1 mi)

Major junctions
- From: S6 near Gdańsk
- S5 near Grudziądz S10 near Toruń; A2 near Stryków; S8 near Tuszyn; S8 and S12 (planned) near Piotrków Trybunalski; S1 near Katowice International Airport in Pyrzowice; S11 near Tarnowskie Góry (planned) A4 near Gliwice
- To: D1 border with Czech Republic

Location
- Country: Poland
- Major cities: Gdańsk, Grudziądz, Toruń, Łódź, Piotrków Trybunalski, Częstochowa, Gliwice

Highway system
- National roads in Poland; Voivodeship roads
← A 50	→ A 2

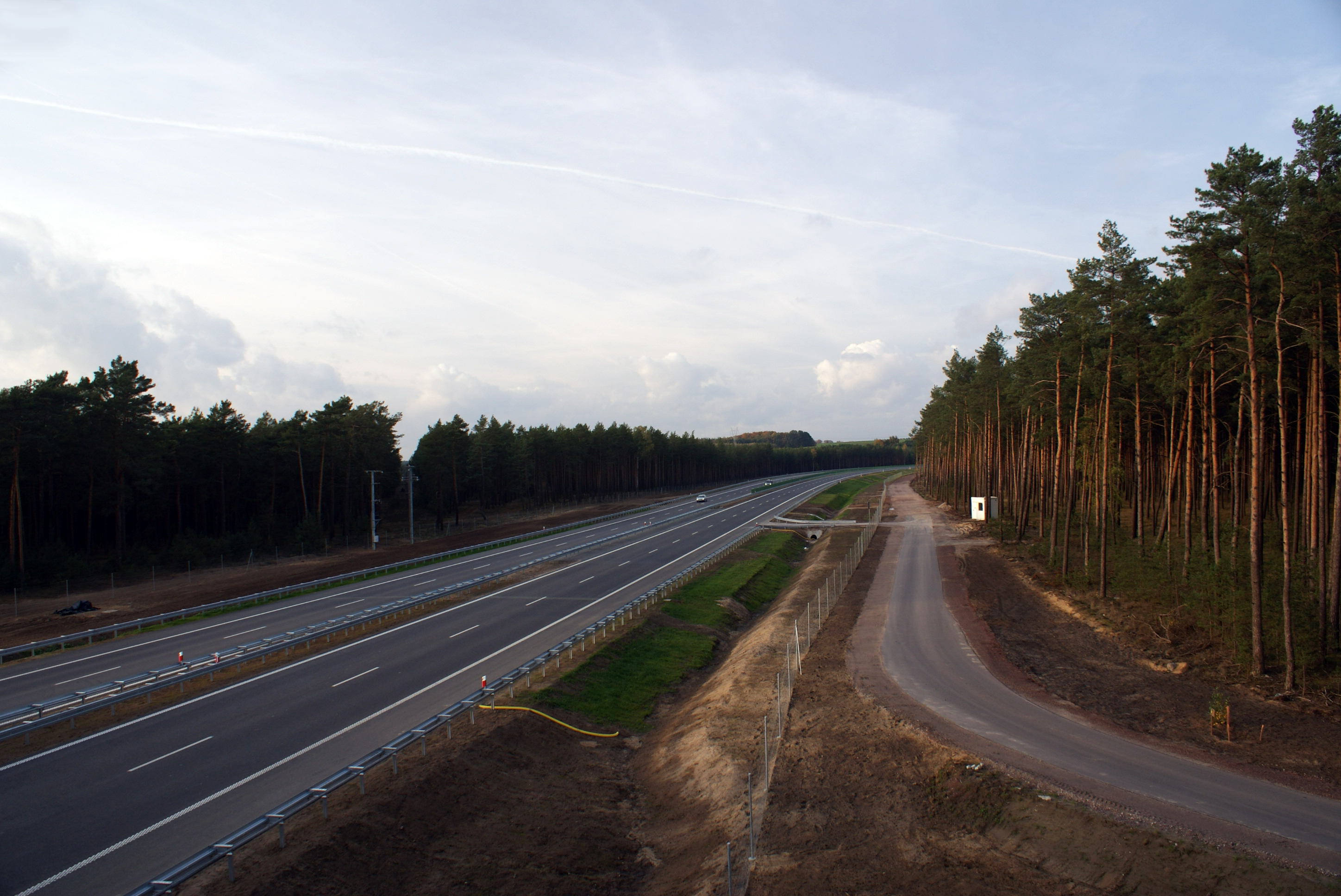
A1 near Grudziądz, northern (Gdańsk - Grudziądz) section.

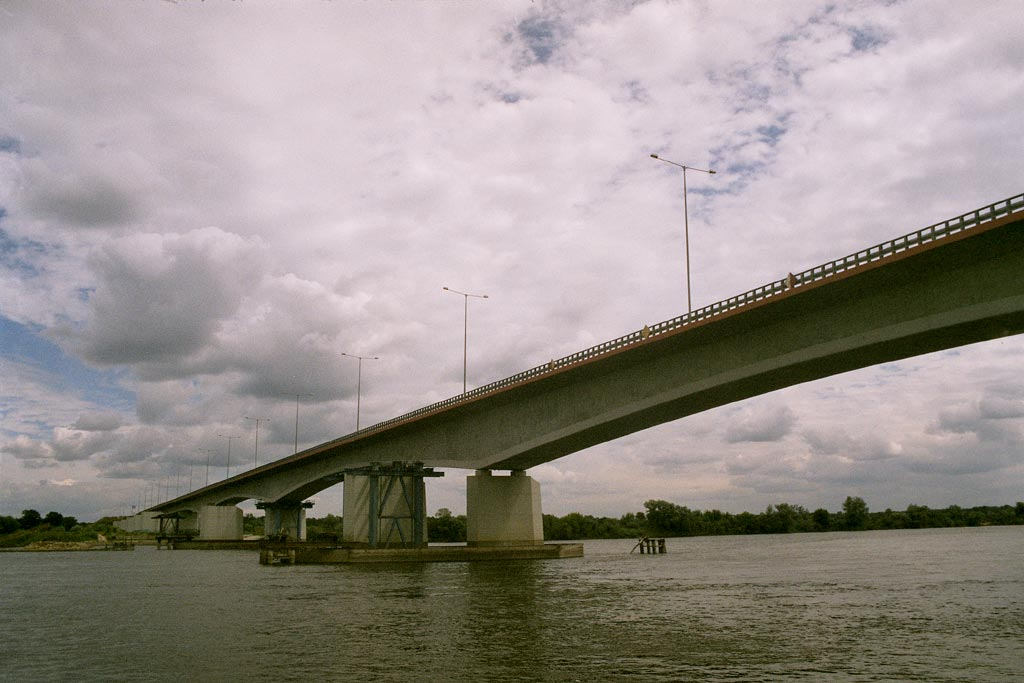
2005 photo of partially completed bridge over the Vistula river in Toruń-Czerniewice on the Torun bypass, with only one carriageway finished and pillars for the planned second one. The bridge was opened with dual carriageways in fall of 2011 and became part of A1.

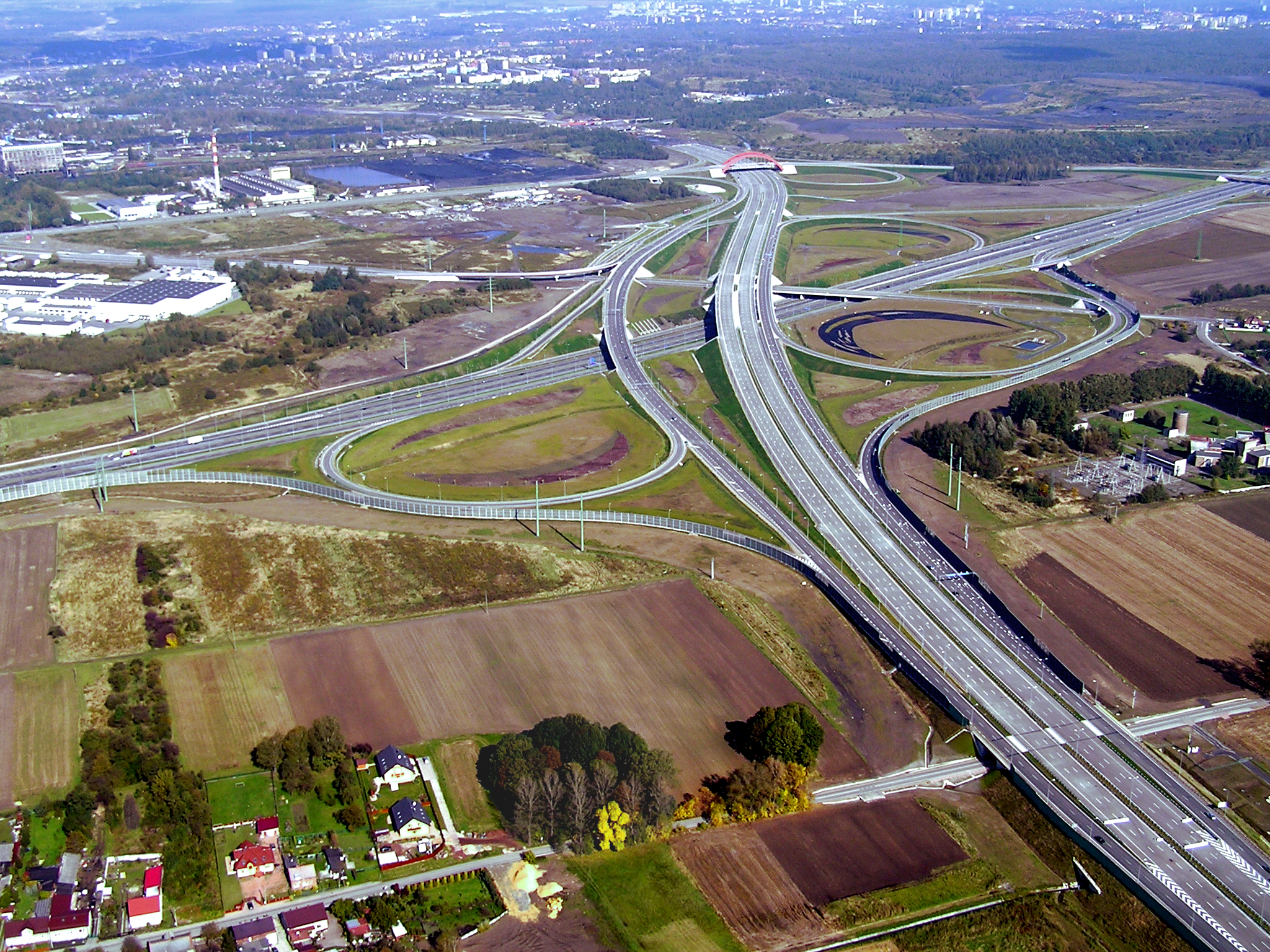
Southern part of the Gliwice-Sośnica interchange of A1 motorway, A4 motorway, national road 44 and voivodeship road 902, the largest motorway junction in Europe, opened 2009-2010

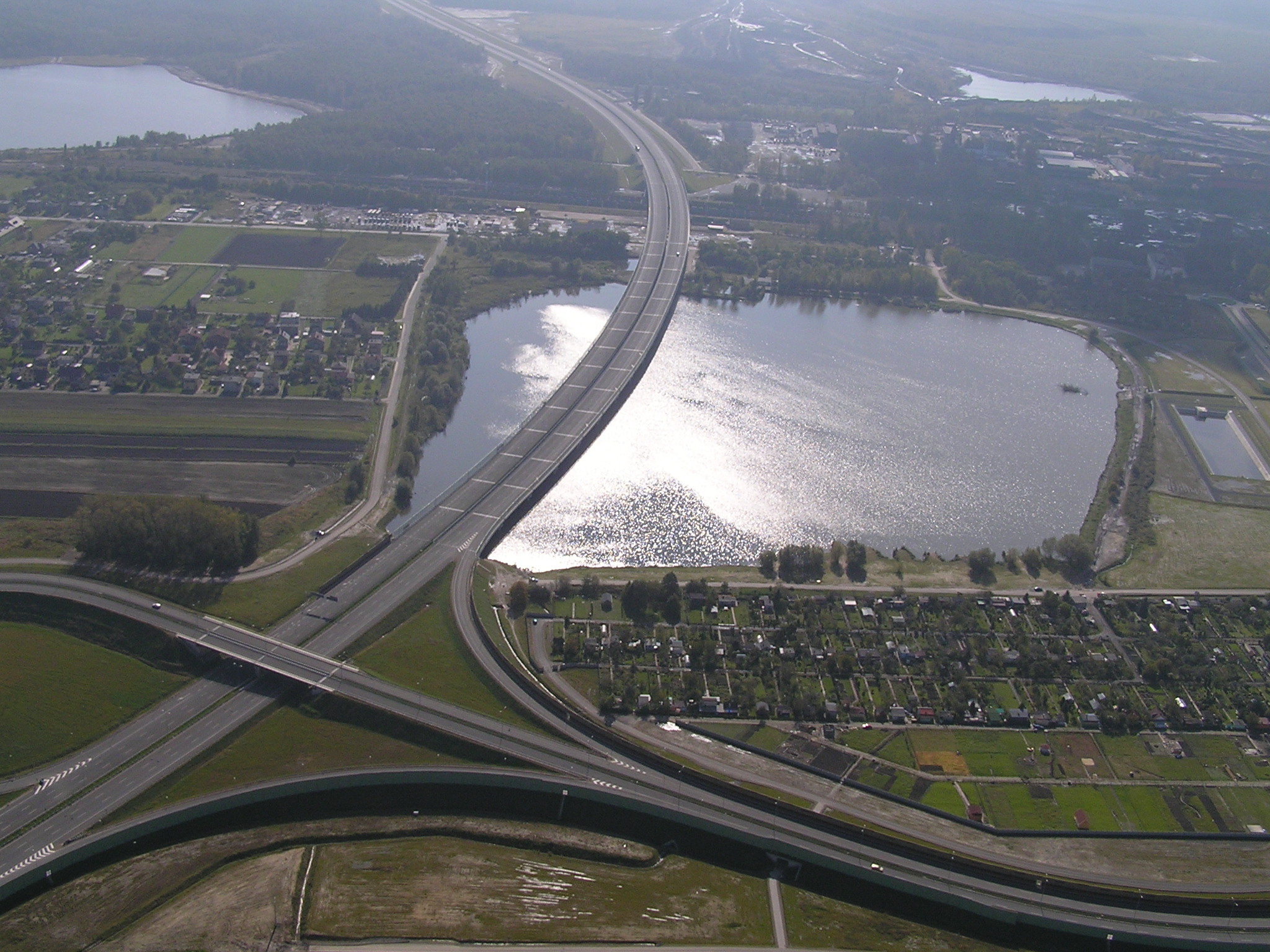
800 meter bridge in Knurow near Gliwice

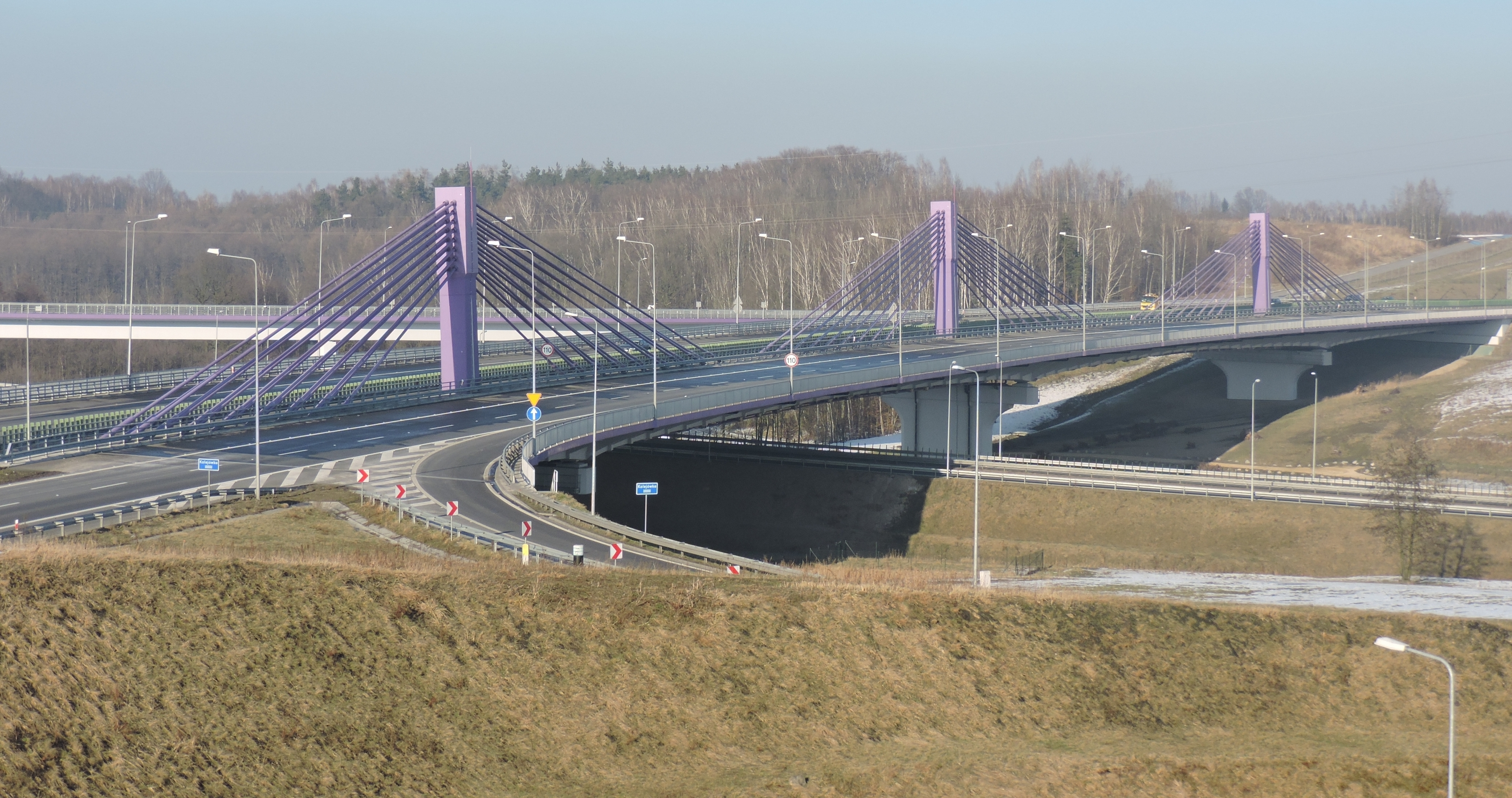
400 meter bridge in Mszana near Wodzisław Śląski

The autostrada A1, officially named Amber Highway (Polish: Autostrada Bursztynowa) is a north–south motorway in Poland that runs from Gdańsk on the Baltic Sea, through Łódź and the Upper Silesian Industry Area (to the west of Katowice), to the Polish-Czech border in Gorzyczki/Věřňovice, where it connects with the motorway D1. Its total length is 566.6 km (352.1 mi). Except for its southernmost section, A1 is a part of European route E75.

The motorway was constructed between 2005 and 2022. The section from Gdańsk to Toruń is tolled (see Tolls).

== History of construction ==
The construction of the A1 motorway has been a highly politicized issue in Poland, as it is perceived to be an economically vital road that would connect the country's major ports on the Baltic coast with both central and southern Poland. One short fragment (17 km) was constructed in years 1978 – 1989, one of the first motorway stretches built under communist regime. Since 1989 various governments and political parties have supported an accelerated construction schedule for this motorway, without results.

After many delays, caused mainly by lack of funding, construction started in 2005. The main part of the motorway was constructed in years 2005 – 2014: about 395 km (70% of the route's length) have been built within this period. By July 2016 (when a delayed Łódź bypass section was finished), the route has been completed except for those sections where the old national road 1 had already been a dual carriageway, allowing for a significantly lower priority of constructing a motorway on this remaining stretch compared to construction of other highways.

The section from Częstochowa to Pyrzowice was constructed in years 2016 – 2020. The remaining section from Tuszyn to Częstochowa was constructed in years 2019 – 2022, which also included an upgrade of the 17 km long pre-1989 stretch.

=== Gdańsk to Stryków ===
This section was built in stages between 2005 and 2014. First, a 25 km (16 mi) section was opened on 22 December 2007, near Gdańsk, extending the S6 bypass expressway, and a remaining 65 km (40 mi) opened on 17 October 2008. The 62 km extension of the motorway to Toruń opened on 14 October 2011. In November 2012 a 75 km (47 mi) long section from Kowal to Łódź Północ interchange in Stryków was opened, followed by 45 km (28 mi) extension from Toruń to Włocławek in December 2013. Missing Włocławek-Kowal section was completed in April 2014.

=== Stryków to Pyrzowice ===
The oldest section of this segment, a 17.5 km (11 mi) stretch as the Piotrków Trybunalski bypass, was built between 1978 and 1989. This was one of the very few stretches of motorway built in Poland under the Communist regime. In addition, the section from Częstochowa to Piotrków Trybunalski was built in the 1970s as a dual carriageway road on a motorway alignment. However, it lacked motorway interchanges, and instead had standard intersections with no grade separation, regulated by traffic lights.

On 22 January 2009 a contract was signed for the construction of the 180 km (110 mi) section from Stryków (junction with motorway A2) to Pyrzowice. Under the terms of the contract, the segment from Stryków to Częstochowa (123 km (76 mi)) was to be finished by May 2012, while the remaining segment from Częstochowa to Pyrzowice (57 km (35 mi)) was to be finished by January 2014 (60 months after the signing of the contract). The motorway was to be built within a Private-Public Partnership framework by company Autostrada Południe. The contract included the rebuilding of an already existing stretch of A1 motorway (opened in 1989) as well as the upgrade of the existing dual-carriageway road between Piotrków Trybunalski and Częstochowa. On 23 January 2010 the contract was cancelled as the company was not able to secure financing. It carried out the design project of the motorway however, which according to the Polish government was to make it possible for construction to begin in 2010 by new contractors, and be finished by 2012. However, the design project turned out to be full of flaws and needed to be redone.

The section from Łódź Północ interchange to Tuszyn interchange was opened in 2016. The section from Pyrzowice to Częstochowa began construction in 2016, and was finished in 2020. Reconstruction of the remaining dual-carriageway stretch from Częstochowa to Piotrków Trybunalski began in 2019 and finished in 2022.

=== Pyrzowice to border with Czech Republic ===
At the southern end of the motorway, construction of a 15.5 km (9.6 mi) section from Gliwice-Sośnica to Bełk, part of the southernmost section from the junction with the A4 motorway at Sośnica district of Gliwice to the Czech border, began on 26 March 2007 and was completed in December 2009. The remainder of the 48 km (30 mi) long section from A4 to the border was opened in different stages from 2009 till 2014. Construction of the 43 km (27 mi) section from Pyrzowice to Gliwice-Sośnica began in 2009 and was fully completed by June 2012. The section from Pyrzowice to Piekary Śląskie has quickly deteriorated into very poor condition due to the materials used for its foundation, and is planned to be repaired.

On 15 December 2009 the Polish government announced the cancelling of the contract for building the Świerklany - Gorzyczki (Czech border) section, citing the unacceptably slow pace of construction by Alpine Bau GmbH. The government solicited new bids for this section in April 2010 and the bid was won by the same company that lost the original contract, and construction resumed in October 2010. The original plan was for the road to be ready in the Summer of 2010, and according to the new contract it was to be ready in April 2012, in time for Euro 2012 championships. Alpine Bau GmbH abandoned their second effort to finish this section in May 2013. It was finally opened in May 2014.

== Sections of the motorway ==
Motorway section	Length	Constructed	Note
Gdańsk - Grudziądz	90 km	2005 – 2008	Opened October 17, 2008; toll motorway.
Grudziądz - Toruń	62 km	2008 – 2011	Opened October 14, 2011; toll motorway.
Toruń - Kowal	64 km	2010 – 2014	Construction interrupted in September 2012, as companies involved have been ejected from the contract. (the ejected companies have sued the Polish authorities). New contractors have been selected in April 2013 and the road opened to traffic in December 2013 (45 km) and April 2014 (19 km).
Kowal - Łódź Północ	75 km	2010 – 2012	Opened November 13, 2012.
Łódź bypass (Stryków - Tuszyn)	37.3 km	2012 – 2016	Design-build contract signed in December 2010, completion originally planned in 32 months, then delayed to June 2014, then later plans had it completed in Summer of 2015. However, the contractor abandoned the contract in January 2014. New contractors have been appointed fall 2014. Opened July 2016.
Tuszyn - Piotrków Trybunalski	16 km	1978 – 1989; 2019 – 2021	Reconstructed and widened to 3 lanes per direction in years 2019 – 2021.
Piotrków Tryb. - Kamieńsk	24 km	2019 – 2022	3 lanes per direction. Built by reconstructing a national road from the 1970s with 2 lanes per direction.
Kamieńsk - Częstochowa	41 km	2019 – 2021	3 lanes per direction. Built by reconstructing a national road from the 1970s with 2 lanes per direction.
Częstochowa bypass	20.3 km	2015 – 2019	Contract signed in October 2015. In April 2019, Salini Impregilo was ejected from the contract for extensive delays. In August 2019, completion of the section was awarded to Budimex, Strabag and Bud-Pol. The section was opened to traffic on 23 December 2019, while the construction works continued till June 2020.
Częstochowa - Pyrzowice	36.6 km	2015 – 2019	Opened 2 August 2019. The fragment from "Częstochowa Blachownia" to "Częstochowa Południe" remained closed to traffic until 23 December 2019, when the adjacent section was opened.
Pyrzowice - "Zabrze Północ”	31 km	2009 – 2012	Opened 1 June 2012.
"Zabrze Północ” - "Gliwice Sośnica"	14.1 km	2009 – 2011	Opened in September / December 2011. 3 lanes per direction.
"Gliwice Sośnica" - Bełk	15.5 km	2007 – 2009	Opened in December 2009. 3 lanes per direction.
Bełk - Świerklany	14.1 km	2008 – 2011	Bełk - Rowień opened in December 2010. 3 lanes per direction. Rowień - Świerklany opened in April 2011 (delayed because of floods).
Świerklany - Gorzyczki (Czech border)	18.4 km	2007 – (2012 / ) 2014	Construction interrupted in late 2009 due to contract dispute, then resumed in October 2010. Was to be opened in July 2012, but a problem with one of the bridges then moved the planned opening until August, 2013. Section Mszana - Gorzyczki was opened in November 2012, but only light vehicles were allowed to use it until completion of the remaining fragment. In May, 2013 the contractor abandoned the project, citing disagreement with Polish government agencies. A new contractor to finish the bridge was selected in June 2013, and the road fully opened to traffic on May 23, 2014.

== Exit list ==
Country	Voivodeship	Location	km	mi	Exit	Name	Destinations	Notes
Poland	Pomeranian Voivodeship	Rusocin, Pomeranian Voivodeship	1.2	0.75	—	Rusocin	DK 6 / E28 / E75 – Gdańsk, Gdynia, Szczecin / Pruszcz Gdański DW 226 – Nowa Karczma, Kościerzyna	Actual terminus of A1 is placed north from this exit – road continues as expressway S6; north end of E 75 overlap
Poland	Pomeranian Voivodeship	Stanisławie	17.2	10.7	—	Stanisławie	DW 224 – Tczew / Kościerzyna	Toll junction
Poland	Pomeranian Voivodeship	Swarożyn	25.5	15.8	—	Swarożyn	DK 22 – Malbork / Człuchów	Toll junction
Poland	Pomeranian Voivodeship	Ropuchy	36.9	22.9	—	Pelplin	DW 229 – Pelplin / Starogard Gdański	Toll junction
Poland	Pomeranian Voivodeship	Kopytkowo, Pomeranian Voivodeship	59.2	36.8	—	Kopytkowo	DW 231 – Skórcz / Kwidzyn	Toll junction
Poland	Kuyavian-Pomeranian Voivodeship	Płochocinek	74.2	46.1	—	Warlubie	DW 214 – Warlubie / Kościerzyna	Toll junction
Poland	Kuyavian-Pomeranian Voivodeship	Nowe Marzy	89.6	55.7	—	Nowe Marzy	S 5 (under construction) DK 5 / E261 – Świecie, Bydgoszcz, Poznań; DK 91 – Świecie, Toruń, Łódź / Tczew, Pruszcz Gdański, Gdańsk	Toll junction
Poland	Kuyavian-Pomeranian Voivodeship	Pieńki Królewskie	97.3	60.5	—	Grudziądz	DK 95 Grudziądz; DK 55 Malbork, Nowy Dwór Gdański, Toruń/Stolno (Diagonal route)	Toll junction; access through unsigned national road 95
Poland	Kuyavian-Pomeranian Voivodeship	Lisewo	113.1	70.3	—	Lisewo	DW 548 – Stolno / Wąbrzeźno	Toll junction
Poland	Kuyavian-Pomeranian Voivodeship	Rogowo, Toruń County	135.7	84.3	—	Turzno	DK 15 – Olsztyn / Toruń	Toll junction; access through partially signed national road 96
Poland	Kuyavian-Pomeranian Voivodeship	Lubicz Dolny	142	88	—	Lubicz	DK 10 – Warszawa; DK 80 – Toruń	Toll junction; north-east end of S10 overlap
Poland	Kuyavian-Pomeranian Voivodeship	Brzoza, Toruń County	152.4	94.7	12	Toruń Południe	S 10 – Toruń, Bydgoszcz	South-west end of S10 overlap; exit number as part of "experimental signage"
Poland	Kuyavian-Pomeranian Voivodeship	Odolion			13	Ciechocinek	DW 266 – Aleksandrów Kujawski / Ciechocinek	Access to national road 91 through road 266 in direction of Ciechocinek; exit number as part of "experimental signage"
Poland	Kuyavian-Pomeranian Voivodeship	Brzezie, Kuyavian-Pomeranian Voivodeship	187.9	116.8	14	Włocławek Północ	DW 252 – Inowrocław / Włocławek	Exit number as part of "experimental signage"
Poland	Kuyavian-Pomeranian Voivodeship	Pikutkowo	196.5	122.1	15	Włocławek Zachód	DK 62 – Poznań / Włocławek	Exit number as part of "experimental signage"
Poland	Kuyavian-Pomeranian Voivodeship	Dąbrówka, Gmina Kowal	216.2	134.3	16	Kowal	DK 91 – Łódź / Włocławek	Exit number as part of "experimental signage"
Poland	Łódź Voivodeship	Sójki	244.7	152.0	—	Kutno Północ	DK 60 – Płock / Kutno	
Poland	Łódź Voivodeship	Sokół, Łódź Voivodeship	253.7	157.6	—	Kutno Wschód	DK 92 – Kutno / Warszawa	
Poland	Łódź Voivodeship	Broników, Łęczyca County	272.7	169.4	—	Piątek	DW 703 – Łęczyca / Łowicz	
Poland	Łódź Voivodeship	Stryków	293.8	182.6	20	Łódź Północ interchange	A 2 / E30 – Warszawa / Poznań, Łódź, Łódź Airport	Exit number as part of "experimental signage"; part of Łódź Ring Road
Poland	Łódź Voivodeship	Natolin, Łódź Voivodeship	305.5	189.8	21	Brzeziny	DK 72 – Łódź-Bałuty / Rawa Mazowiecka	Bałuty is a former dzielnica of Łódź, abolished in 1993; part of Łódź Ring Road; eit number as part of "experimental signage"
Poland	Łódź Voivodeship	Łódź	311.5	193.6	22	Łódź Wschód	DW 713 – Łódź-Centrum, Łódź Airport / Tomaszów Mazowiecki	Centrum means centre; exit number as part of "experimental signage"; part of Łódź Ring Road
Poland	Łódź Voivodeship	Wola Rakowa	319.7	198.7	23	Łódź Górna	DW 714 – Łódź-Górna; / Tomaszów Mazowiecki	Górna is a former dzielnica of Łódź, abolished in 1993; exit number as part of "experimental signage"; part of Łódź Ring Road
Poland	Łódź Voivodeship	Modlica, Łódź Voivodeship	323.9	201.3	24	Łódź Południe	S 8 / E67 – Wrocław; DK 91 – Łódź, Łódź Airport	Exit number as part of "experimental signage"; part of Łódź Ring Road; north-west end of S8 and E 67 overlap; access to national road 91 through S8
Poland	Łódź Voivodeship	Gołygów Drugi	334.5	207.8	25	Tuszyn	DK 12 – Sieradz / Piotrków Trybunalski; DK 91 – Łódź; / Piotrków Trybunalski	• Incomplete junction: no exit ramp Katowice → Piotrków Trybunalski; no entry ramp Piotrków Trybunalski → Katowice • Exit numbering: in direction of Katowice exit ramp towards Łódź signed with number 25A, exit ramp towards Piotrków Trybunalski signed with number 25B; in direction of Łódź exit signed with number 25 Exit numbering as part of "experimental signage"
Poland	Łódź Voivodeship	Piotrków Trybunalski	347.6	216.0	26	Piotrków Trybunalski Zachód	S 8 / E67 – Warszawa, Tomaszów Mazowiecki; DK 74 – Kielce	South-east end of S8 and E 67 overlap; north-east end of DK 74 overlap; exit number as part of "experimental signage"
Poland	Łódź Voivodeship	Piotrków Trybunalski	350.5	217.8	27	Piotrków Trybunalski Południe	DK 74 – Bełchatów local road to Piotrków Trybunalski	South-west end of DK 74 overlap; exit number as part of "experimental signage"
Poland	Łódź Voivodeship	Kamieńsk	375.5	233.3	28	Kamieńsk	DW 484 – Bełchatów / Kamieńsk	Roadworks on the junction as part of upgrading Piotrków Trybunalski–Częstochowa section of national road 1 to motorway; exit number as part of "experimental signage"; access to national road 91 through road 484 in direction of Kamieńsk
Poland	Łódź Voivodeship	Radomsko	391.2	243.1	(29)	Radomsko	DK 42 – Radomsko / Kluczbork	Access to national road 42 through local road; unsigned exit number
Poland	Silesian Voivodeship	Mykanów	462	287	30	Mykanów	local road	Exit number as part of "experimental signage"
Poland	Silesian Voivodeship	Rząsawy	418.9	260.3	31	Częstochowa Północ	DK 91 – Częstochowa, Katowice	Access to national road 91 through local road; exit number as part of "experimental signage"
Poland	Silesian Voivodeship	Lgota, Silesian Voivodeship	428.8	266.4	32	Częstochowa Jasna Góra	DK 43 – Częstochowa / Wieluń	Exit number as part of "experimental signage"
Poland	Silesian Voivodeship	Wyrazów	437.1	271.6	33	Częstochowa Blachownia	DK 46 – Częstochowa / Opole	Exit number as part of "experimental signage"
Poland	Silesian Voivodeship	Wygoda, Silesian Voivodeship	441.9	274.6	34	Częstochowa Południe	DW 908 – Częstochowa / Tarnowskie Góry	Exit number as part of "experimental signage"
Poland	Silesian Voivodeship	Woźniki	458.6	285.0	35	Woźniki	DW 789 – Kalety / Woźniki, Koziegłowy	Exit number as part of "experimental signage"
Poland	Silesian Voivodeship	Celiny, Tarnowskie Góry County	475.3	295.3	(36)	Pyrzowice	S 1 / E75 – Bielsko-Biała, Zwardoń, Cieszyn, Katowice, Katowice Airport	South end of E 75 overlap; exit number not signed
Poland	Silesian Voivodeship	Piekary Śląskie			—	Piekary Śląskie	local road to Piekary Śląskie-Centrum; DW 911 – Świerklaniec / Bytom	Centrum means centre; unknown kilometrage – distance markers show distance of local section
Poland	Silesian Voivodeship	Bytom			—	Bytom	local road to Bytom; DK 11 – Tarnowskie Góry / Poznań	Unknown kilometrage – distance markers show distance of local section
Poland	Silesian Voivodeship	Zabrze			—	Zabrze Północ	DK 78 – Tarnowskie Góry / Gliwice; DK 94 – Bytom / Opole	Unknown kilometrage – distance markers show distance of local section; access to national road 94 through road 78
Poland	Silesian Voivodeship	Czekanów, Silesian Voivodeship			—	Zabrze Zachód	DK 78 – Tarnowskie Góry / Gliwice	Unknown kilometrage – distance markers show distance of local section
Poland	Silesian Voivodeship	Gliwice			—	Gliwice Wschód	DK 88 – Strzelce Opolskie, Gliwice / Bytom, Zabrze	Unknown kilometrage – distance markers show distance of local section
Poland	Silesian Voivodeship	Gliwice			—	Gliwice Sośnica interchange	A 4 / E40 – Katowice / Wrocław; DK 44 – Tychy DW 902 – Katowice / Gliwice-Centrum	Centrum means centre; unknown kilometrage – distance markers show distance of local sections
Poland	Silesian Voivodeship	Knurów			—	Knurów	DW 921 – Gierałtowice / Knurów	Unknown kilometrage – distance markers show distance of local section
Poland	Silesian Voivodeship	Dębieńsko			—	Dębieńsko	local road – Orzesze / Czerwionka-Leszczyny	Unknown kilometrage – distance markers show distance of local section
Poland	Silesian Voivodeship	Bełk, Silesian Voivodeship			—	Rybnik	DW 925 – Ruda Śląska / Rybnik	Unknown kilometrage – distance markers show distance of local section
Poland	Silesian Voivodeship	Żory			—	Żory	DW 935 – Pszczyna, Żory / Rybnik	Unknown kilometrage – distance markers show distance of local section
Poland	Silesian Voivodeship	Świerklany			—	Świerklany	DW 932 – Żory / Wodzisław Śląski	Unknown kilometrage – distance markers show distance of local section
Poland	Silesian Voivodeship	Mszana			—	Mszana	DW 933 – Wodzisław Śląski / Jastrzębie-Zdrój	Unknown kilometrage – distance markers show distance of local section
Poland	Silesian Voivodeship	Łaziska, Silesian Voivodeship			—	Gorzyczki	local road – Gorzyce / Godów	Unknown kilometrage – distance markers show distance of local section; access to national road 78 through local road in direction of Gorzyce
Poland	Silesian Voivodeship	Gorzyczki, Silesian Voivodeship			—	Czech Republic–Poland border	D1	Border with Czech Republic; road continues as the Czech D1
1.000 mi = 1.609 km; 1.000 km = 0.621 mi: Concurrency terminus; Incomplete access; Route transition

== See also ==
- Highways in Poland
- European route E75
