= Wilhelm Szewczyk =

Polish writer (1916–1991)

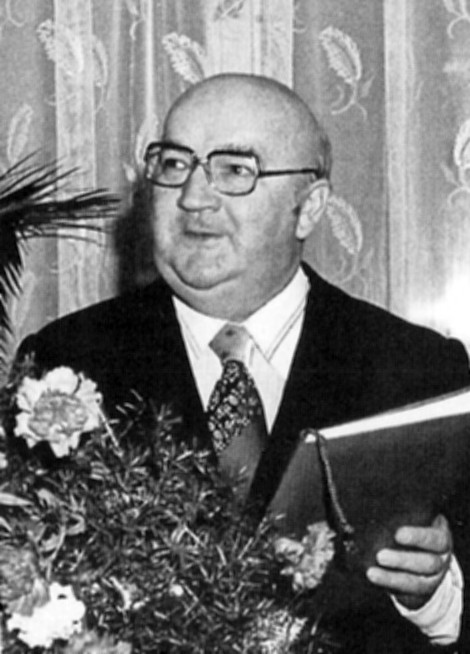
- Wilhelm Szewczyk
- Born: January 5, 1916; Czuchów, Czerwionka-Leszczyny, Province of Silesia
- Died: June 8, 1991 (aged 75); Katowice, Poland
- Occupations: Writer, poet, translator, politician

Wilhelm Szewczyk (5 January 1916 – 8 June 1991) was a Polish writer, poet, literary critic, translator, activist of the National Radical Camp, communist, and member of parliament from the region of Silesia.

He was born in Czuchów (now part of Czerwionka-Leszczyny, Rybnik County) and was raised in familok in Czerwionka. Szewczyk attended State Liceum in Rybnik and after finishing it relocated to Katowice; and until 1939 worked in local radio station of Polskie Radio.

During World War II he was forced to join the German Army and in 1941-1942 stayed on the Western Front in Normandy and later on the Eastern Front in Soviet Union. In August 1941 was injured at the battle of Smolensk. When healed in Thuringia, he was sent to Alsace to the front. For his pacifist stances was arrested and in 1942 jailed in Katowice.

After the war Szewczyk returned to Katowice where he worked as editor of Odra weekly and in 1947-1951 was a literary director of Silesian Theatre. He then worked in several literary magazines.

Szewczyk was also a deputy in the Sejm (Parliament) in 1957-1965 and 1969-1980. He died on 8 June 1991 in Katowice and is buried in the local Protestant Cemetery.

== Works ==
- Posągi (1945) - poetry collection
- Portret Łużyczanki Mina Witkojc (1948) - about the Lower Sorbian poetress, journalist and patriot Mina Witkojc
- Skarb Donnersmarcków (1956)
- Z kraju Lompy (1957)
- Wyprzedaż samotności (1959)
- Literatura niemiecka w XX wieku (1962, 1964)
- Od wiosny do jesieni (1965)
- Kleszcze
- Czarne słońce
- Klara Krause – short stories collection
- Syndrom śląski (1985) - collection of essays

== Bibliography ==
- Hierowski, Zdzisław (1947). 25 lat literatury na Śląsku 1920–1945. Katowice – Wrocław: Wydawnictwa Instytutu Śląskiego. OCLC 69489660.
