= Dębieńsko =

- District of Czerwionka-Leszczyny
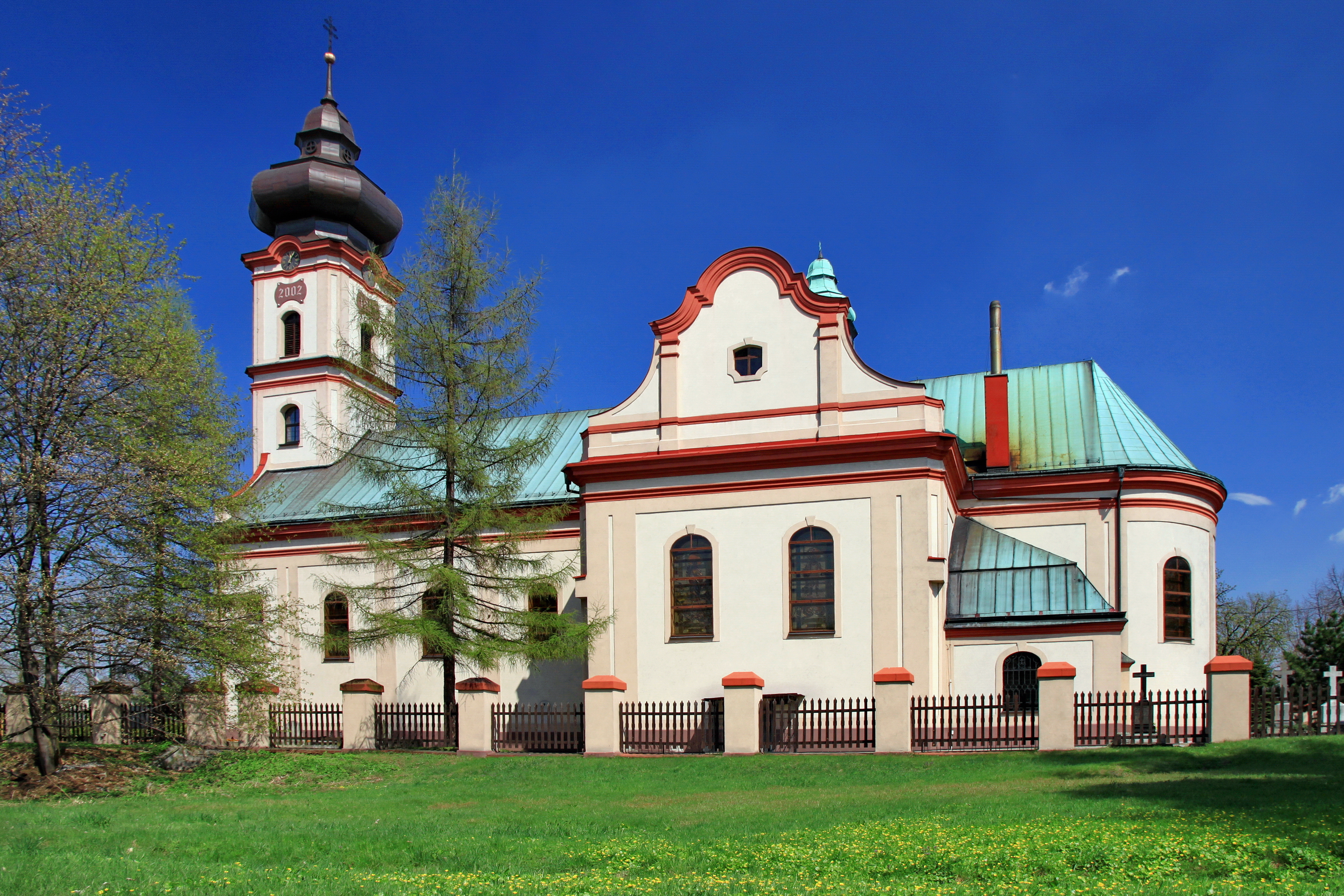
- Saint George church, built in 1798-1800
- Interactive map of Dębieńsko
- Coordinates: 50°10′05″N 18°42′59″E
- Country: Poland
- Voivodeship: Silesian
- County: Rybnik
- Gmina: Czerwionka-Leszczyny
- Town: Czerwionka-Leszczyny
- First mentioned: 1306
- Within town limits: 1977

Area
  - Total: 1,501 km^{2} (580 sq mi)
- Time zone: UTC+1 (CET)
  - Summer (DST): UTC+2 (CEST)
- Vehicle registration: SRB

Dębieńsko (German: Dubensko) is a dzielnica (district) of Czerwionka-Leszczyny, Silesian Voivodeship, southern Poland. It was an independent village, but became administratively part of Leszczyny in 1977, renamed to Czerwionka-Leszczyny in 1992. It has an area of 15,01 km^{2}.

Historically Dębieńsko was subdivided into two municipalities:

- Dębieńsko Stare (German: Alt Dubensko, lit. Old Dębieńsko),
- Dębieńsko Wielkie (German: Gross Dubensko, lit. Great Dębieńsko);

== History ==
It is one of the oldest settlement in the area, Czerwionka, Leszczyny, Ciosek and Ornontowice were established within Dębieńsko's original borders.

The village was first mentioned in 1306. It became a seat of a Catholic parish in Żory deanery in Diocese of Wrocław, mentioned in 1335 as Dambin in an incomplete register of Peter's Pence payment, composed by Galhard de Carceribus.

Politically the village belonged then to the Duchy of Racibórz, within feudally fragmented Poland. In 1327 the duchy became a fee of the Kingdom of Bohemia, which after 1526 became part of the Habsburg monarchy. After Silesian Wars it became a part of the Kingdom of Prussia, and in 1871 it became part of Germany.

After World War I in the Upper Silesia plebiscite 461 out of 586 voters in Stare Dębieńsko (Alt Dubensko) voted in favour of rejoining Poland which just regained independence, against 125 for Germany, whereas in Dębieńsko Wielkie (Gross Dubensko, manor goods) it was 85 out of 116 against 31. The village became a part of autonomous Silesian Voivodeship in Second Polish Republic.

Following the joint German-Soviet invasion of Poland, which started World War II in September 1939, it was annexed by Nazi Germany. During the occupation, the German Nazi government operated the E324 forced labour subcamp of the Stalag VIII-B/344 prisoner-of-war camp in the village. After the war it was restored to Poland.

In years 1945-1954 Dębieńsko Stare together with Dębieńsko Wielkie formed a gmina. In 1973 the gmina was not re-established, instead Dębieńsko became till 1977 a part of gmina Ornontowice, after which it was absorbed by Leszczyny (later renamed to Czerwionka-Leszczyny).
