= Palowice =

- Village
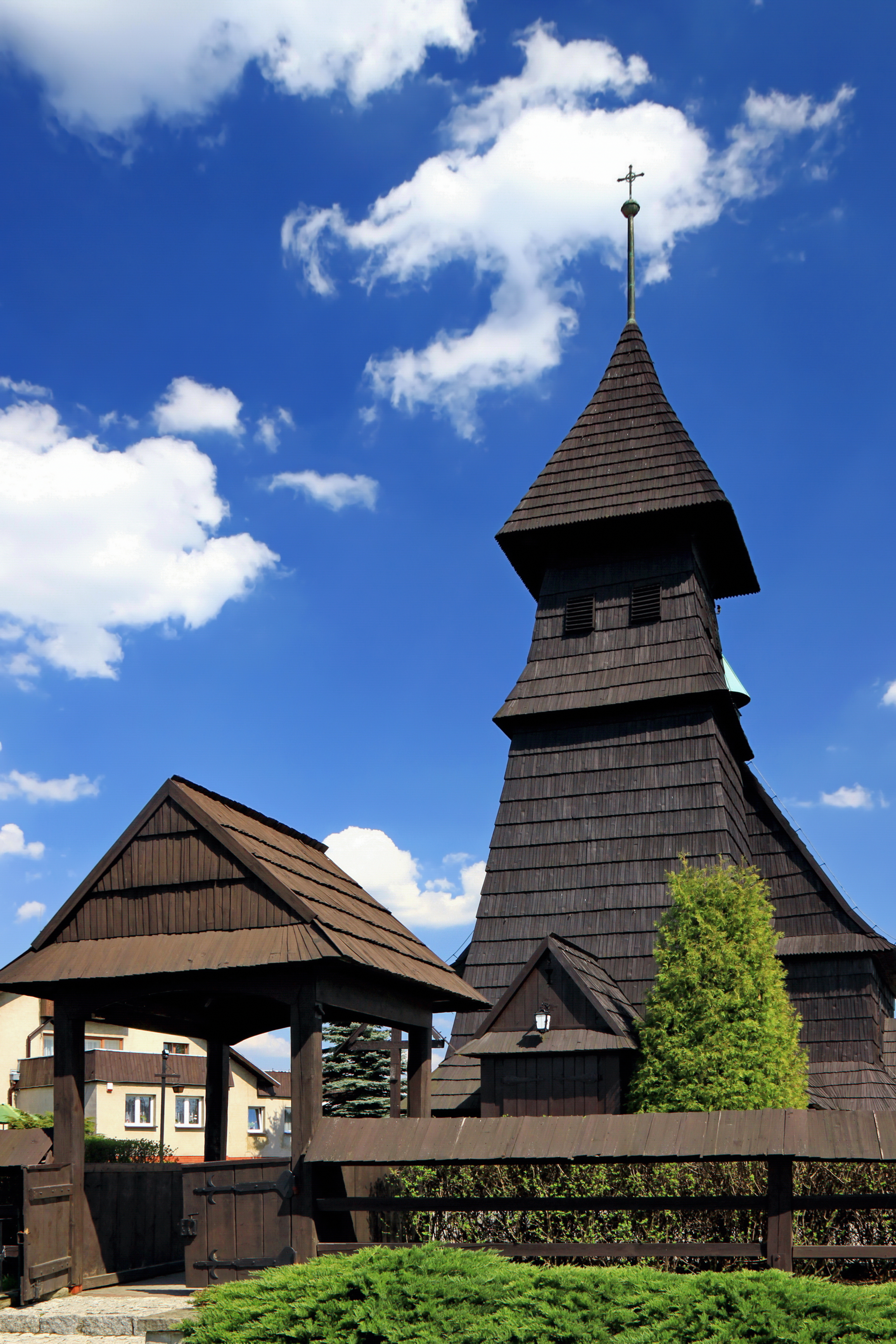
- Holy Trinity parish church

- Location within Poland
- Coordinates: 50°7′N 18°45′E
- Country: Poland
- Voivodeship: Silesian
- County: Rybnik
- Gmina: Czerwionka-Leszczyny
- Population: 1,394
- Website: http://www.palowice.net/

Palowice [palɔˈvit͡sɛ] is a village in the administrative district of Gmina Czerwionka-Leszczyny, within Rybnik County, Silesian Voivodeship, in southern Poland.
