= Przegędza =

- Village
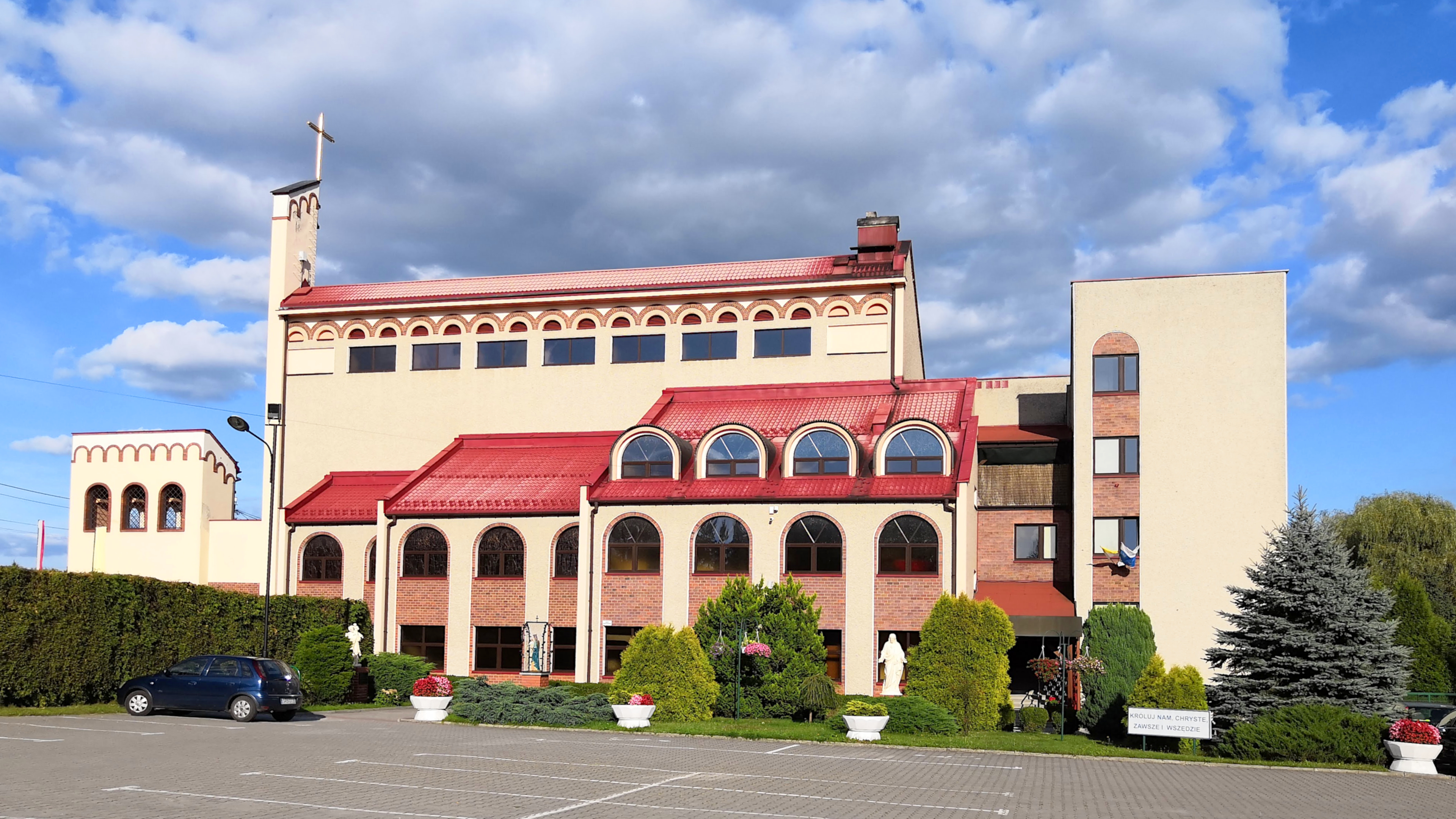
- Church of the Exaltation of the Holy Cross

- Location within Poland
- Coordinates: 50°7′N 18°38′E
- Country: Poland
- Voivodeship: Silesian
- County: Rybnik
- Gmina: Czerwionka-Leszczyny

Population
  - Total: 1,549

Przegędza [pʂɛˈɡɛnd͡za] is a village in the administrative district of Gmina Czerwionka-Leszczyny, within Rybnik County, Silesian Voivodeship, in southern Poland.
