= Szczejkowice =

- Village
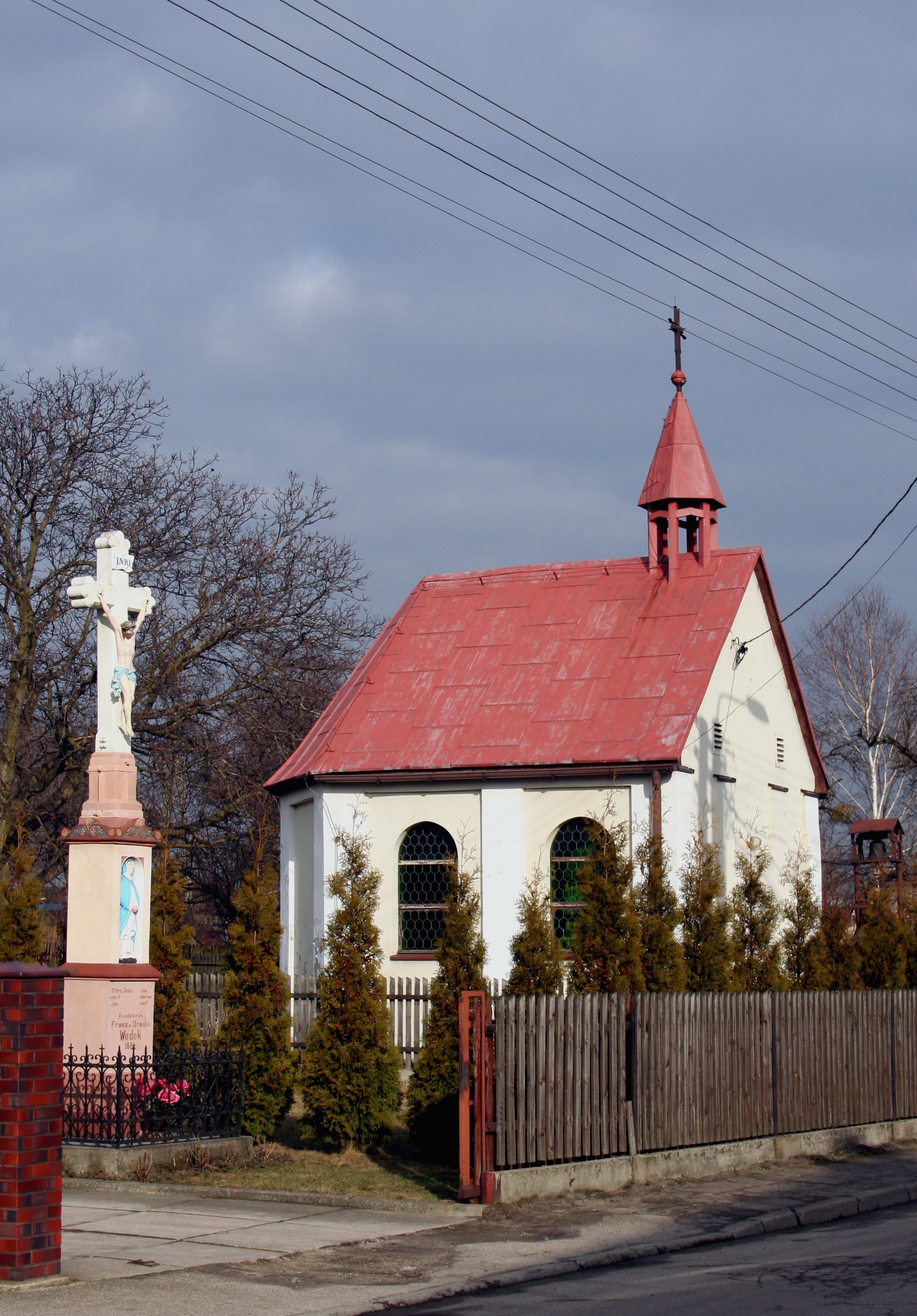
- Chapel

- Location within Poland
- Coordinates: 50°6′N 18°41′E
- Country: Poland
- Voivodeship: Silesian
- County: Rybnik
- Gmina: Czerwionka-Leszczyny
- Population: 1,543

Szczejkowice [ʂt͡ʂɛi̯kɔˈvit͡sɛ] is a village in the administrative district of Gmina Czerwionka-Leszczyny, within Rybnik County, Silesian Voivodeship, in southern Poland.
