= Czuchów, Czerwionka-Leszczyny =

District in Silesian Voivodeship, Poland

Coordinates: 50°10′04″N 18°39′16″E

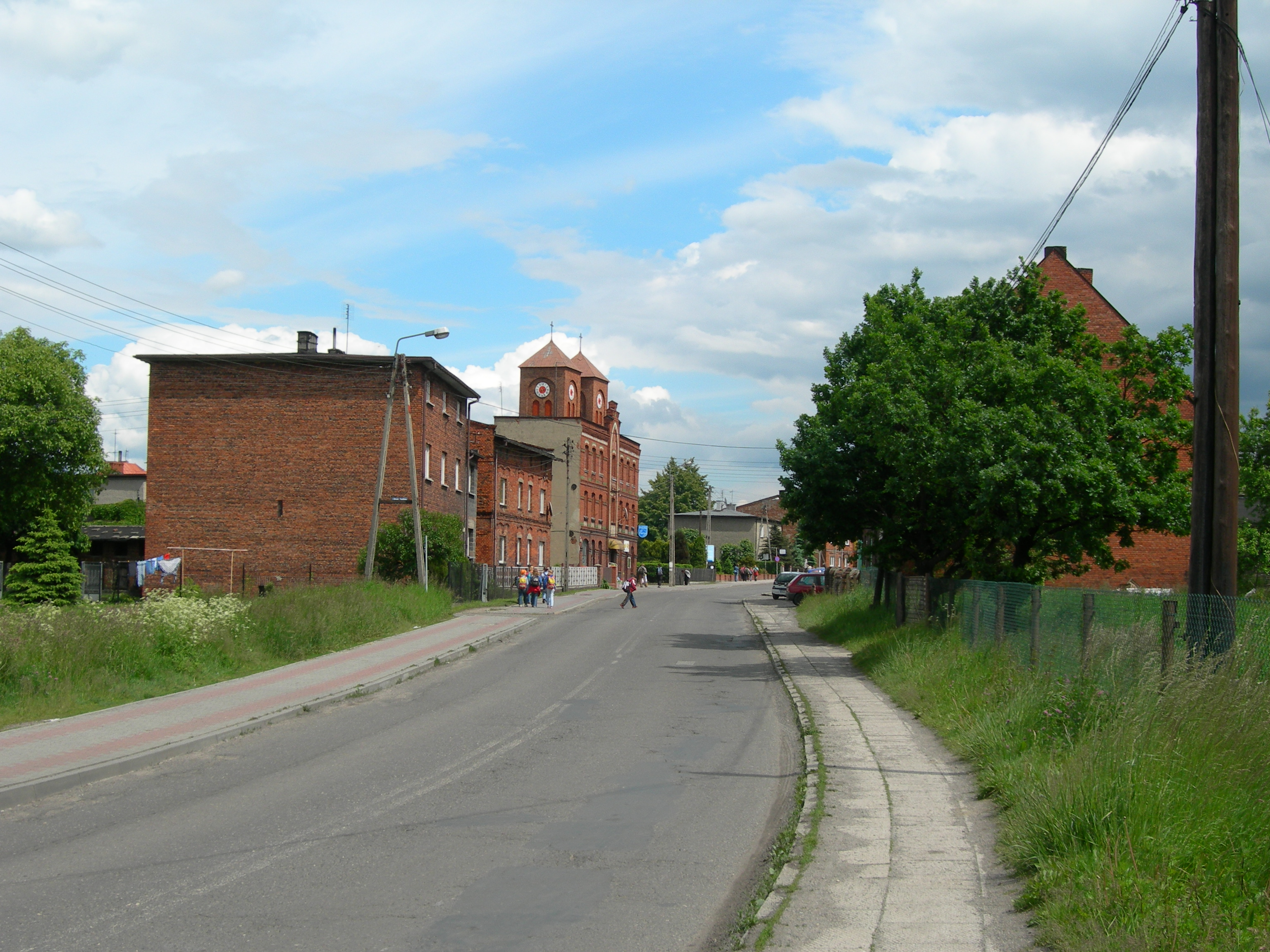
Czuchów's centre

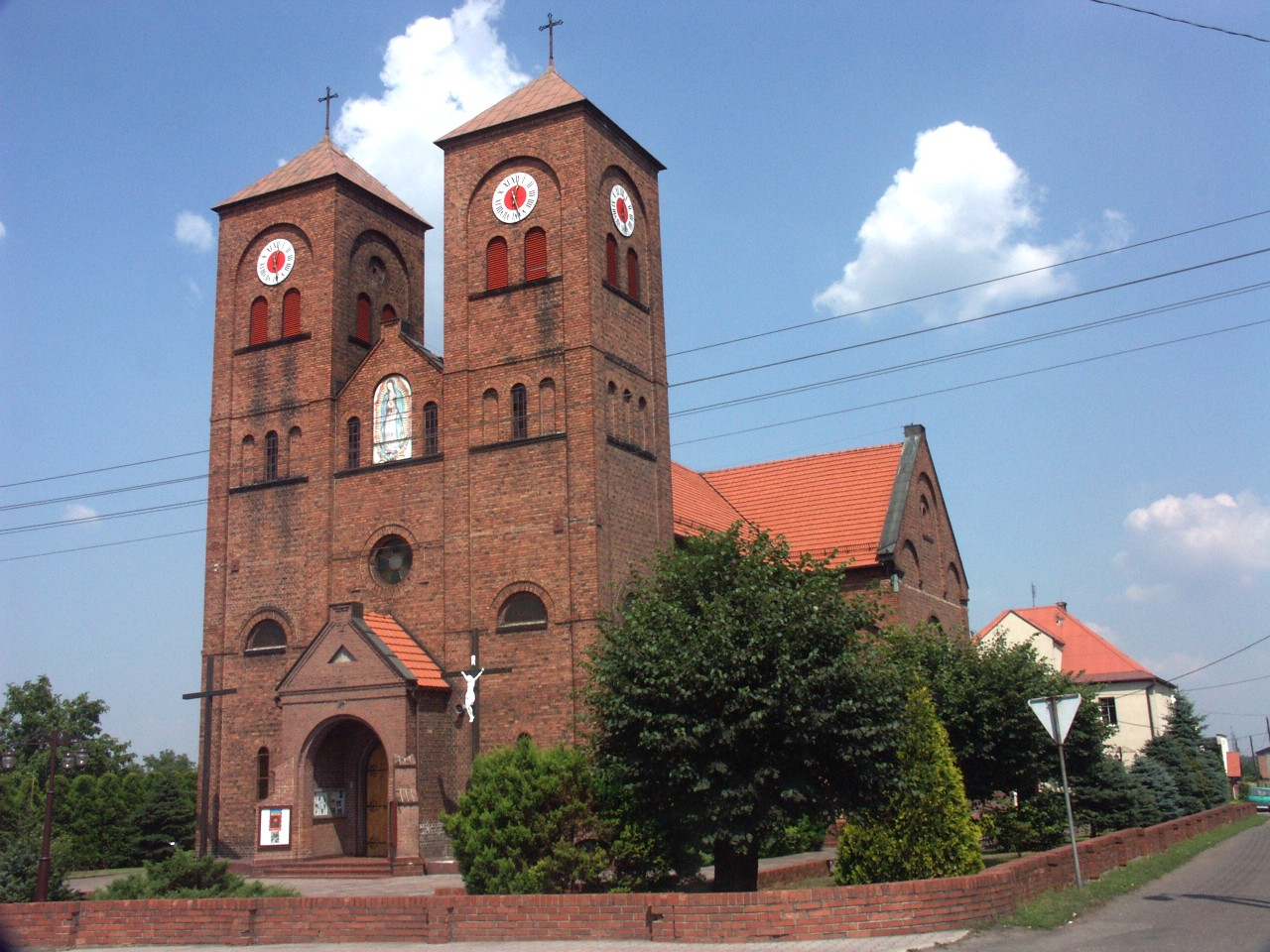
Saint Mary church

Czuchów (German: Czuchow) is a dzielnica (district) of Czerwionka-Leszczyny, Silesian Voivodeship, southern Poland. It was an independent village, but became administratively part of Leszczyny in 1955, renamed to Czerwionka-Leszczyny in 1992. It has an area of 9,07 km^{2}.

== History ==
The village was first mentioned as Schukaw in the first half of the 13th century. Politically the village belonged then to the Duchy of Opole and Racibórz, within feudally fragmented Poland. In 1327 Upper Silesian duchies became a fee of the Kingdom of Bohemia, which after 1526 became part of the Habsburg monarchy. After Silesian Wars it became a part of the Kingdom of Prussia.

After World War I in the Upper Silesia plebiscite 652 out of 959 voters in Czuchów voted in favour of joining Poland, against 305 who opted for staying in Germany. The village became a part of autonomous Silesian Voivodeship in Second Polish Republic. It was then annexed by Nazi Germany at the beginning of World War II. After the war it was restored to Poland.
