= Książenice =

Książenice may refer to:

- Książenice, Greater Poland Voivodeship, Poland
- Książenice, Masovian Voivodeship, Poland
- Książenice, Silesian Voivodeship, Poland
