= Kwiatkowskiego Way =

Coordinates: 54°32′08″N 18°29′29″E

Trasa Kwiatkowskiego
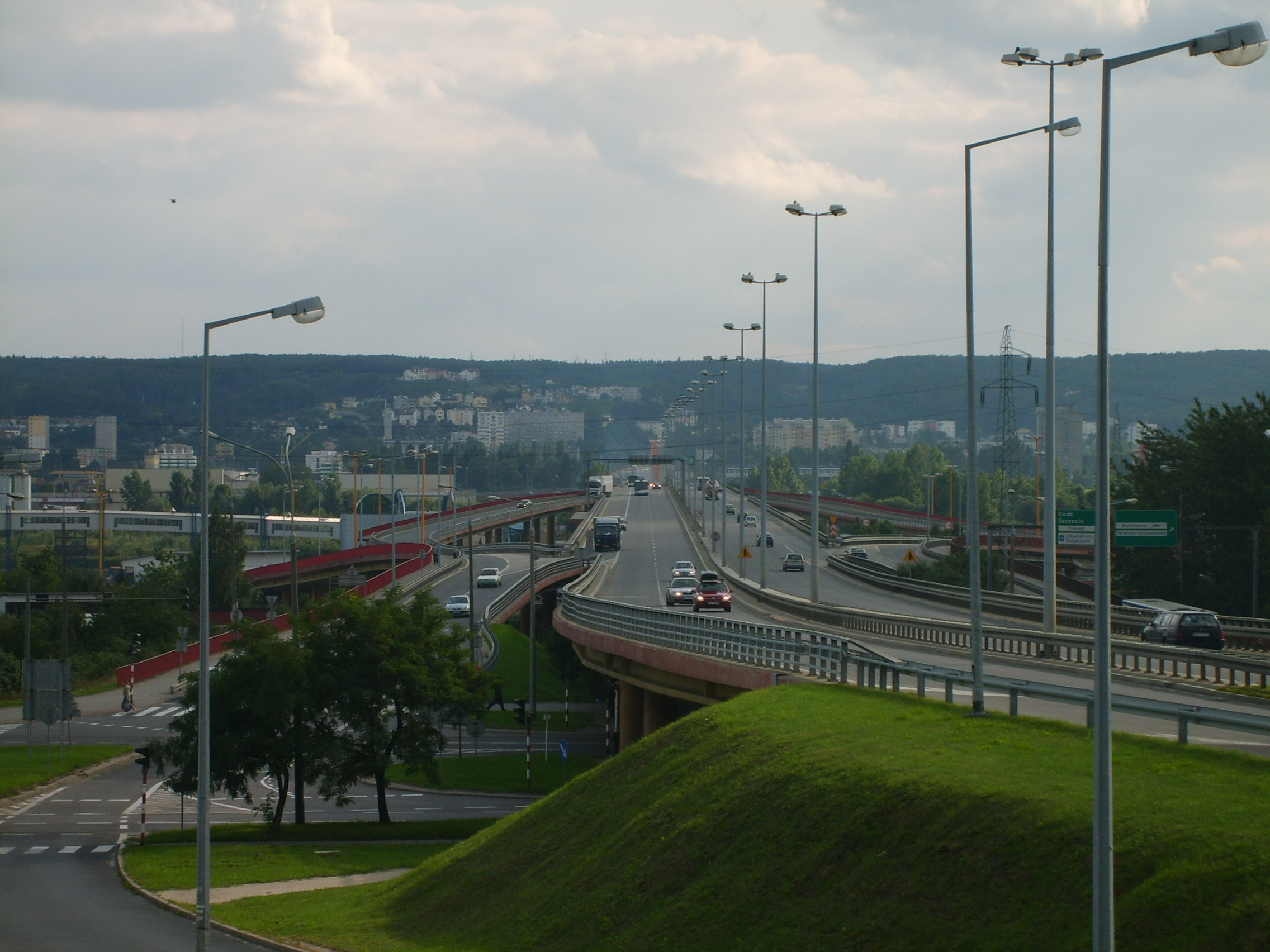

Route information
- Length: 5.4 km (3.4 mi)

Major junctions
- (0.2km) Ul. Adm. Unruga (0.5km) Railroad tracks leading to Gdynia Port Oksywie (PKP station) (0.7km) Port of Gdynia: Container Terminal; Ferry & Cruise Ship Terminal; (1.5km) ul. Janka Wisniewski (1.6km) SKM railroad tracks (1.9km) ul. Hutnicza (2.1km) PKP railroad tracks (2.6km) ul. Morska Viaduct Viaduct Tricity National Park Biking and hiking trail Demptowo Valley Forest road Forest road (5.4km) Obwodnica Trójmiejska

Location
- Country: Poland
- Regions: Pomeranian Voivodeship
- Major cities: Gdynia

Highway system
- National roads in Poland; Voivodeship roads

Trasa im. Eugeniusza Kwiatkowskiego (Trasa Kwiatkowskiego) – is a highway in Gdynia, Poland named after Eugeniusz Kwiatkowski linking the Port of Gdynia to the Tricity beltway (Obwodnica Trójmiejska) and therefore A1 motorway. It is currently 5.4 km long and was completed after 34 years of construction.

== Construction ==
=== 1st Stage of Construction ===
Construction began on August 30, 1974. According to initial plans the route was supposed to connect ul. Piotra Ściegiennego in Leszczynkach with ul. Czerwonych Kosynierów (currently ul. Morska), ul. Marchlewskiego (currently ul. Janka Wiśniewskiego), ul. Wincentego Gruny (currently ul. Adm. Unruga) in Obłużu and ul. płk. Dąbka. In later years a connection with the then under construction Obwodnica Trójmiejska was planned.

The first sections opened to traffic were two upper-deck causeways over the railroad and ul. Opata Hackiego and two over the Port of Gdynia. During the 80's construction was halted due to insufficient funds. Only two disconnected sections were completed and during the spring of 1990 the whole project was cancelled .

=== 2nd Stage of Construction ===
In 1995 a decision was made to continue the project as well as modernize the current sections. On November 13, 1998, after 22 years of construction, Trasa Kwiatkowskiego was opened to traffic from ul. Morską to ul. płk. Dąbka, altogether 2.316 km.

=== 3rd Stage of Construction ===
In 2005 the European Commission agreed to help finance the remaining part of Trasa Kwiatkowskiego, namely, the connection of the current route to Obwodnica Trójmiejska. In the same year work started on cutting trees on the route since most of it goes through the Tricity National Park as well as numerous biking and hiking trails. A tender was issued and bids from companies were received. In March 2006 Warbud S.A. was chosen to finish the construction.

Officially the construction on the 3rd stage started on August 21, 2006, and was completed in March 2008. The route was opened on June 12, 2008.

== See also ==
- Tricity Beltway
- European route E28
- Autostrada A1 (Poland)
- Tricity, Poland
- Gdańsk
- Sopot
- Gdynia
- Poland
- Roads and expressways in Poland
- Transport in Poland
