= Stanowice, Silesian Voivodeship =

Stanowice
- Village
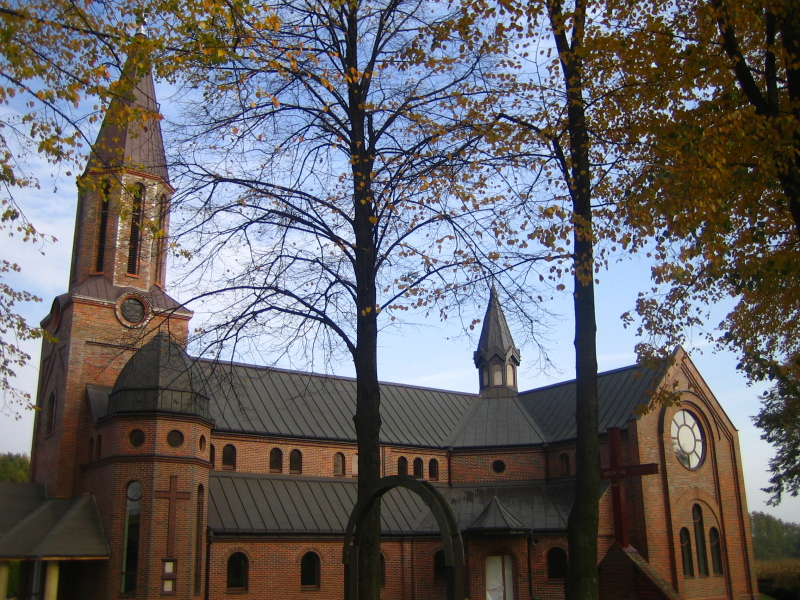
- Saint Jacek Church

- Location within Poland
- Coordinates: 50°7′50″N 18°40′21″E
- Country: Poland
- Voivodeship: Silesian
- County: Rybnik
- Gmina: Czerwionka-Leszczyny
- First mentioned: ca. 1305
- Population: 2,254

Stanowice [stanɔˈvit͡sɛ] is a village in the administrative district of Gmina Czerwionka-Leszczyny, within Rybnik County, Silesian Voivodeship, in southern Poland.

== History ==
The village was first mentioned in a Latin document of Diocese of Wrocław called Liber fundationis episcopatus Vratislaviensis from around 1305 as iem in Stanowitz decima episcopalis.
