= Bełk, Silesian Voivodeship =

Bełk
- Village
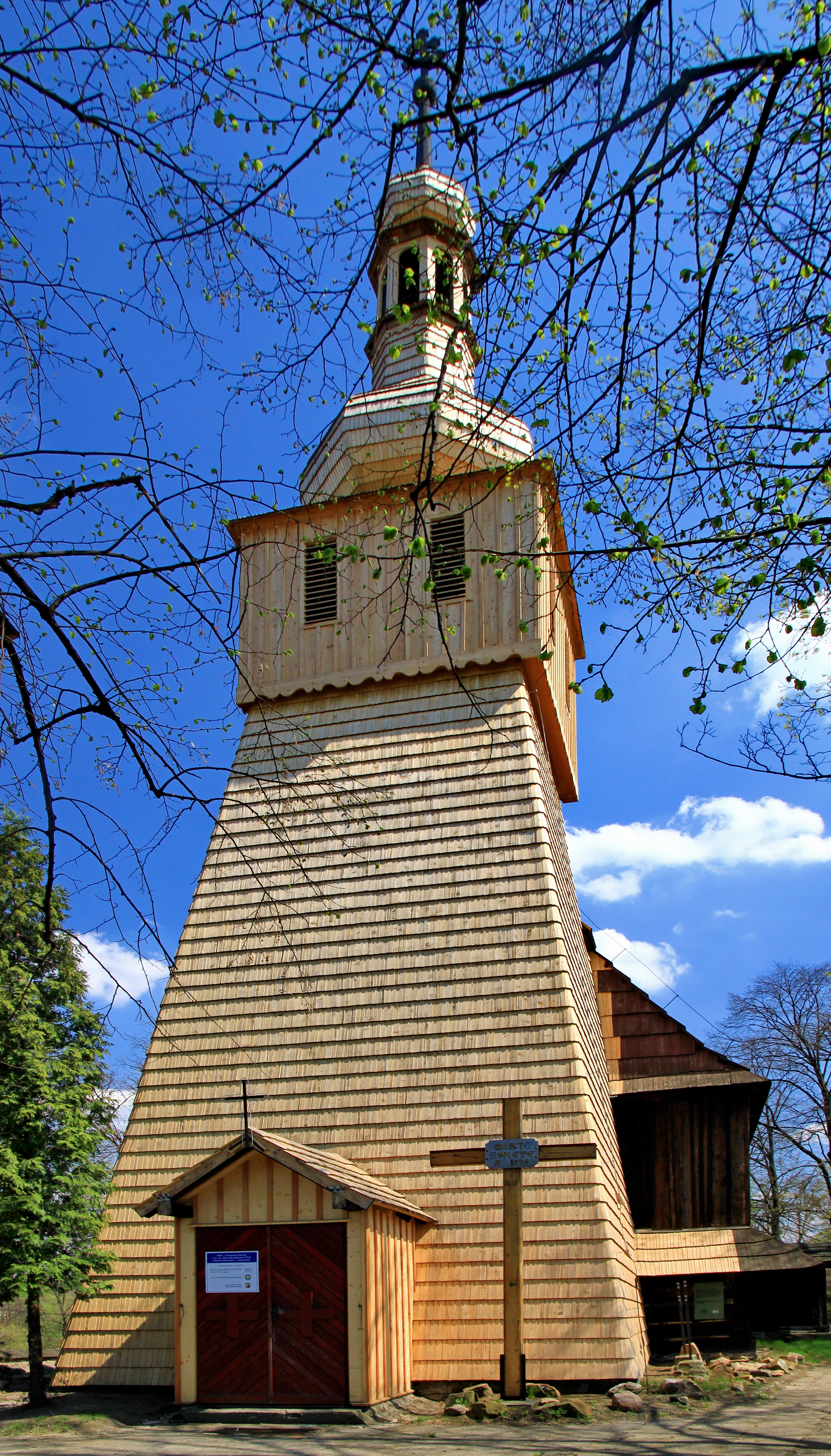
- Saint Mary Magdalene Church

- Coat of arms

- Location within Poland
- Coordinates: 50°7′51″N 18°42′36″E
- Country: Poland
- Voivodeship: Silesian
- County: Rybnik
- Gmina: Czerwionka-Leszczyny
- First mentioned: 1289
- Population: 3,358

Bełk [bɛu̯k] is a village in the administrative district of Gmina Czerwionka-Leszczyny, within Rybnik County, Silesian Voivodeship, in southern Poland.

The village has an area of 15.43 km^{2} (5.96 sq mi) and a population of 3,358.

== History ==
The village was first mentioned 1289, when it belonged to a knight Andrzej (Andrew) nicknamed Belick. It was later also mentioned in a Latin document of Diocese of Wrocław called Liber fundationis episcopatus Vratislaviensis from around 1305 as Item apud Belconem ernut 30 mansi soluentes fertones expela libertate, de quibus prepositura Opoliensis de agris dudum cultis habet tres reliqui uero ad mensam domini episcopi pertinebunt.

The village became a seat of a Catholic parish in Żory deanery in Diocese of Wrocław, first mentioned in 1447 as Belk, in a complete register of Peter's Pence payment, composed by Nicholaum Wolff, an archdeacon of Opole.
