= Jejkowice =

- Village
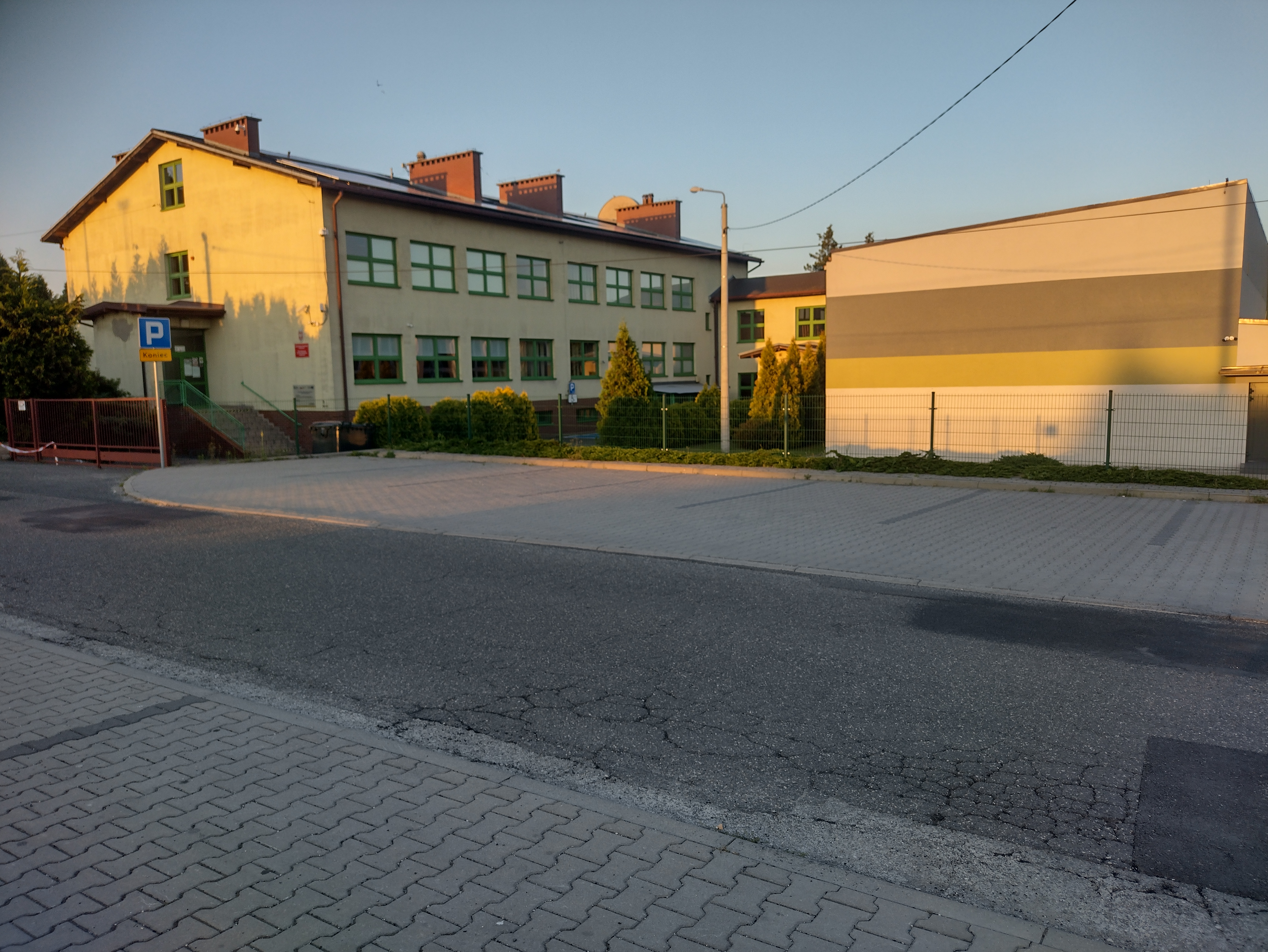
- School in Jejkowice

- Location within Poland
- Coordinates: 50°6′25″N 18°28′4″E
- Country: Poland
- Voivodeship: Silesian
- County: Rybnik County
- Gmina: Jejkowice
- Highest elevation: 280 m (920 ft)
- Lowest elevation: 260 m (850 ft)

Population
  - Total: 3,540
- Time zone: UTC+1 (CET)
  - Summer (DST): UTC+2 (CEST)
- Vehicle registration: SRB
- Website: http://www.jejkowice.pl/

Jejkowice [jɛi̯kɔˈvit͡sɛ] (German Jeykowitz, old name Jajkowice) is a village in Rybnik County, Silesian Voivodeship, in southern Poland. It is the seat of the gmina (administrative district) called Gmina Jejkowice. It lies approximately 7 kilometres (4 mi) north-west of Rybnik and 42 km (26 mi) south-west of the regional capital Katowice.

During World War II, a local Polish policeman was murdered by the Russians in the Katyn massacre in 1940.
