= Gmina Jejkowice =

Gmina Jejkowice Jejkowice Commune
- Gmina
- Coat of arms
- Interactive map of Gmina Jejkowice
- Coordinates (Jejkowice): 50°6′25″N 18°28′4″E
- Country: Poland
- Voivodeship: Silesian
- County: Rybnik
- Seat: Jejkowice

Area
  - Total: 7.59 km^{2} (2.93 sq mi)

Population (2019-06-30)
  - Total: 4,139
  - Density: 545/km^{2} (1,410/sq mi)
- Website: http://www.jejkowice.pl

Gmina Jejkowice is a rural gmina (administrative district) in Rybnik County, Silesian Voivodeship, in southern Poland. Its seat is the village of Jejkowice, which lies approximately 7 kilometres (4 mi) north-west of Rybnik and 42 km (26 mi) south-west of the regional capital Katowice.

The gmina covers an area of 7.59 square kilometres (2.9 sq mi), and as of 2019, its total population was 4,139. It has the smallest area of any rural gmina in Poland.

== Neighbouring gminas ==
Gmina Jejkowice is bordered by the towns of Rybnik and Rydułtowy, and by the gmina of Gaszowice.

== Twin towns – sister cities ==
Gmina Jejkowice is twinned with:

- Služovice, Czech Republic
