= Tricity Ring Road =

Road in Pomeranian Voivodeship, Poland

Coordinates: 54.3762°N 18.5142°E

Expressway S6
- Droga ekspresowa S6
- Obwodnica Trójmiejska

Route information
- Length: 38.6 km (24.0 mi)

Major junctions
- (1) ul. Morska DW 468 (2) ul. Jaskółcza (3) ul. Sakowicza (4) Trasa Kwiatkowskiego (5) Chwarzno (6) Wielki Kack S 6 E28 (7) ul. Źródło Marii (8) PKP railroad tracks 201 (9) Wysoka DW 218 (10) Owczarnia (11) Pomeranian Metropolitan Railway 248 (12) Matarnia (Gdańsk Lech Wałęsa Airport) (13) Karczemki DK 7 E77 (14) Szadółki (15) Kowale DW 221 (16) Gdańsk Południe S 7 E28 (southern bypass of Gdańsk) (17) Straszyn DW 222 (18) Radunia (19) Pruszcz Gdański DW 226 (20) Rusocin A 1 E75 (21) Pruszcz Gdański DK 91 E75

Location
- Country: Poland
- Regions: Pomeranian Voivodeship
- Major cities: Gdynia, Gdańsk, Sopot

Highway system
- National roads in Poland; Voivodeship roads

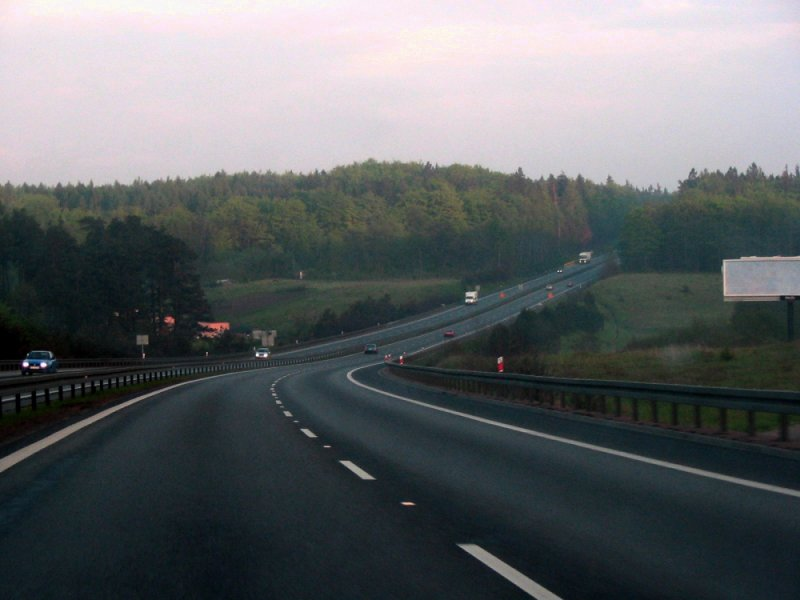

The Tricity Ring Road (Polish: Obwodnica trójmiejska, Obwodnica Trójmiasta, Trasa Obwodowa Trójmiasta) is a ring road in Poland bypassing the metropolitan area formed by the cities of Gdynia, Sopot and Gdańsk commonly known as the Tricity. The beltway runs north to south from Gdynia to Pruszcz Gdański and is 38.6 km (24.0 mi) long. It forms a part of the S6 expressway which runs from Szczecin to Gdańsk. It is also part of the European route E28.

== History ==
Construction started in the 1970s and the first section was opened for use in 1977. Due to a lack of funds during the 1980s, construction was delayed many times. The fall of communism in 1990 also slowed down construction. Major sections of the beltway were completed in 2001 with the last two major junctions finished in 2008.

The various stages were constructed in the following years:

- 1973–1977: northbound lanes Gdynia – Pruszcz Gdański
- 1978–1984: southbound lanes Gdynia – Straszyn
- 1987–1989: Kowale Junction
- 1994–1996: Wysoka Junction
- 2000–2001: southbound lanes Straszyn – Juszkowo
- 2002–2003: road maintenance and resurfacing
- 2006–2007: a junction connecting the south end of the Tricity Beltway to the A1 motorway has been completed by 22 December 2007, first enabling travel up to Grudziądz and, after the A1 was completed, through Toruń, Łódź and Katowice, to the Czech border
- 2006–2008: junction with Trasa Kwiatkowskiego: on 12 June 2008, Trasa im. Eugeniusza Kwiatkowskiego was completed and finally connected the Port of Gdynia to the beltway, bypassing the local city streets. This reduced truck traffic in residential areas greatly since all heavy trucks heading towards the port used National road 6, which at the time went through the center of the city

In 2012 a 18 km stretch of the S7 expressway was opened in Gdańsk, extending from the S6 eastward, forming the southern bypass of Gdańsk.

In December 2025, a new beltway called the Tricity Metropolitan Ring Road was opened, forming the main transit route around Tricity. The new bypass, as well as the northern part of the original bypass, have been marked as S7. The new route from Szczecin and Koszalin (Trasa Kaszubska) as well as the main section of the original bypass are designated as S6 and E28.

== Transport infrastructure ==
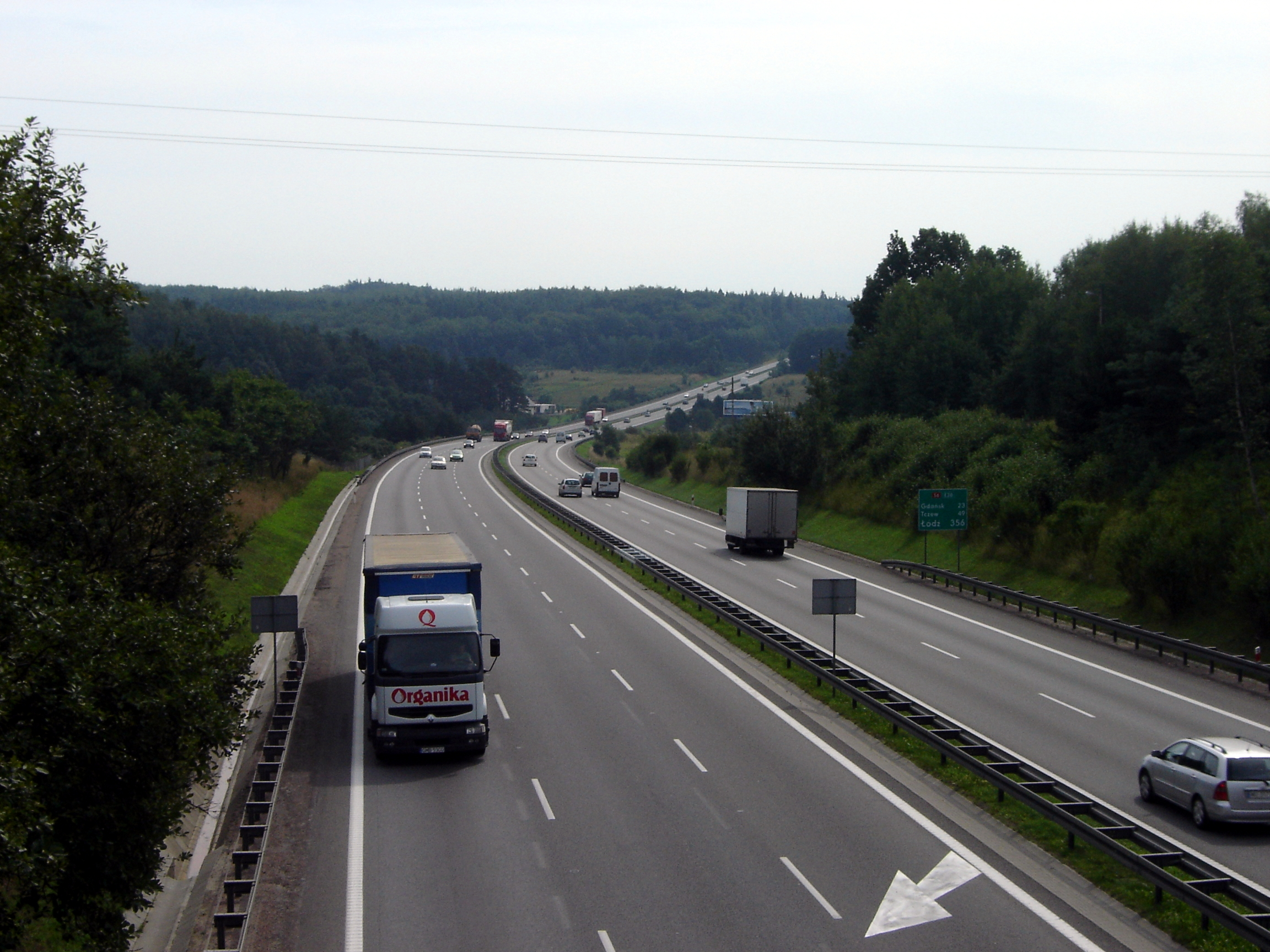
Obwodnica Trójmiasta – The extra third lane is visible on the left

The beltway is an important piece of infrastructure in the Pomeranian Voivodeship easing congestion through the center of the Tricity area and diverting transit traffic. The beltway also connects the Gdańsk Lech Wałęsa Airport with the rest of the Voivodeship.

The Tricity Ring Road was one of the first orbital, beltway and ring roads that bypass major cities in Poland.
