= Książenice, Silesian Voivodeship =

Książenice
- Village
- Location within Poland
- Coordinates: 50°09′14″N 18°35′57″E
- Country: Poland
- Voivodeship: Silesian
- County: Rybnik
- Gmina: Czerwionka-Leszczyny
- First mentioned: 1223
- Population: 2,466

Książenice is a village in the administrative district of Gmina Czerwionka-Leszczyny, within Rybnik County, Silesian Voivodeship, in southern Poland.

The village has an area of 16.42 km^{2} (6.34 sq mi) and a population of 2,466.
