= Gmina Czerwionka-Leszczyny =

Gmina Czerwionka-Leszczyny Czerwionka-Leszczyny Commune
- Gmina
- Coat of arms
- Interactive map of Gmina Czerwionka-Leszczyny
- Coordinates (Czerwionka-Leszczyny): 50°9′N 18°41′E
- Country: Poland
- Voivodeship: Silesian
- County: Rybnik
- Seat: Czerwionka-Leszczyny

Area
  - Total: 115.65 km^{2} (44.65 sq mi)

Population (2019-06-30)
  - Total: 42,152
  - Density: 364.48/km^{2} (944.00/sq mi)
  - Urban: 28,156
  - Rural: 13,996
- Time zone: UTC+1 (CET)
  - Summer (DST): UTC+2 (CEST)
- Vehicle registration: SRB
- Website: https://www.czerwionka-leszczyny.pl

Gmina Czerwionka-Leszczyny is an urban-rural gmina (administrative district) in Rybnik County, Silesian Voivodeship, in southern Poland. Its seat is the town of Czerwionka-Leszczyny, which lies approximately 15 kilometres (9 mi) north-east of Rybnik and 24 km (15 mi) west of the regional capital Katowice.

The gmina covers an area of 115.65 square kilometres (44.7 sq mi), and as of 2019 its total population is 42,152.

The gmina contains part of the protected area called Rudy Landscape Park.

== Villages ==
Apart from the town of Czerwionka-Leszczyny, Gmina Czerwionka-Leszczyny contains the villages and settlements of Bełk, Książenice, Palowice, Przegędza, Stanowice and Szczejkowice.

== Neighbouring gminas ==
Gmina Czerwionka-Leszczyny is bordered by the towns of Knurów, Orzesze, Rybnik and Żory, and by the gminas of Ornontowice and Pilchowice.

== Twin towns – sister cities ==
Gmina Czerwionka-Leszczyny is twinned with:

- Cacica, Romania
- Dubno, Ukraine
- Jēkabpils, Latvia
- Sokołów Podlaski, Poland
