= Sośnica, Gliwice =

District of the city of Gliwice, Poland

Sośnica
- District of Gliwice
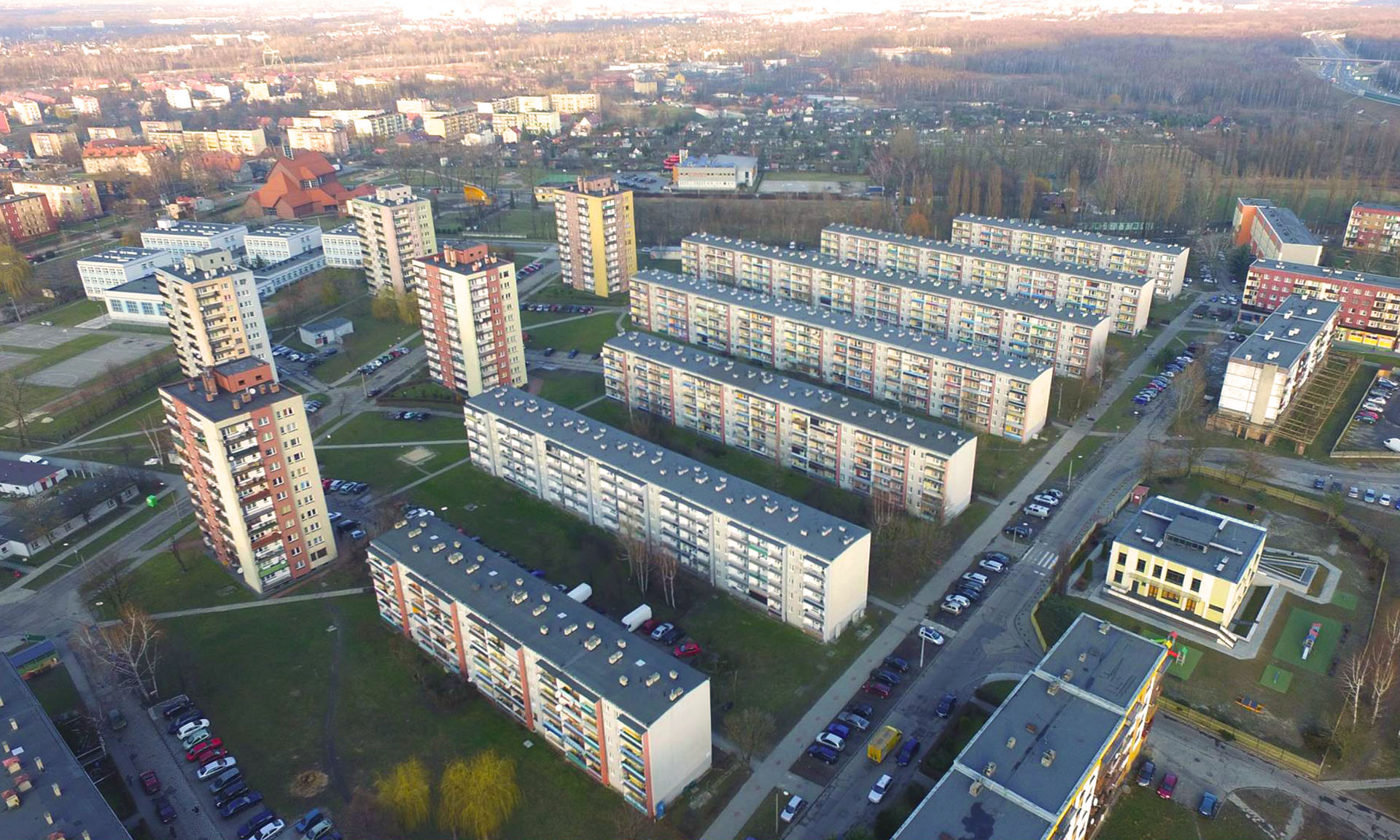

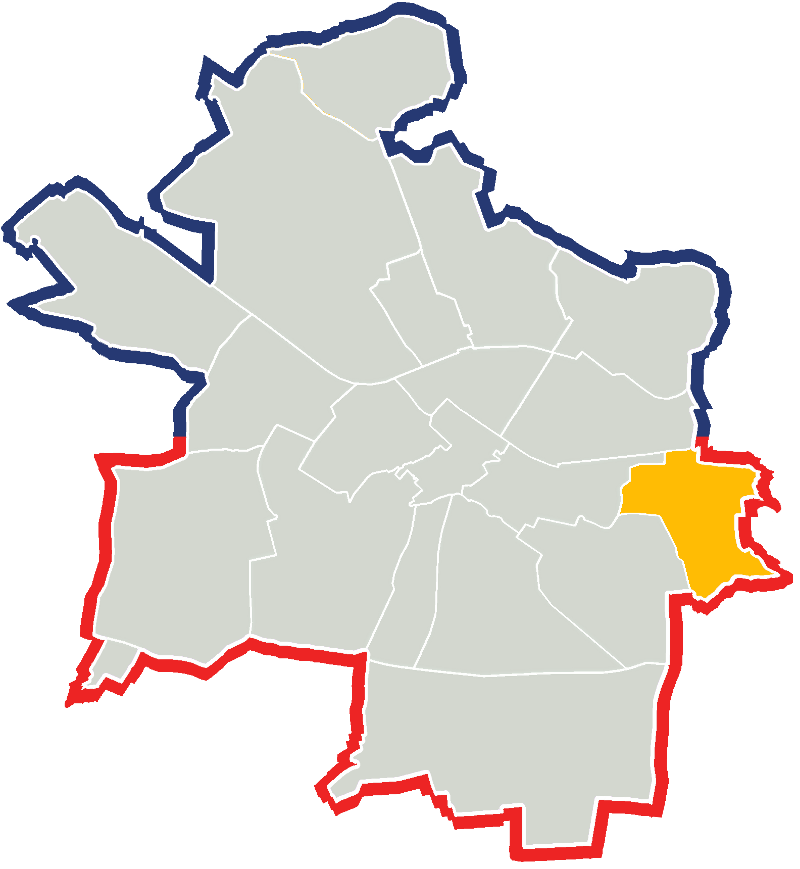
- Location of Sośnica within Gliwice

- Location within Poland
- Coordinates: 50°16′49″N 18°43′57″E
- Country: Poland
- Voivodeship: Silesian
- County/City: Gliwice
- Established: 1260
- Within city limits: 1927
- Time zone: UTC+1 (CET)
  - Summer (DST): UTC+2 (CEST)
- Vehicle registration: SG
- Primary airport: Katowice Airport

Sośnica is a district of Gliwice, Poland, located in the eastern part of the city.

It is bordered by the districts of Wincentów in the north, Wólka Klwatecka in the west, Młynek Janiszewski, Jóżefów, Mleczna and Huta Józefowska in the south and Krzewień in the east.

== History ==
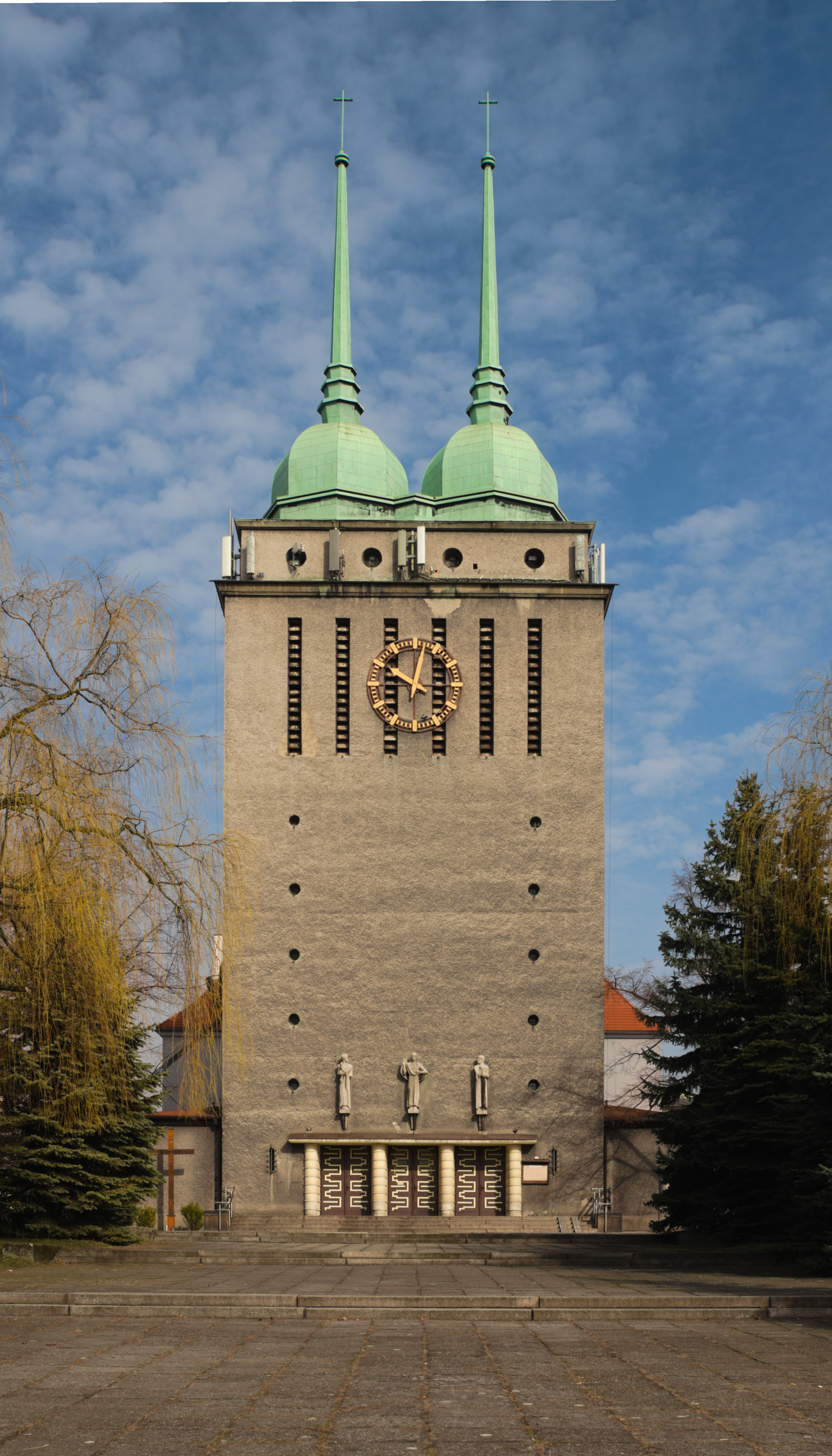
Saint Mary of Help church

Sośnica was established in 1260 by Tomasz I, bishop of Wrocław within fragmented Piast-ruled Poland. The name is of Polish origin and comes from the word sosna which means "pine".

It was annexed by Prussia in the 1740s, and from 1871 it was also part of Germany. It was subjected to Germanisation policies. Following World War I, Poland regained independence, and the majority of the citizens voted to rejoin Poland in the Upper Silesia plebiscite of 1921, however, the settlement remained within Germany in the interbellum. On 9 April 1922, 17 French troops died in an explosion during the liquidation of a German militia weapons warehouse in the settlement. Polish activists were increasingly persecuted since 1937.

During World War II, in 1940, the Germans arrested local Polish parish priest Antoni Korczok, deported him to the Dachau concentration camp, and murdered him there the following year. His successor Jerzy Jonienc was arrested in July 1941, but was released in September 1941. The Germans established and operated the E22 and E452 forced labour subcamps of the Stalag VIII-B/344 prisoner-of-war camp for Allied POWs in the district. After the war, Sośnica became again part of Poland.

== Sports ==
The Sośnica Gliwice women's handball team is based in Sośnica.

== Notable people ==
- Włodzimierz Lubański (born 1947), retired footballer
- Joachim Marx (born 1944), retired footballer
- Lukas Podolski (born 1985), footballer
- Jacek Wiśniewski (born 1974), retired footballer
