= Czerwionka-Leszczyny =

Town in Silesian Voivodeship, Poland

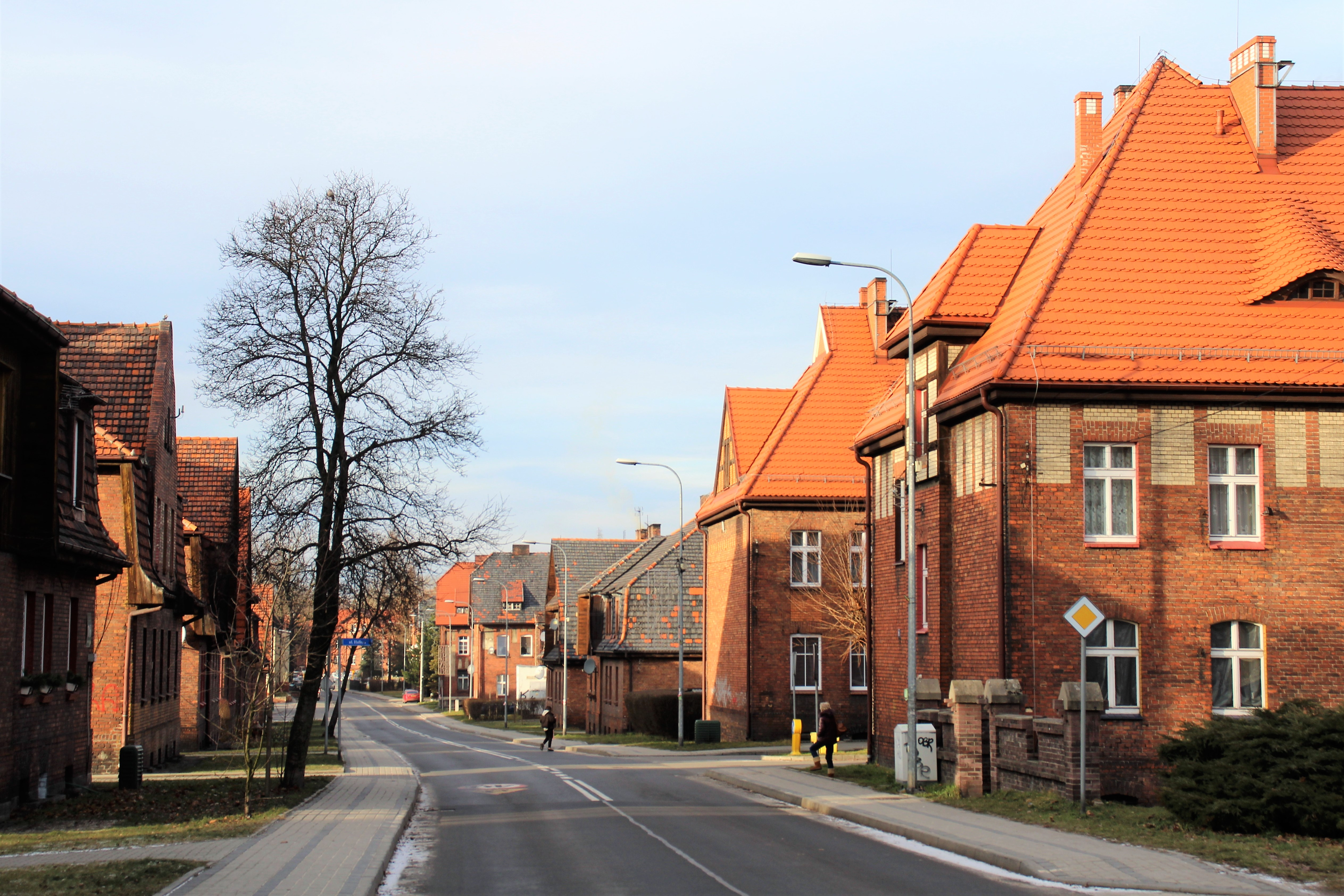

- Coat of arms

- Location within Poland
- Coordinates: 50°11′N 18°41′E
- Country: Poland
- Voivodeship: Silesian
- County: Rybnik
- Gmina: Czerwionka-Leszczyny

Government
  - Mayor: Wiesław Janiszewski

Area
  - City: 37.63 km^{2} (14.53 sq mi)

Population (31 December 2021)
  - City: 27,683
  - Density: 735.7/km^{2} (1,905/sq mi)
  - Urban: 2,746,000
  - Metro: 5,294,000
- Time zone: UTC+1 (CET)
  - Summer (DST): UTC+2 (CEST)
- Postal code: 44-230
- Area code: +48 32
- Car plates: SRB
- Website: https://www.czerwionka-leszczyny.pl

Czerwionka-Leszczyny [t͡ʂɛrˈvʲɔŋka lɛʂˈt͡ʂɨnɨ] is a town in Silesian Voivodeship in southern Poland. It is the only town in Rybnik county (which is separate from Rybnik city) and the seat of the larger Czerwionka-Leszczyny municipality which also includes 6 villages. Czerwionka-Leszczyny was created by a merger of two towns (Czerwionka and Leszczyny) and two villages (Czuchów and Dębieńsko), which to this day maintain their separate identities. As of December 2021, the town has a population of 27,683.

A former mining town, it has transformed into a commuter town for the nearby cities of Rybnik, Gliwice and Katowice.

== Geography ==
Czerwionka-Leszczyny is a town in Silesia in southern Poland, on the Bierawka River (tributary of the Oder), located on Silesian Highlands, about 50 km (31 mi) (31 mi) north of the Silesian Beskids. It is an outer suburb of Metropolis GZM, with a population of over 3 million, and a suburb of Rybnik, both making Katowice-Ostrava metropolitan area with a population of 4,676,983 people.

== History ==
=== Pre-industrial age ===
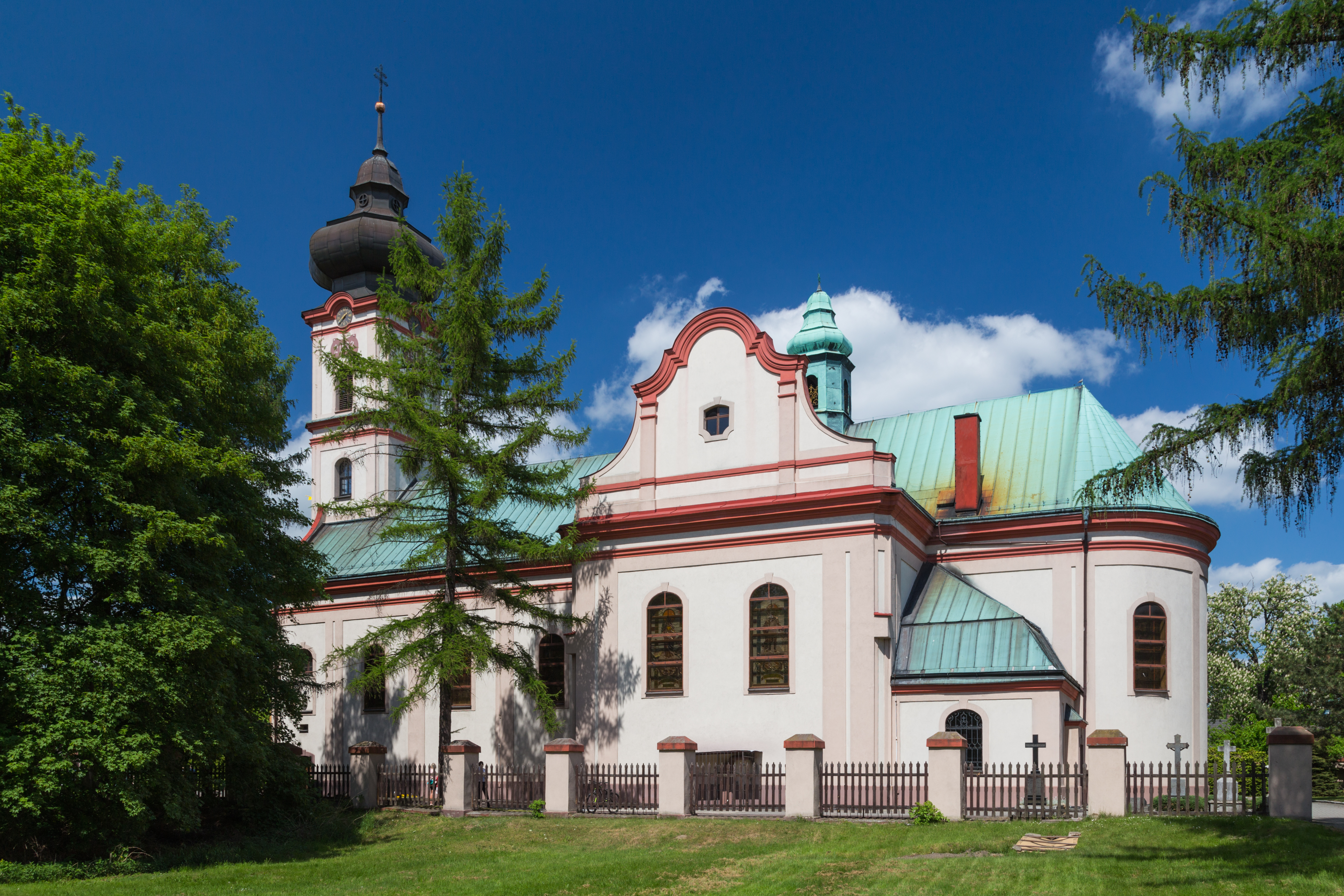
Baroque Church of Saint George

People have settled in the area of Czerwionka-Leszczyny as early as 8th century BC, as evidenced by a Bronze Age bracelet that was found in Czerwionka and is currently stored in a museum in Gliwice. The first written sources mentioning Leszczyny, Liber Fundationis Episcopus Wratislaviensis (book proclaiming the foundation of the Wrocław diocese), dates back to 1305. In 1420, a parish was founded in Dębieńsko, and in 1447 Leszczyny parish is mentioned for the first time. In the middle ages, the area of modern Czerwionka-Leszczyny belonged to the Kingdom of Poland, next Polish Duchy of Racibórz as a result of the division of Poland into districts in the Middle Ages, and since 1327 was under Czech suzerainty and became a part of the Holy Roman Empire. Since 1526, the area of Czerwionka-Leszczyny belonged to the Habsburg monarchy. Following the Silesian Wars, Prussia conquered these territories in 1742. In 1818, a new administrative division placed the area of modern Czerwionka-Leszczyny in Rybnik county.

=== Industrial age ===
==== Early industrial age ====
The exploration of natural resources in Czerwionka-Leszczyny area started in the 17th century. In 1788 the first test shaft were created to confirm hard coal reserves, and in 1792 the owner of Czerwionka and Dębieńsko, baron von Wilczek, secured a permit for the first mine, Neues Glück (New luck). In 1806, coal mine Ciossek and in 1807 coal mine Marianne were opened by count Węgierski. In 1813 Neues Glück was merged with nearby Anton shaft to create Antons Glück (Anthony's luck) coal mine, which since 1823 produced 14,000 tonnes of coal annually. By 1850, around 25 other small shafts and mines were opened in the area. These establishments were selling coals locally, to nearby small-scale zinc smelters and ironworks.

==== Dębieńsko Coal Mine ====
In 1856, Czerwionka and Leszczyny gained railway connection to Rybnik and Katowice, which opened the area to cheaper iron, zinc and steel, undercutting the local industry. However, rapidly growing demand for coal in the Upper Silesian Industrial Region led to establishment of the Dubensko (later Dębieńsko) coal mine. In 1896, Vereinigte Königs- und Laurahütte corporation (owner of steelworks in Chorzów) bought rights to coal fields in Czerwionka area and opened the mine in on November 2, 1898. Three shafts were built and later deepened in 1899-1900, which allowed the mine to increase coal production from 4,010 tonnes in 1899 to 492,478 tonnes in 1912. In 1910, a dam with electricity generators has been built on the nearby Bierawka river to create a reservoir for the mine's use, and in 1913 a cocking facility has been built next to the mine.

The Dębieńsko Coal Mine has been a catalyst for a rapid population growth in Czerwionka and nearby villages. The coal mine built two housing estates for miners. First, the so-called Staro Kolonia (Old Colony) close to the mine, with director's villa, 14 8-family houses and a police station has been constructed along with the mine. Later, as the demand for workers could not be met by local population, a newer and larger housing estate called Familoki, with 96 houses of different sizes and shapes, have been constructed between 1902-1916. That later estate is now a tourist attraction and is under conservatorship.

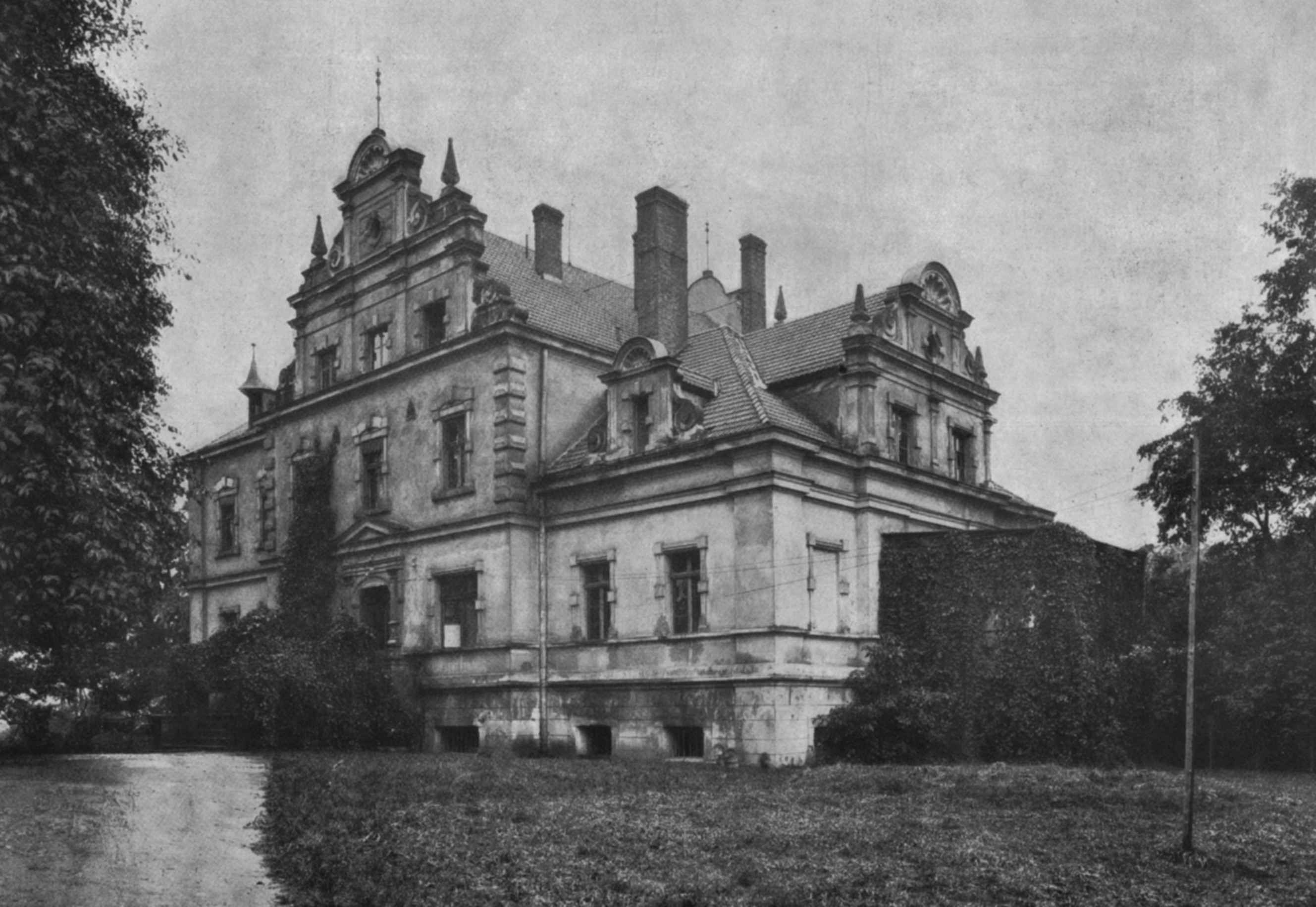
Czuchów Castle in c. 1906

=== 20th century ===
Following World War I, the area of modern Czerwionka-Leszczyny, along with all of Upper Silesia, found itself between Germany and newly-restored Poland. Under The Treaty of Versailles agreement, Upper Silesia was supposed to vote in a plebiscite whether it wants to stay in Germany or join Poland. The voting took place on March 20, 1921, and in the Czerwionka-Leszczyny area, the majority voted for Poland. The results per locality are shown in the table below

1921 Upper Silesian Plebiscite Results in modern Czerwionka-Leszczyny area
Locality	Votes for Germany	Votes for Poland	Total	Winner
Leszczyny-municipality	218	453	671	Poland
Leszczyny-estate	71	103	174	Poland
Czuchów	305	652	955	Poland
Czerwionka-municipality	355	292	647	Germany
Czerwionka-estate	498	713	1,311	Poland
Great Dębieńsko-municipality	217	341	558	Poland
Great Dębieńsko-estate	31	85	116	Poland
Old Dębieńsko	125	461	586	Poland
Total	1,820	3,100	4,920	Poland

Following the plebiscite and a disadvantageous division of Upper Silesia from the Polish point of view, local Poles started the Third Silesian Uprising, after which the Entente powers granted Poland more territory than previously planned, including all of modern Czerwionka-Leszczyny. The area belonged to the autonomous Silesian Voivodeship in the interwar period. In 1930s, the Great Depression took a heavy toll on the local mining industry, with as much as 25% if miners being on forced unpaid leave. The harsh economic conditions caused many people to involve in bootleg mining.

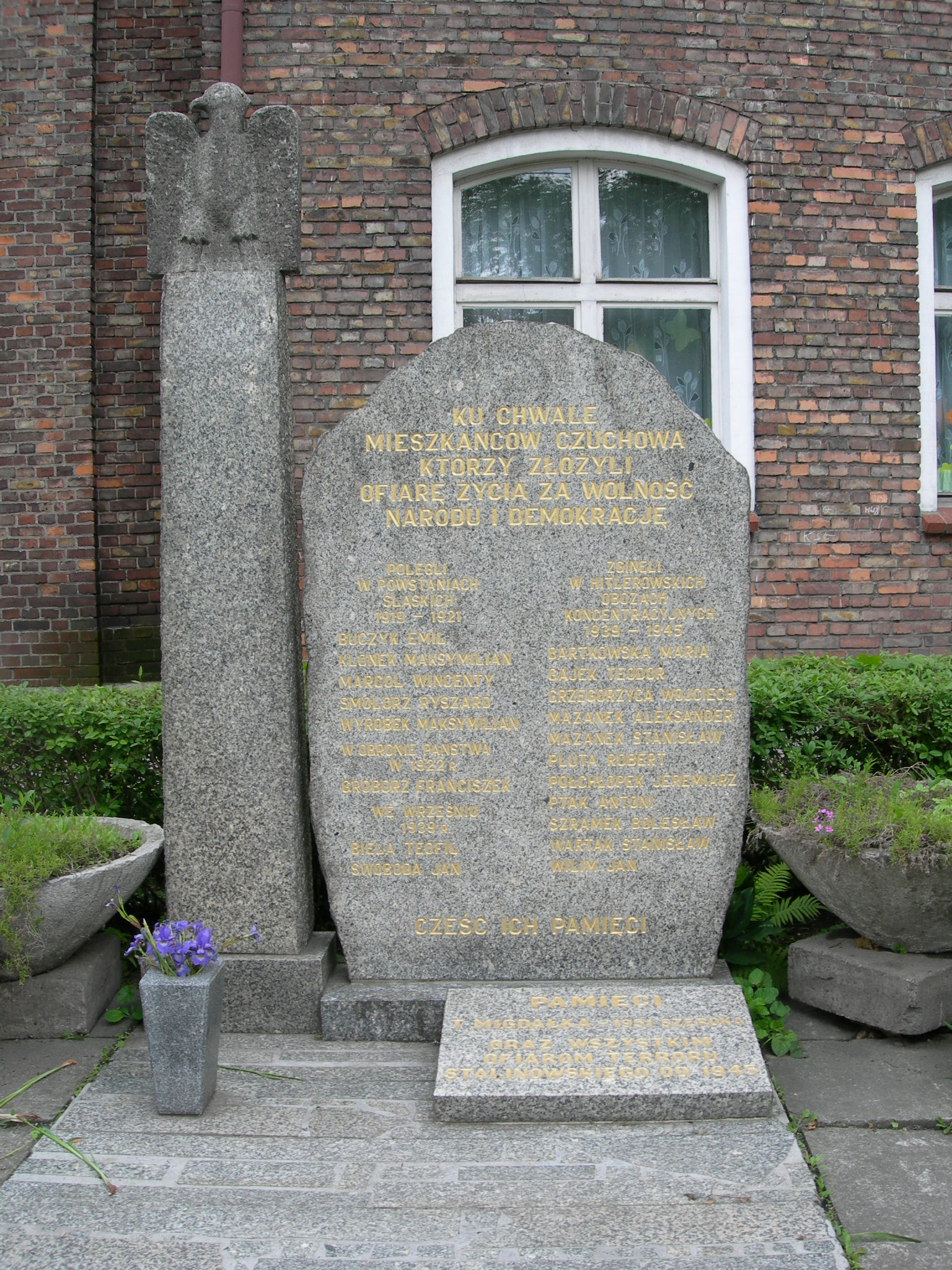
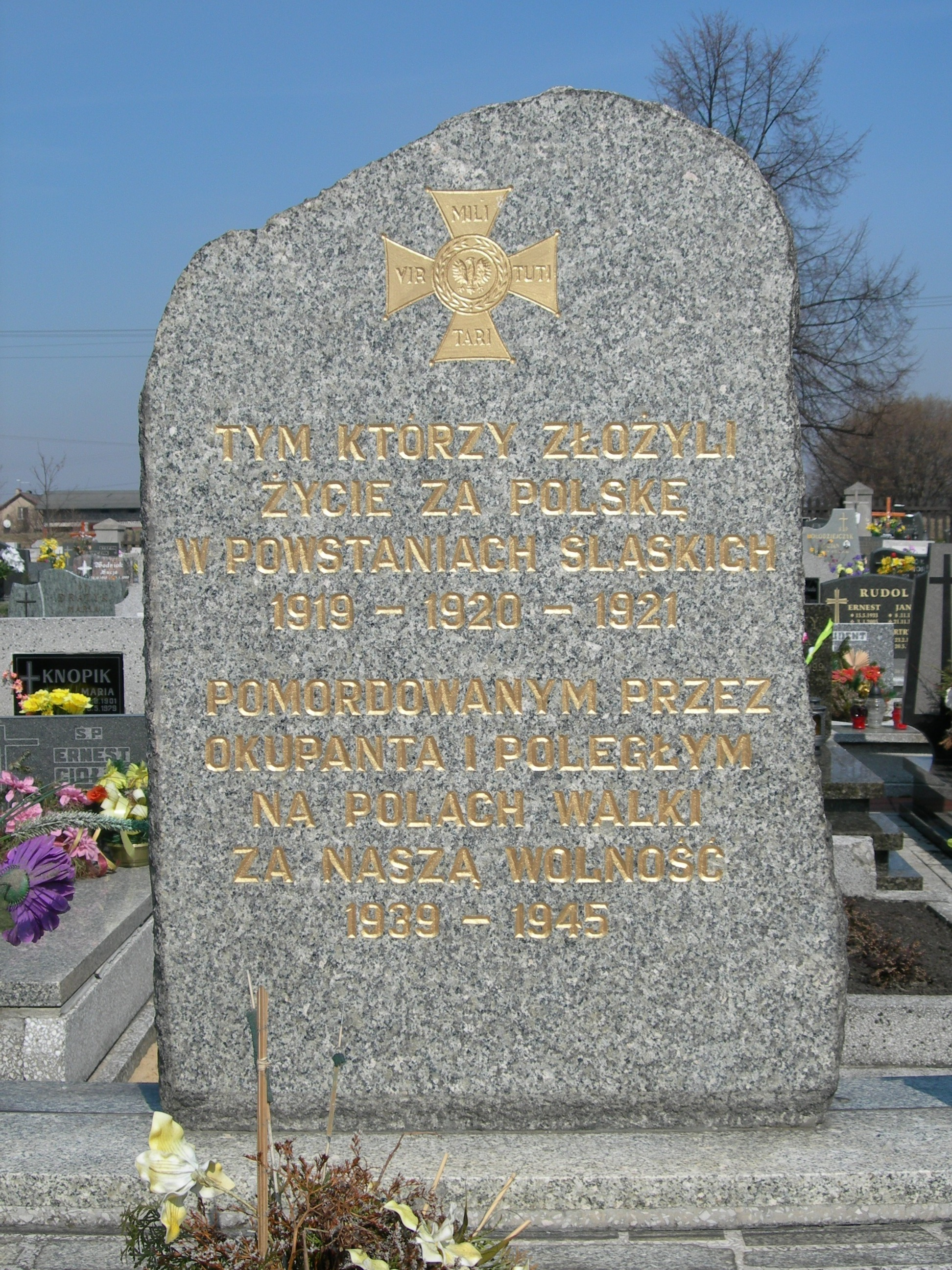
Memorials to local Poles who fell in the Silesian Uprisings or were killed or murdered by the occupiers during World War II

==== World War II ====
Following the German-Soviet invasion of Poland, which started World War II in September 1939, Czerwionka-Leszczyny was annexed into the Third Reich. While some locals, particularly members of the local intelligentsia such as teachers, clerks and clergy were rounded up and shoot or sent to concentration camps for their pro-Polish stance during the interwar period, most of the population enjoyed relative peace compared to other parts of Poland. In 1940, after expulsion of ethnic Poles to the General Government, the Nazis introduced the Deutsche Volksliste, a classification of desirability of the population in occupied western Poland. It divided people into four classes (1. Volksdeutcher - ethnic German, active in German minority before the war; 2. Deutschstämmige - ethnic German not active in German minority; 3. Eingedeutschte - native populations, considered by the Nazis to be partially polonized Germans; 4. Rückgedeutschte - fully polonized Germans or Poles who were deemed racially worthy or collaborated with the Reich). In Czerwionka-Leszczyny area, as in most of Upper Silesia, the vast majority were classified as category 3 and given conditional, 10-year German citizenship.

The local Polish police chief, another Polish policeman and a military officer from Czerwionka were murdered by the Russians in the Katyn massacre in 1940.

At the end of World War II, in late January 1945, one of the Death Marches from Auschwitz led through Leszczyny, where hundreds of prisoners were killed by the SS men: 447 near the train station and 288 in a field nearby.

==== After World War II ====
Czerwionka-Leszczyny area has been liberated by the Red Army on January 27, 1945. In the months immediately after the liberation, the Soviet military command and new Polish communist leadership deported many men to Donetsk Coal Area, Kazakhstan and Siberia to work as slave labor for the USSR, while others were incarcerated and often killed in camps such as Zgoda because the new government considered Silesians to be German.

In September 1945 the new communist government made coal the most strategic natural resource to the country, which heavily influenced development of the Upper Silesian region, including Czerwionka-Leszczyny, in the subsequent decades through massive investment into coal mining industry and scaling up productions and employment. In the early 1950s the construction of a large mining estate started in Leszczyny, pulling people from all across Poland to work in coal industry, and in the 1960s similar estates started to pop up in Czerwionka. This new influx of Poles caused an ethnic conflict with native Silesians in the 1960s and 70s, as natives saw new migrants as causing crime and public disorder, while the migrants considered migrants to be German and therefore not welcomed in Poland. In the 1970s and 1980s, many native Silesians emigrated to Germany through the family reunification scheme organized by both countries.

Growing population was reflected by changes in administrative status: in 1962 Czerwionka, Leszczyny and Czuchów were merged into a town under the name Czerwionka-Leszczyny. In 1975, the name of the town was changed to only Leszczyny for political reasons (Leszczyny was majority-Polish, while Czerwionka was majority-Silesian and had a history of voting for Germany in the plebiscite), and in 1977 Dębieńsko was annexed by the town, creating the modern-day Czerwionka-Leszczyny. Following the collapse of communism, in 1992 the name was changed back to Czerwionka-Leszczyny.

=== 1990s and 21st century ===
After the collapse of communism and return to the market economy, coal mining suffered from insufficient demand and rising costs against a government-regulated coal price, causing losses. Various restructuring programs in the 1990s alleviated the issue only partially, and by the end of 1990s it was clear the industry needs downsizing. The government of Jerzy Buzek adopted a plan which aimed at reducing employment in the industry through buy-outs and ultimately closing mines. In 1999, a list of mines to be closed was published, including Dębieńsko, and production ended on October 25, 2000. At the time of the closure, 2,400 people were employed at the mine, or which 1,300 were granted various forms of social welfare such as early retirement or buy-outs.

Since then, the town has re-oriented itself as a commuter town for nearby larger cities of Rybnik, Gliwice, Katowice and Żory.

== Demographics ==
Historical population
Year	Pop.	±%
1988	29,188	—
2002	28,941	−0.8%
2011	28,569	−1.3%
2021	27,683	−3.1%

Czerwionka-Leszczyny's population peaked in 1998 with 30,343 inhabitants and since then has been declining slowly. However, the population of the broader municipality has been on a steady rise, offsetting population loss within town limits. As of 2020, 27,888 people lived in the town, of which 4,648 (16.7%) were 14 or younger, 18,814 (67.5%) were 15-64, and 4,426 (15.8%) were 65 or older. This makes Czerwionka-Leszczyny relatively young compared to Poland as a whole, as countrywide only 15.4% of the population is 14 or younger while 18.6% is 65 or older.

In 2019, 308 babies were born in Czerwionka-Leszczyny while 336 people died, a natural loss of 28 people. This represents a shift in natural change patterns as in prior years, Czerwionka-Leszczyny noted natural increases: +6 in 2018, +70 in 2017, +41 in 2016. In 2019, 203 people moved to Czerwionka-Leszczyny from elsewhere in Poland and 4 moved from abroad, while 377 people moved away from Czerwionka-Leszczyny to elsewhere in Poland and 5 moved abroad. In total, the town lost 175 people to migration - a sharp increase from a loss of 56 in 2018, 64 in 2017 and 31 in 2016.

In 2019, neighborhood populations were as follows:

Czerwionka-Leszczyny population by neighborhood
Neighborhood	2019 population
Czuchów	3,808
Czerwionka	7,449
Dębieńsko	4,001
Leszczyny	11,284

== Economy ==
Since 1898, the town's main employer was the Dębieńsko coal mine, which was closed up in 2000, causing substantial job loss and unemployment. Employment in Czerwionka-Leszczyny municipality (the town and the surrounding villages) decreases from 8,434 in 1995 to 5,082 in 2000, achieving a low of just 3,784 in 2003. In Czerwionka-Leszczyny proper, it was 7,592, 3,971 and 3,111, respectively. Since then, the municipality succeeded in attracting outside investment and employment increased to 5,037 in 2019. As most of new investments are green fields, most of that growth happened in the rural part of the municipality, and the town itself had only 3,257 jobs as of 2019. Commuting has also helped ease the pressure on the job market. In 2006, 3,655 people from the town commuted to other localities for work (while 681 commuted to work in Czerwionka-Leszczyny). In 2016, these numbers have increased to 4,664 and 1,048, respectively.

Both new investments and increase in commuting resulted in dramatic decline in unemployment. In 2003 (earliest available data), there were 2,384 registered unemployed people in the municipality of Czerwionka-Leszczyny. In 2019, only 546 remained in that status.

== Twin towns – sister cities ==
See twin towns of Gmina Czerwionka-Leszczyny.
