= Rybnik County =

Rybnik County Powiat rybnicki
- County
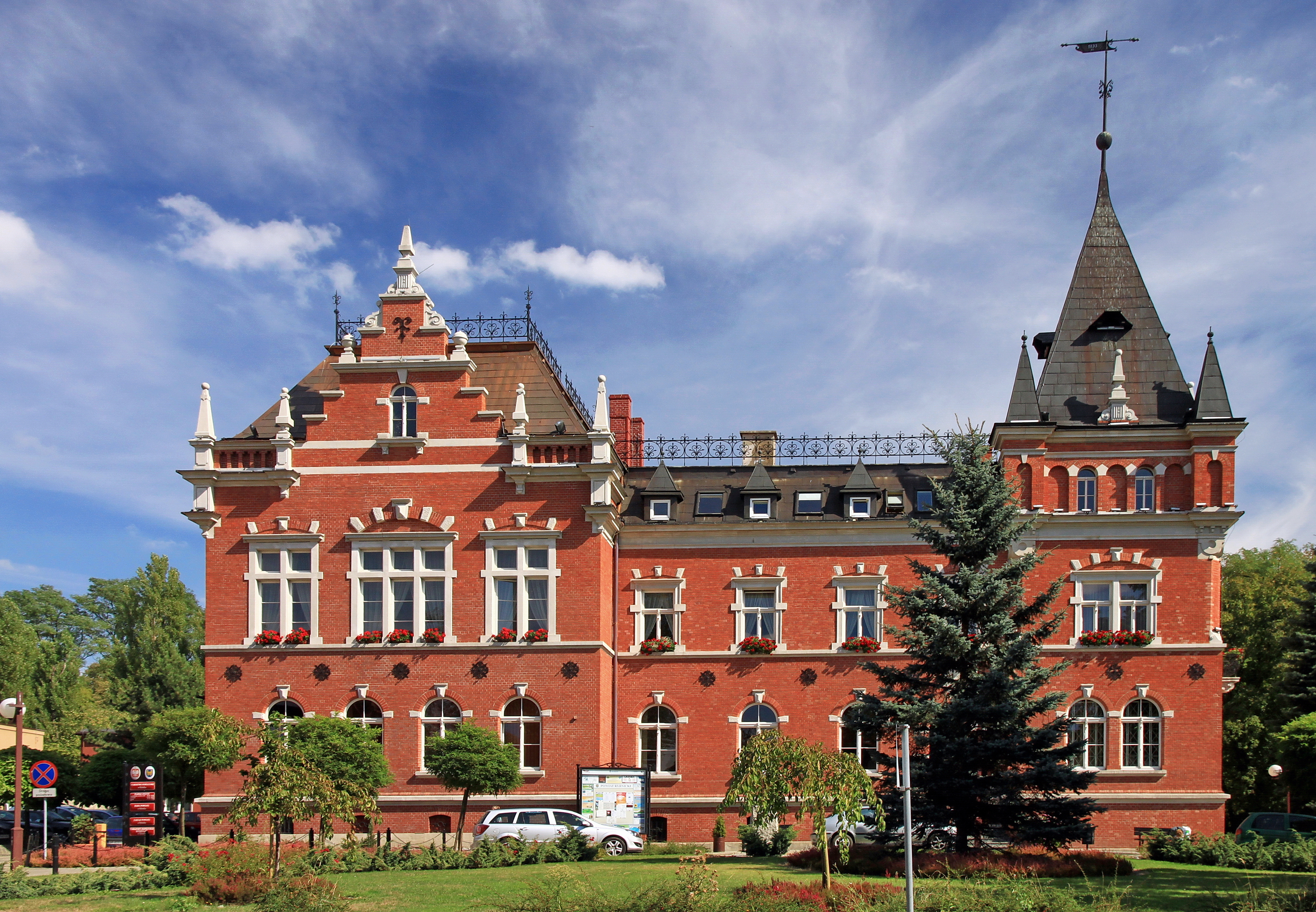
- Powiat office building, built in 1887

- Flag Coat of arms

- Location within the voivodeship

- Location in Poland
- Coordinates (Rybnik): 50°5′N 18°33′E
- Country: Poland
- Voivodeship: Silesian
- Seat: Rybnik
- Gminas: Total 5: Gmina Czerwionka-Leszczyny; Gmina Gaszowice; Gmina Jejkowice; Gmina Lyski; Gmina Świerklany

Area
  - Total: 224.63 km^{2} (86.73 sq mi)

Population (2019-06-30)
  - Total: 78,148
  - Density: 347.90/km^{2} (901.05/sq mi)
  - Urban: 28,156
  - Rural: 49,992
- Car plates: SRB
- Website: www.starostwo.rybnik.pl

Rybnik County (Polish: powiat rybnicki) is a suburban county in Silesian Voivodeship, southern Poland, created in 1999 as a result of Polish local government reforms. Its administrative seat is the city of Rybnik, although the city is not part of the county (it constitutes a separate city county). The county consists of three disjoint parts, separated by the city of Rybnik. In the past decade, Rybnik country experienced significant population growth, due to urban sprawl of adjacent cities.

At the 2002 census, the population was 72,926. As of 2019, the population was 78,148.

== History ==
Rybnik area was heavily influenced by the Cistercian in the Middle Ages. First Rybnik county was created in 1818 by the King of Prussia. It covered vast area, including current Racibórz, Gliwice, Mikołów and Wodzisław counties, as well as current city-county cities of Rybnik, Żory and Jastrzębie-Zdrój. Following First World War and the Upper Silesia plebiscite, most of that area became part of Poland. In 1975 administrative reforms repealed counties (powiaty) in Poland. In 1999 Jerzy Buzek government restored Rybnik county along with other counties.

== Geography ==
Rybnik county is located mostly on Rybnik Flatlands, with only the very west parts being part of Silesian Lowlands and the very east – Ramża Mountain – marking Silesian Upland. Three spoil tips in Czerwionka-Leszczyny are widely recognizable landmark of Rybnik county. Some part of the country is also incorporated into Rudy Landscape Park.

== Administrative divisions ==
Map of Rybnik County

The county is subdivided into five gminas (one urban-rural and four rural). These are listed in the following table, in descending order of population.

Gmina	Type	Area (km^{2})	Population (2019)	Seat
Gmina Czerwionka-Leszczyny	urban-rural	115.7	42,152	Czerwionka-Leszczyny
Gmina Świerklany	rural	24.2	12,445	Jankowice Rybnickie
Gmina Gaszowice	rural	19.5	9,755	Gaszowice
Gmina Lyski	rural	57.8	9,657	Lyski
Gmina Jejkowice	rural	7.6	4,139	Jejkowice

== Demographics ==
At the census of 2002 there were 72,926 people, 25,499 households and 20,362 families residing in the county. There were 18,026 married couples living together (12,675 of them had children), 210 partnerships (138 of them had children), 1,805 single mothers and 321 single fathers. The average household size was 2.84 and average family size was 3.33. There were 22,106 apartments in the county of average size of 78.0 square meters.

Rybnik county experiences consequent population growth. Between 2002 and 2011 the population grew by 4.3% making 76,094 citizens on March 31, 2011. On December 31, 2011, the population was estimated to be 76,367 (+0.4%).

== See also ==
- Silesia Euroregion
