= Studzienka Jankowicka =

Studzienka Jankowicka - A sacred place with the altar in honour of the Blessed Virgin Mary, the tomb of Father Valentine, the source of healing water and the hermit’s grotto. It is located in the wood between Marklowice and Jankowice. The history of Studzienka Jankowicka refers to historical events which are based on the folk tales concerning the Hussite wars and the history of Father Valentine killed by the Hussites in 1433.

== History ==
In 1433, penetrating (The Upper) Silesia, the Hussites reached Rybnik. They were slaughtering local people, plundering houses and burning everything that was within their sight, especially the symbols of Christianity. In those terrible times, a dying woman wanted the priest to come with the sacramental ministry. Her husband, ignoring the danger, that is, the prowling Hussites, decided to comply with her request. Ultimately, he managed to reach the church and there, he asked the rector for the sacramental ministry for his dying wife. Father Valentine, as a very saintly person, was sent to the woman’s house. He was a man of great faith, that is why he did not hide with his pious intentions. Therefore, the group of Hussites noticed him going with The Holy Sacrament. They were only waiting for an opportunity to profane the symbol of Christianity. Father Valentine noticed the Hussites dashing towards him but he was not afraid of losing his life, he only wanted to protect the Holy Sacrament from insulting. He found an oak and therein a big, spacious hollow. On the spur of the moment, he put there The Sacred Host. Delighted with his act of heroism, Father Valentine started to worry about his life, but it was already too late. The Hussites caught up with him and inflicted truly martyr’s death. The man was observing this incident from the distance, and as soon as the Hussites went away, he buried the body of the heroic priest. After some time, when the Hussites left Silesia, people began to emerge from their hiding places. The rumour about the heroic priest spread among neighbouring villages and in the place where he was buried, the source of crystal clear water (which later proved to be healing water) ejaculated. Since then, pilgrimages of believers began to head there. According to the folk tales, there were thousands of people who were healed thanks to this water. Years passed, but nobody knew where Father Valentine had hidden The Holy Sacrament. Until one day, some shepherds noticed the brightness over the oak. They informed about this the neighbouring people and priests, and The Sacred Host was found. People associated this fact with the death of Father Valentine. The rector of that time put the cross there to commemorate those events. Since then, the wood, in which the cross and the source of healing water is settled, has been a place of numerous pilgrimages.

== Architecture of Studzienka Jankowicka and the chronological outline ==
1433 – Father Valentine was murdered – In the place of his tomb, the source of crystal clear water ejaculated – the commemorative cross was built

1895 – the chapel in the honour of The Blessed Virgin Mary was built (often compared to the sanctuary in Lourdes) – the then priest of Jankowice parish – Edward Bolik, made a promise that if he recovers from serious illness, he will build a chapel in Studzienka

The Chapel consists of the altar, above it, there is the cross and the three-metre-high statue of The Blessed Virgin Mary called by people of Jankowice – The Holy Virgin from Studzienka, and the statue of Bernadette (the girl, who saw The Blessed Virgin in Lourdes)

Similarities to the sanctuary in Lourdes:

- statues of The Blessed Virgin Mary and Bernadette

- the healing water

In 1932-1935 the grotto was built, the chapel was enlarged and two side-chapels were added. In the main chapel, the sculpture of The Blessed Virgin and the sculpture of kneeling Bernadette are settled. In the left-side chapel, we can see the statue of Father Valentine – the tomb of the priest, and the right-side chapel is devoted to another version of The Blessed Virgin surrounded by angels. The architecture of Studzienka is also enriched by two grottos: one of the Saint Barbara – patron of miners and the other - the so-called grotto of the unemployed. Within the sanctuary, the Stations of the Cross, the wooden cross, and benches for pilgrims can be found.

Until 1949 and after 1956 Studzienka was the favourite place for Saturday-Sunday picnics

After 1957 – religious ceremonies took place in Studzienka

After 2001 – Studzienka was renovated

== The hermit ==
Before the Second World War, the hermit – Izydor Mirek, lived in Studzienka (precisely, in one of its grottos). In the public opinion, he was an extremely pious and kind man. He was tidying up there and leading the prayers during pilgrimages. He donated a bell from money he received from pilgrims.

The war period and the Communist era did not encourage the cultivation of the sanctuary.

== See also ==
- Jankowice Rybnickie

== Bibliography ==
1. Norbert Niestolik, Zabytki Jankowic Na Tle Dziejów Wsi, Zarząd Gminy Świerklany, Rybnik - Jankowice 1996, ISBN 83-906453-0-0

2. Sylwester Banko, Historia Janowickiej Studzienki, Marklowice 2001

3. Ewa Wysocka, Historia Sanktuarium Bożego Ciała w Jankowicach, Katowice 1995
