= Moravia–Ostrava offensive =

Offensive of the Soviet Army during World War II

- Part of the Eastern Front of World War II
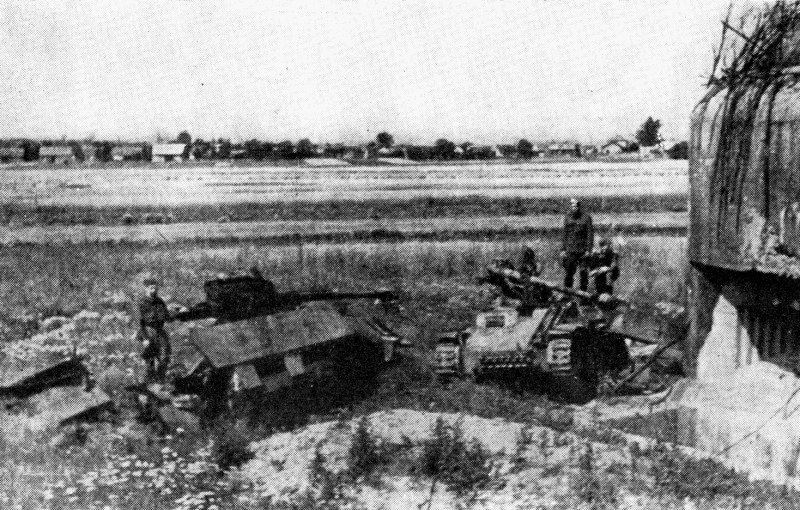
Date	10 March – 6 May 1945
Location	Upper Silesia (Poland), Moravia, Czechoslovakia
Result	Soviet victory

Belligerents
Germany (Kingdom of Hungary (1920–1946)) Hungary	Soviet Union; Czechoslovakia

Commanders and leaders
(Nazi Germany) Ferdinand Schörner (Nazi Germany) Gotthard Heinrici (Nazi Germany) Walther Nehring	(Soviet Union) Ivan Petrov (Soviet Union) Andrey Yeryomenko

Casualties and losses
(Nazi Germany) : 250,000 killed, wounded, or captured 4,000 guns, 1,570 mortars, 1,087 tanks and assault guns, and 737 aircraft destroyed or captured (Kingdom of Hungary (1920–1946)) : Unknown	(Soviet Union) : 23,960 killed 88,660 wounded (Czechoslovak government-in-exile) : 1,528 killed or wounded

The Moravia–Ostrava offensive operation (Russian: Моравско-Остравская наступательная операция) was an offensive by the Red Army during World War II that lasted from March 10 to May 6, 1945, and was the Soviet conquest of present-day Eastern Czech Republic (Moravia also part of Polish and Czech Silesia). Bohuslav Křenek

== Prelude ==
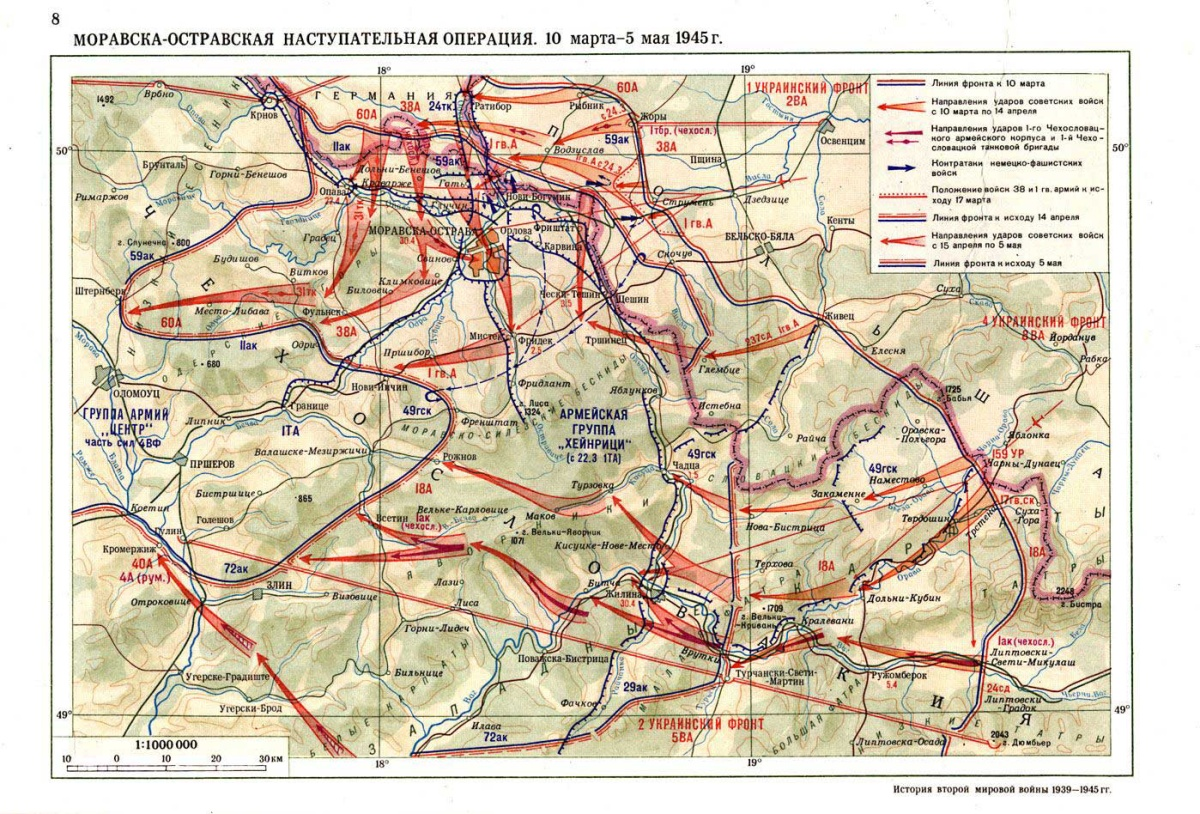
Moravian-Ostrava operation

In the spring of 1945, the frontline on the southwestern border of Lesser Poland ran from Wieliczka via Jaworzno and Gliwice to Międzylesie.

The 4th Ukrainian Front (Colonel General Ivan Petrov) and the right wing of the southern 2nd Ukrainian Front (Rodion Malinovsky) were far behind the other fronts of the Red Army. On the western part of the High Tatras, a frontal arch had formed, covering the northeastern and southeastern borders of Slovakia. The 4th Ukrainian Front, located in front of the western Carpathian ridge and between Dukla and Kaschau, had 317,300 men, 2,900 guns and mortars, 184 tanks and self-propelled guns and 416 aircraft at the beginning of March 1945.
The enemy Army group Heinrici (German 1st Panzer Army and 1st Hungarian Army), under command of Gotthard Heinrici counted over 150,000 men, 1,500 guns and mortars, 100 tanks and 120 aircraft.

== The Battle ==
=== First offensive on March 10 ===
On March 10, the offensive of the 4th Ukrainian Front began with the 38th Army (General Kirill Moskalenko) from Pszczyna and Černá Voda area. The Red Army was able to advance only 3–4 km on the first day of the attack. By the evening of March 17, the German defense had been pushed back on a 15 km wide front about 6–12 km deep. The operational targets had not been reached, but the losses were considerable. When the offensive of the 60th Army (Colonel General Pavel Kurochkin) of the 1st Ukrainian Front against the German XI Army Corps near Racibórz was successful, the focus was shifted to the right wing of the front.

=== Second Offensive on March 24 ===
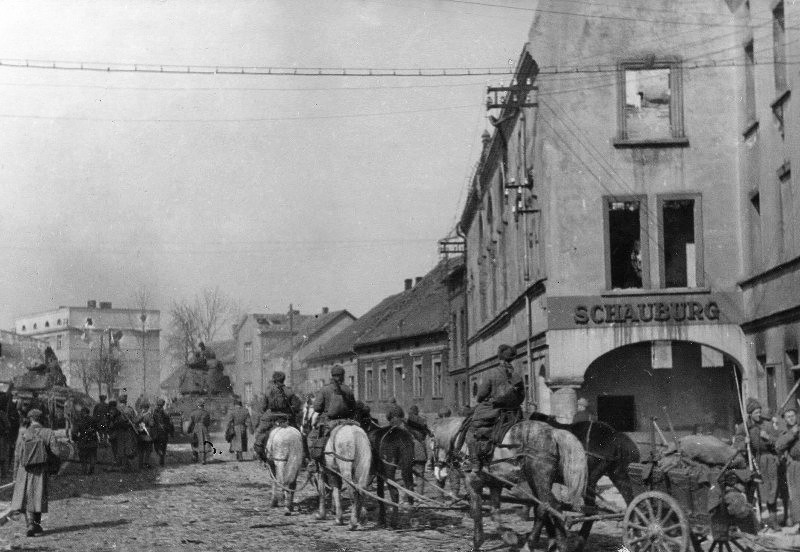
Troops of the 4th Ukrainian Front passing through Zorau, 9 April 1945

On 24 March, the 4th Ukrainian Front began the new major offensive. The South Upper Silesian and North Moravian industrial area was now attacked from the north and east at the same time. The 38th Army attacked the front of the German LIX. Armeekorps (General of the Infantry Ernst Sieler) from the area around Sohrau towards Loslau. On the first day the German defensive lines were successfully broken through and an area of 20 km width and 7 km depth was conquered. A fast-tracked counter-attack by the German 8th and 19th Panzer Divisions near Loslau could not restore the situation. On 26 March, after a hard battle the positions at Loslau were lost. The troops of the 60th Army and the 1st Guard Army (Andrei Grechko) were able to bring closer towards Bohumín.

Army General Andrey Yeryomenko, appointed as the new commander of the 4th Ukrainian Front on March 26, had the units of the 38th Army attack again on March 27. His troops were able to penetrate another 5 km deep and approach the Oder at Bukau at a distance of 2 to 3 km. On April 2, the 95th and 126th Rifle Corps near Rogau managed to cross the Oder and form a bridgehead. At the same time, the 11th Rifle Corps crossed the river at Tworkau. In the east, the Soviet 18th Army was able to overcome the positions on the Tatras and take Ružomberok. Until April 5, however, the incursion of the 1st Guards and the 18th Army towards Frankstadt, which has now been extended to a depth of 20 km, could not be extended due to increasing German resistance. On 6 April, the 60th Army of Jeremenko's Front, which had previously been subordinated to the 1st Ukrainian Front, was placed under the direction of the 4th Ukrainian Front. The 1st Czechoslovak Army Corps (General Ludvík Svoboda, from 3 April General Karel Klapálek) was transferred to the 18th Army (Lieutenant General Anton Gastilovich) and was able to distinguish itself on 4 April by liberating Liptovský Mikuláš.

The Stavka then changed the further operational plan to the southwest towards Olomouc, because the possibility was offered to cut off the 1st Panzer Army. The aim of the Soviet offensive was to cut off its connection with the German 17th Army (General of the Infantry Friedrich Schulz). Field Marshal Ferdinand Schörner moved five German divisions to reinforce the threatened positions of the 1st Panzer Army in the Opava area. At that time, the Germans still were able to attack the Soviets and counterattacked near the village south of Loslau.

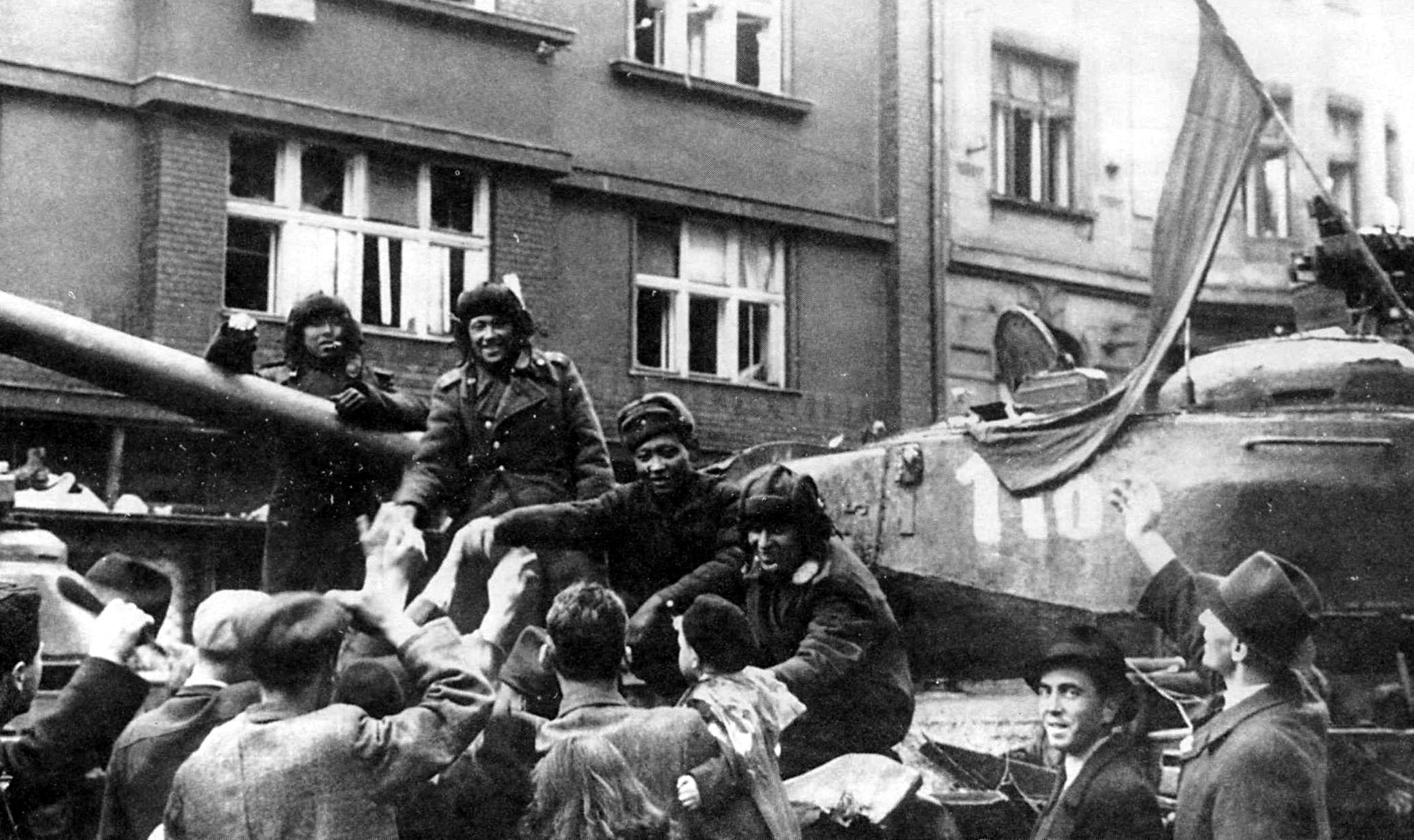
Residents of Ostrava greet Soviet tankers of the 38th Army's 42nd Separate Guards Tank Brigade, 1 May

On April 22, Opava fell to the 60th Army, and on April 30, Ostrava fell into the hands of the 38th Army, making the positions of the German XXXXIX. Mountain Corps (78th, 320th Infantry 3rd and 4th Mountain Division) untenable. The 17th Guard Rifle Corps (Lieutenant General Nikifor Medvedev) of the Soviet 18th Army, which is still standing in the east, was finally able to force the German LXXII Army Corps to retreat from the northern Váh section and occupy Žilina on 30 April. The 1st Panzer Army immediately began with the retreat towards Olomouc in order to avoid encirclement. On May 6, Šternberk and the approaches to Olomouc fell into Soviet hands. Soviet troops occupied the Moravian Ostrava industrial area and created the conditions for the advance into the central areas of Czechoslovakia.

== Casualties ==
The Red Army lost 112,620 men (23,960 killed and 88,660 wounded). Over 5,000 Soviet soldiers were buried in the cemetery in Wodzisław Śląski. The 1st Czechoslovak Army Corps lost 1,528 killed or wounded between 12 April and 18 April during the offensive. Germany suffered 250,000 casualties, 150,000 of which were captured while the rest were either killed, wounded or missing.

== Sources ==
- This is a translation of an article in the German Wikipedia, Mährisch-Ostrauer Operation.
- Hojka, Piotr (2011), Wodzisław Śląski i ziemia wodzisławska w czasie II wojny światowej, Museum of Wodzisław Śląski, ISBN 978-83-932793-0-2
