= Gogołowa =

- Village
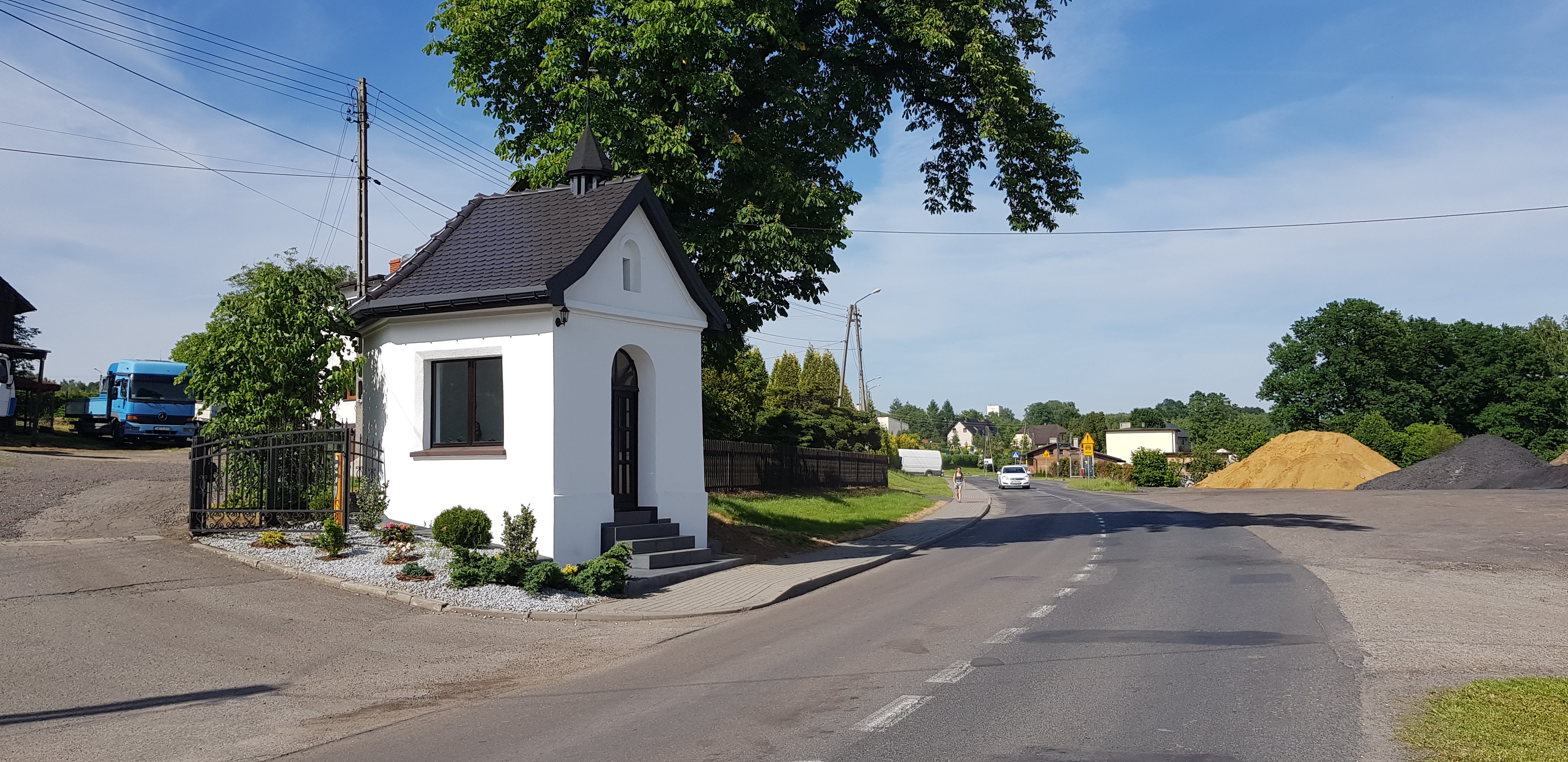

- Location within Poland
- Coordinates: 50°0′N 18°36′E
- Country: Poland
- Voivodeship: Silesian
- County: Wodzisław
- Gmina: Mszana
- Population: 1,027

Gogołowa [ɡɔɡɔˈwɔva] is a village in the administrative district of Gmina Mszana, within Wodzisław County, Silesian Voivodeship, in southern Poland.

== Climate ==
In December, January, and February, winter temperatures are mostly low, around 0°C or slightly lower, while high temperatures range from approximately 0°C to 2°C.

In summer (June, July, and August), high temperatures reach approximately 20°C to 25°C, while nighttime temperatures remain moderate, around 10°C to 15°C.

In general, the climate is mild during the day in the summer, and cold to very cold at night in the winter.
