= Grabówka, Wodzisław County =

Grabówka
- Village
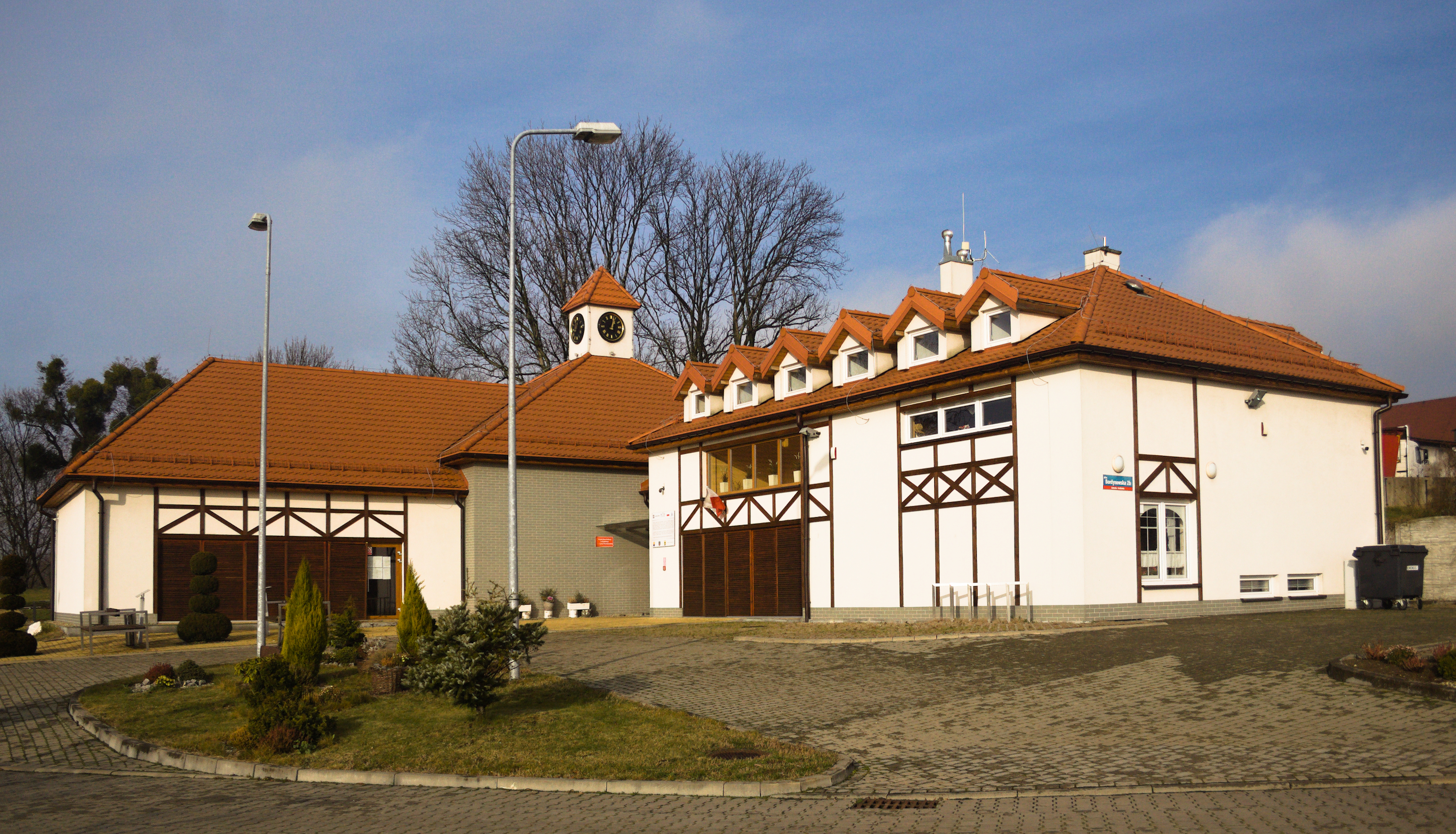

- Location within Poland
- Coordinates: 50°1′31″N 18°18′48″E
- Country: Poland
- Voivodeship: Silesian
- County: Wodzisław
- Gmina: Lubomia
- Population: 207

Grabówka [ɡraˈbufka] is a village in the administrative district of Gmina Lubomia, within Wodzisław County, Silesian Voivodeship, in southern Poland.
