= Trawniki, Silesian Voivodeship =

Trawniki
- Village
- Location within Poland
- Coordinates: 50°2′17″N 18°16′10″E
- Country: Poland
- Voivodeship: Silesian
- County: Wodzisław
- Gmina: Lubomia
- Time zone: UTC+1 (CET)
  - Summer (DST): UTC+2 (CEST)
- Vehicle registration: SWD

Trawniki [travˈniki] is a village in the administrative district of Gmina Lubomia, within Wodzisław County, Silesian Voivodeship, in southern Poland.

== Etymology ==
The name of the village is of Polish origin and comes from the word trawnik, which means "lawn".
