= Połomia, Wodzisław County =

Połomia
- Village
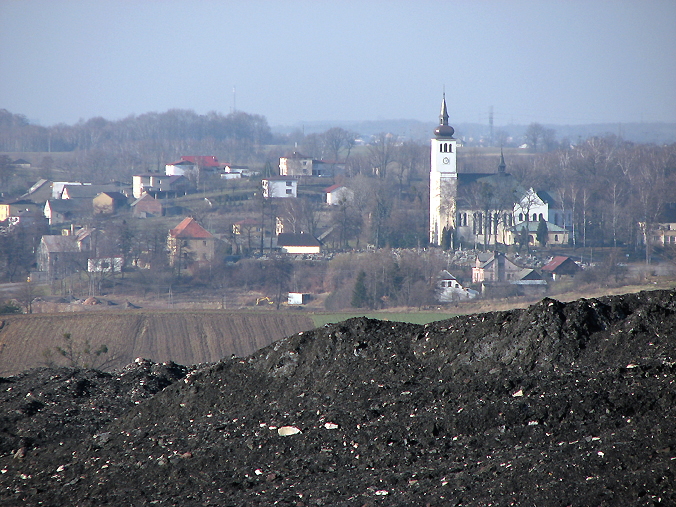

- Location within Poland
- Coordinates: 49°59′24″N 18°33′19″E
- Country: Poland
- Voivodeship: Silesian
- County: Wodzisław
- Gmina: Mszana
- Population: 2,300

Połomia [pɔˈwɔmja] is a village in the administrative district of Gmina Mszana, within Wodzisław County, Silesian Voivodeship, in southern Poland.
