= Gmina Marklowice =

Gmina Marklowice Marklowice Commune
- Gmina
- Flag Coat of arms
- Interactive map of Gmina Marklowice
- Coordinates (Marklowice): 50°1′6″N 18°31′29″E
- Country: Poland
- Voivodeship: Silesian
- County: Wodzisław
- Seat: Marklowice

Area
  - Total: 13.76 km^{2} (5.31 sq mi)

Population (2019-06-30)
  - Total: 5,396
  - Density: 392.2/km^{2} (1,016/sq mi)
- Website: http://www.marklowice.pl

Gmina Marklowice is a rural gmina (administrative district) in Wodzisław County, Silesian Voivodeship, in southern Poland. Its seat is the village of Marklowice, which lies approximately 6 kilometres (4 mi) east of Wodzisław Śląski and 43 km (27 mi) south-west of the regional capital Katowice.

The gmina covers an area of 13.76 square kilometres (5.3 sq mi), and as of 2019 its total population is 5,396.

== Neighbouring gminas ==
Gmina Marklowice is bordered by the towns of Radlin, Rybnik and Wodzisław Śląski, and by the gminas of Mszana and Świerklany.

== Twin towns – sister cities ==
Gmina Marklowice is twinned with:

- Barlin, France
