= Ligota Tworkowska =

- Village
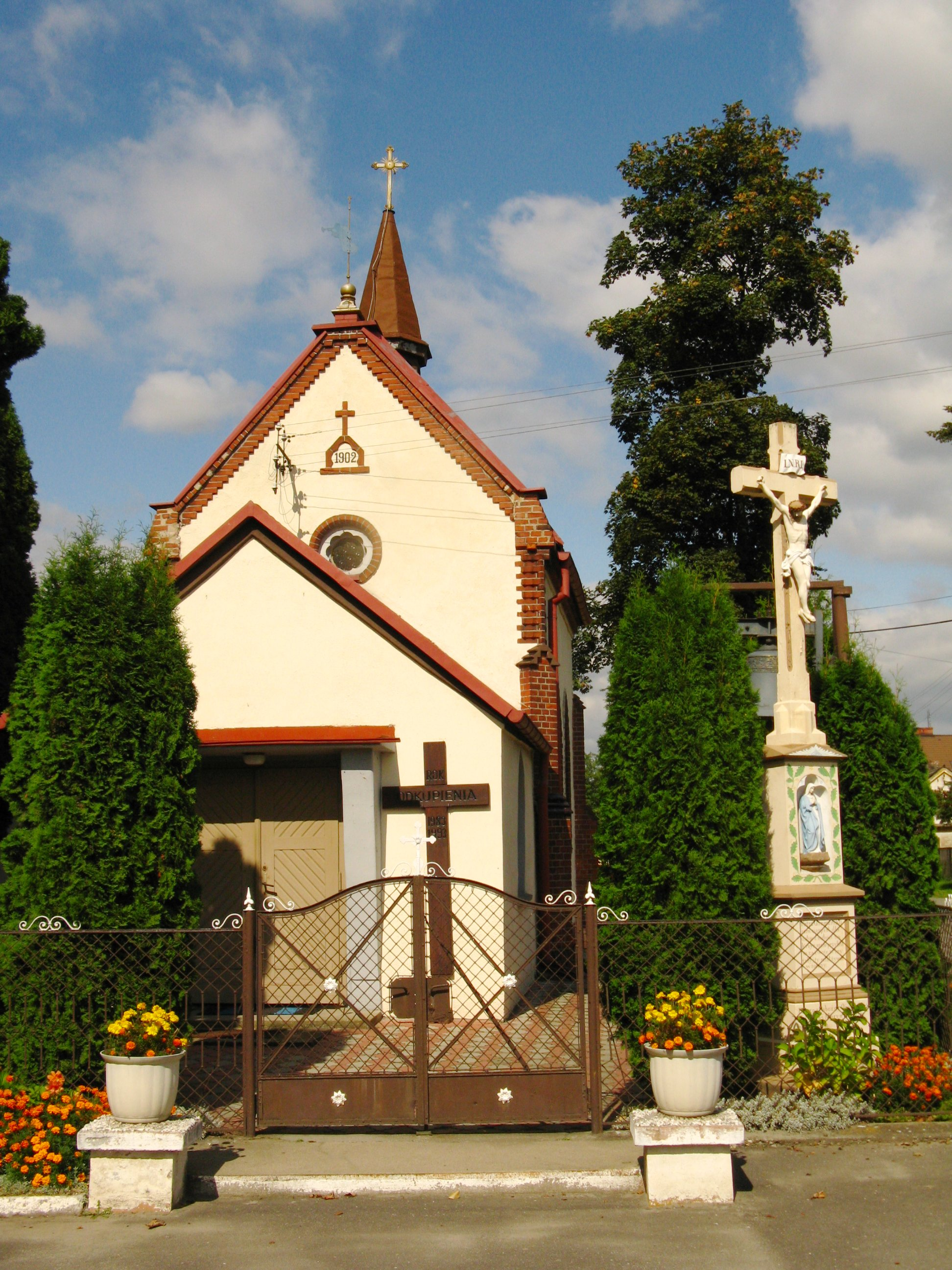
- A local Catholic church

- Location within Poland
- Coordinates: 50°1′N 18°16′E
- Country: Poland
- Voivodeship: Silesian
- County: Wodzisław
- Gmina: Lubomia
- Population: 145

Ligota Tworkowska [liˈɡɔta tfɔrˈkɔfska] is a village in the administrative district of Gmina Lubomia, within Wodzisław County, Silesian Voivodeship, in southern Poland.

== History ==
For a long period, Ligota Tworkowska was linked with Tworkow as an estate. During the 16th century, it changed ownership several times, and in 1643, it came into the possession of Stanislaw von Reiswic. On April 27, 1841, Ligota Tworkowska, along with Bukow and other villages, was acquired by Count Jan Gustaw von Saurma-Jeltsch. During the interwar period, an outpost of the First Line Border Guard "Ligota" was stationed in the village. From 1975 to 1998, it was administratively part of the Katowice Voivodeship.

Since 2007 in the process of liquidation due to the construction of the Racibórz Reservoir, as the entire village is to be part of a polder and in case of a flood is to be flooded by the artificial lake Racibórz Dolny.
