= Nowy Dwór, Wodzisław County =

Nowy Dwór
- Village
- Location within Poland
- Coordinates: 50°3′12″N 18°15′20″E
- Country: Poland
- Voivodeship: Silesian
- County: Wodzisław
- Gmina: Lubomia

Nowy Dwór [ˈnɔvɨ ˈdvur] is a village in the administrative district of Gmina Lubomia, within Wodzisław County, Silesian Voivodeship, in southern Poland.
