= Pszów =

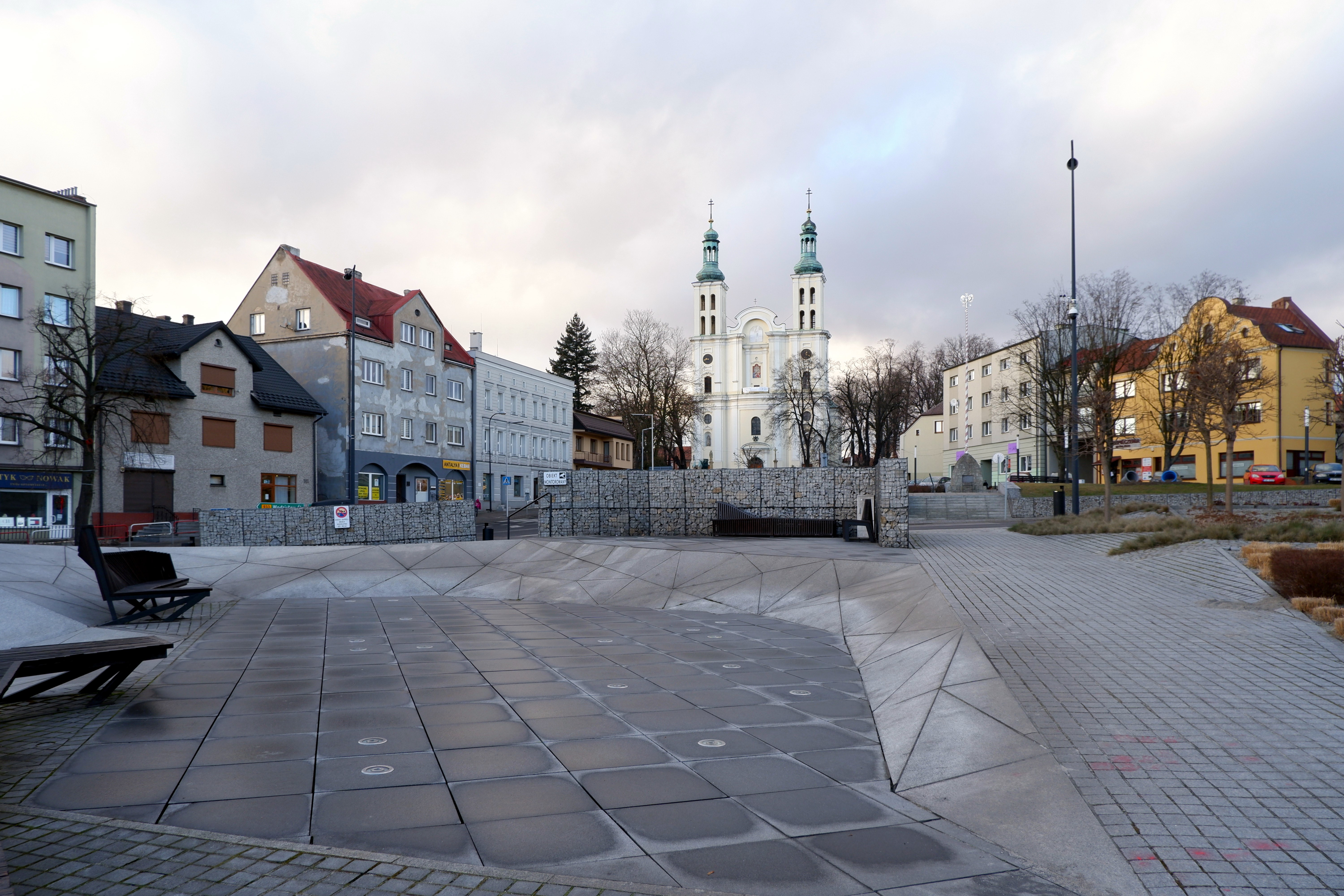
- Main square and the Basilica of the Nativity of the Virgin Mary

- Flag Coat of arms

- Location within Poland
- Coordinates: 50°3′N 18°24′E
- Country: Poland
- Voivodeship: Silesian
- County: Wodzisław
- Gmina: Pszów (urban gmina)
- First mentioned: 1265

Government
  - Mayor: Czesław Krzystała

Area
  - Total: 20.42 km^{2} (7.88 sq mi)
- Elevation: 311 m (1,020 ft)

Population (2019-06-30)
  - Total: 13,896
  - Density: 680.5/km^{2} (1,763/sq mi)
- Time zone: UTC+1 (CET)
  - Summer (DST): UTC+2 (CEST)
- Postal code: 44-370
- Car plates: SWD
- Website: http://www.pszow.pl

Pszów [pʂuf] is a town in Wodzisław County, Silesian Voivodeship, in southern Poland, with 13,896 inhabitants (2019). It is located on Rybnik Plateau (Płaskowyż Rybnicki), in close vicinity to such cities, as Rybnik, Wodzisław Śląski, Racibórz, Radlin, Rydułtowy, Jastrzębie-Zdrój and Żory. With the area of 20.42 square kilometres (7.88 sq mi).

== History ==
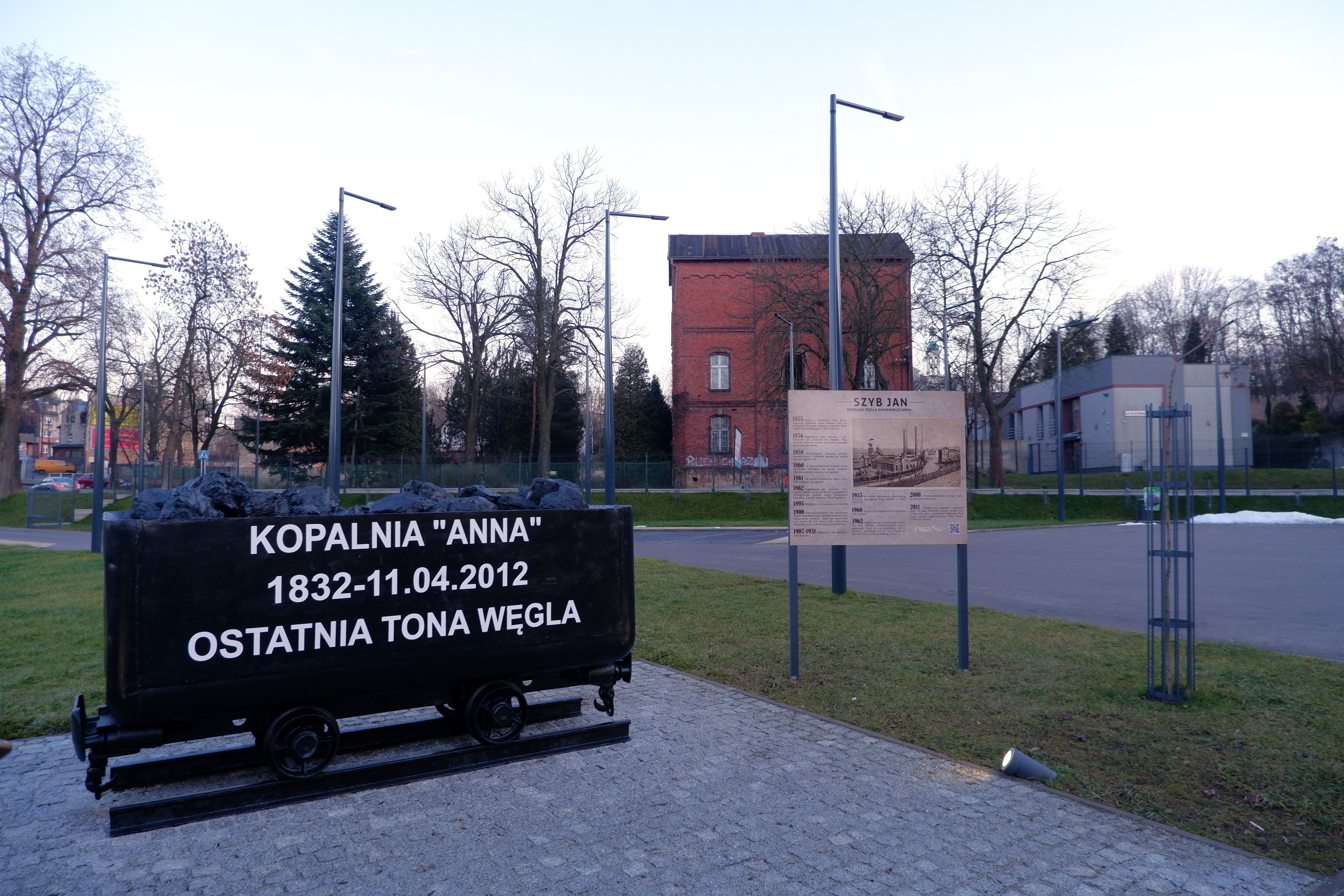
Memorial to the closed Anna Coal Mine

First mention of Pszów comes from 1265, when, called then Psov, it was granted Magdeburg rights. The first wooden church was built in the town in 1293. Across the centuries, Pszów shared the fate of Upper Silesia, belonging to Kingdom of Poland, Kingdom of Bohemia, Habsburg monarchy, Kingdom of Prussia, and German Empire. Following the Silesian Uprisings, in 1922 Pszów became part of Second Polish Republic.

Following the joint German-Soviet invasion of Poland, which started World War II in September 1939, it was occupied by Germany until 1945. From September 1942 to November 1943, the occupiers operated a Polenlager forced labour camp for Poles expelled from the region.

Incorporated as a town in 1954, it now is a part of the Rybnik Coal Area. Coal Mine Rydułtowy-Anna is located on the territory of Pszów and Rydułtowy. Between 1975 and 1994, Pszów was a district of Wodzisław Śląski.

On April 13, 2025 five people were killed and twelve others were injured in a fire at an illegal hostel.

== Sport ==
Pszów has one sport club – Górnik Pszów, founded in 1924. It is most famous for boxers, such as Andrzej Biegalski, Bogdan Gajda (gold medal at 1977 European Amateur Boxing Championships), and Zbigniew Kicka (bronze medal at 1974 World Amateur Boxing Championships).

== Twin towns – sister cities ==
Pszów is twinned with:

- Horní Benešov, Czech Republic

== People ==
- Julius Szmula (1829-1909), German politician, member of German Reichstag
