= Upper Silesian Ethnographic Park =

Open-air museum in Chorzów, Poland

Coordinates: 50°17′40.1″N 18°58′12.4″E

- Górnośląski Park Etnograficzny
- Location: Chorzów, Poland
- Type: Open-air museum (Skansen)
- Collection size: 25 hectares

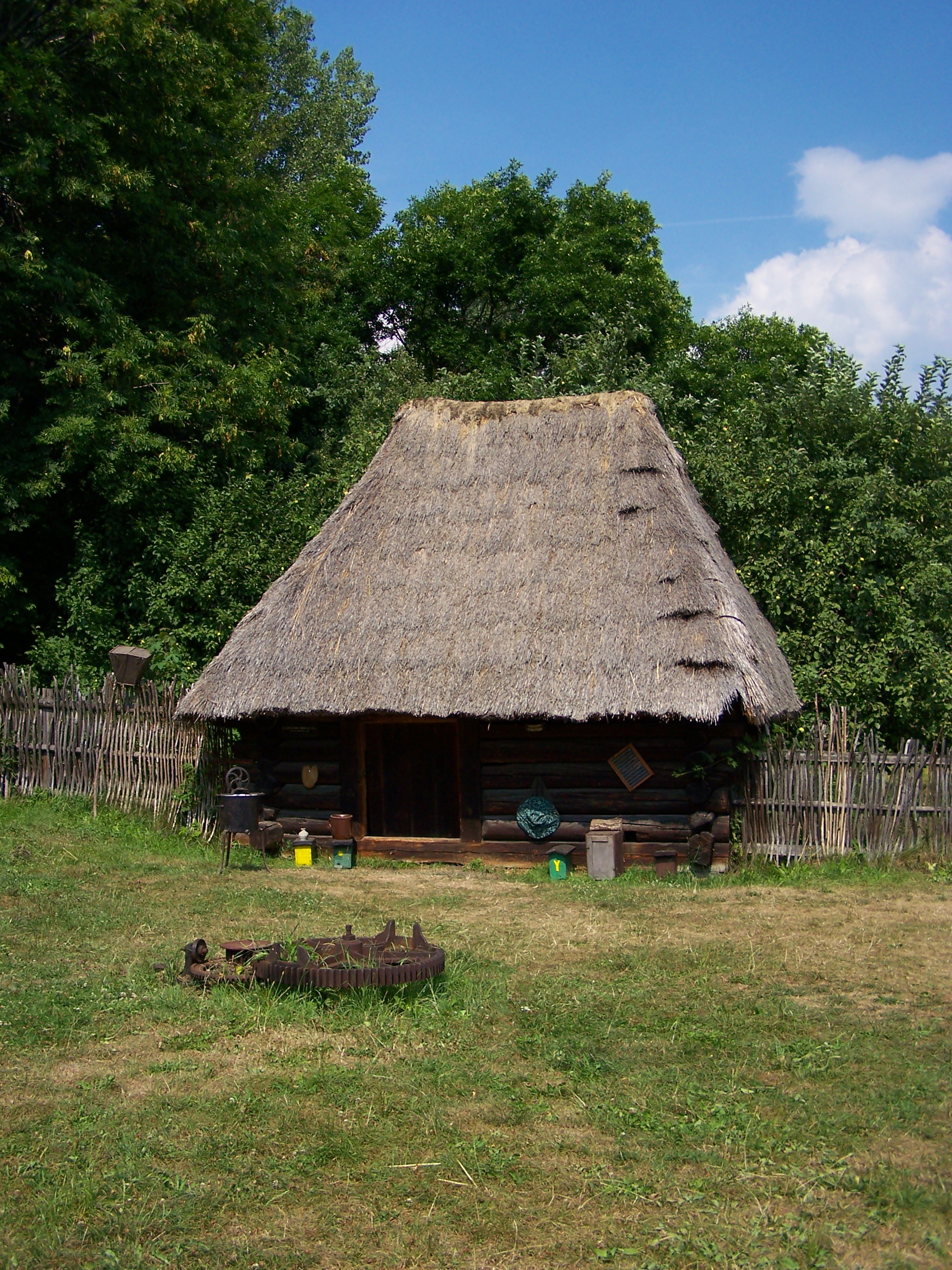
Shed on hay from Kobiór in Upper Silesian Ethnographic Park

The Upper Silesian Ethnographic Park (Polish: Górnośląski Park Etnograficzny) is an open-air museum in Chorzów, Poland. It is referred to as a skansen, stemming from the first open-air museum of its kind, the Skansen in Stockholm, Sweden. The area of the park is 25 hectares.

The museum presents a range of agricultural buildings from all over Silesia. Amongst those are cottages from the Beskids, farmsteads from the Pszczyna region, a wooden church from Nieboczowy dating from the 18th century, and a large number of buildings and artifacts from Istebna in Cieszyn Silesia.

== Gallery ==
Playing trembita

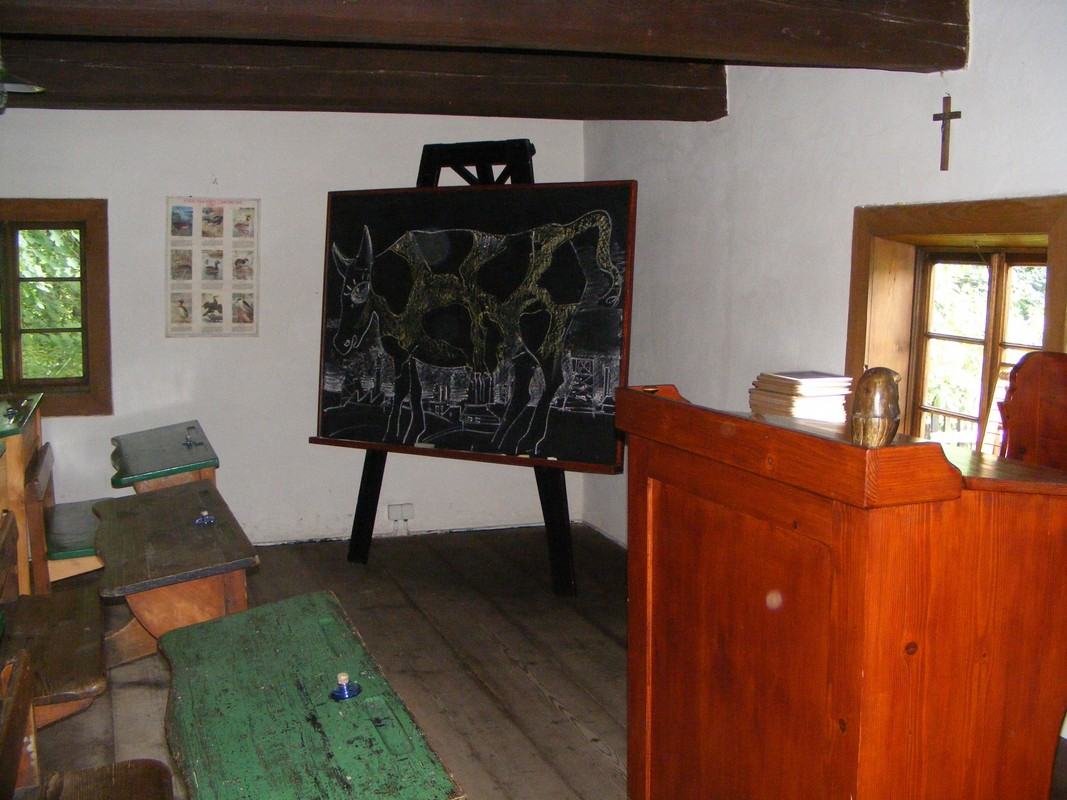
School building
