= Syrynia =

- Village
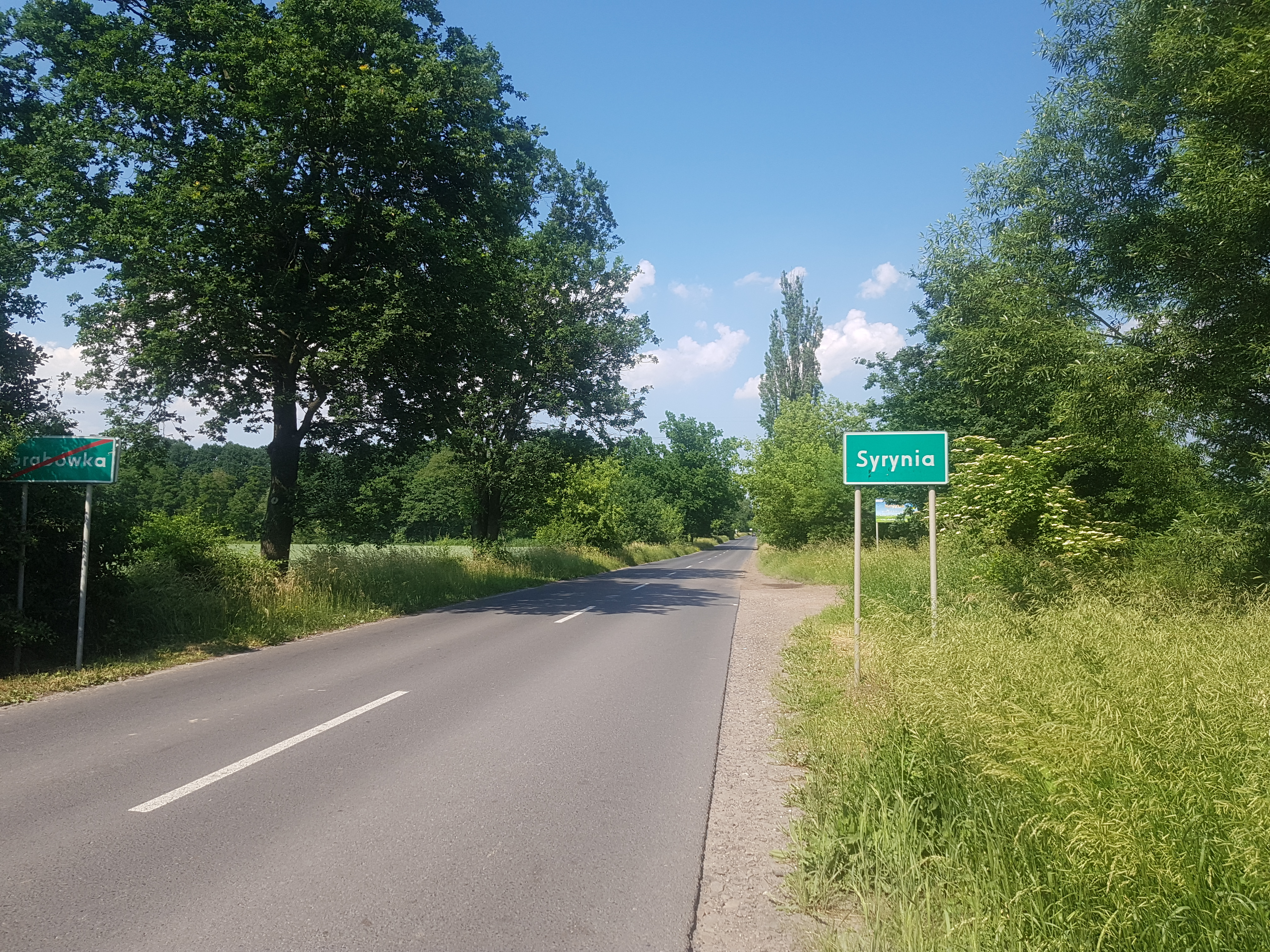

- Location within Poland
- Coordinates: 50°1′N 18°21′E
- Country: Poland
- Voivodeship: Silesian
- County: Wodzisław
- Gmina: Lubomia
- Population: 3,247

Syrynia [sɨˈrɨɲa] is a village in the administrative district of Gmina Lubomia, within Wodzisław County, Silesian Voivodeship, in southern Poland.
