= Gmina Lubomia =

Gmina Lubomia Lubomia Commune
- Gmina
- Flag Coat of arms
- Interactive map of Gmina Lubomia
- Coordinates (Lubomia): 50°2′N 18°18′E
- Country: Poland
- Voivodeship: Silesian
- County: Wodzisław
- Seat: Lubomia

Area
  - Total: 41.83 km^{2} (16.15 sq mi)

Population (2019-06-30)
  - Total: 7,925
  - Density: 189.5/km^{2} (490.7/sq mi)
- Website: http://www.lubomia.pl

Gmina Lubomia is a rural gmina (administrative district) in Wodzisław County, Silesian Voivodeship, in southern Poland. Its seat is the village of Lubomia, which lies approximately 12 kilometres (7 mi) west of Wodzisław Śląski and 56 km (35 mi) south-west of the regional capital Katowice.

The gmina covers an area of 41.83 square kilometres (16.2 sq mi), and as of 2019, its total population was 7,925.

== Villages ==
Gmina Lubomia contains the villages and settlements of Buglowiec, Buków, Grabówka, Ligota Tworkowska, Lubomia, Nieboczowy, Nowy Dwór, Syrynia and Trawniki.

== Neighbouring gminas ==
Gmina Lubomia is bordered by the towns of Pszów, Racibórz and Wodzisław Śląski, and by the gminas of Gorzyce, Kornowac and Krzyżanowice.

== Twin towns – sister cities ==
Gmina Lubomia is twinned with:

- Horní Suchá, Czech Republic
