= Buglowiec =

- Settlement
- Location within Poland
- Coordinates: 50°0′49″N 18°19′42″E
- Country: Poland
- Voivodeship: Silesian
- County: Wodzisław
- Gmina: Lubomia

Buglowiec [buˈɡlɔvjɛt͡s] is a settlement in the administrative district of Gmina Lubomia, within Wodzisław County, Silesian Voivodeship, in southern Poland.
