= August Sternickel =

Executed German serial killer

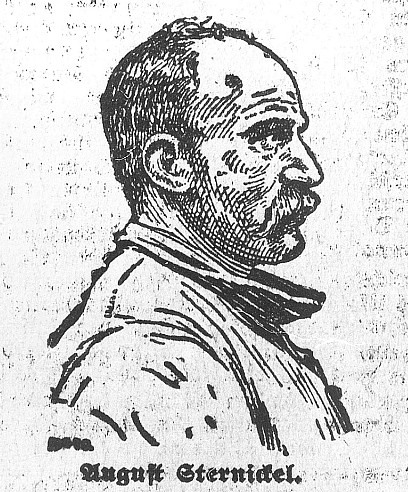
- Born: 11 May 1866; Mschanna, German Empire (present-day Mszana, Poland)
- Died: 30 July 1913 (aged 47); Frankfurt an der Oder, German Empire
- Cause of death: Execution by beheading
- Other name: Otto Schöne
- Conviction: Murder x4
- Penalty: Death

Details
- Victims: 7
- Span of crimes: 1905–1913
- Country: Germany
- State: Silesia
- Date apprehended: 1913

August Sternickel (11 May 1866 – 30 July 1913) was a German criminal, arsonist and serial killer. Between 1905 and 1913 he committed various arsons of farmhouses and several murders across the German Empire for which he earned notoriety, leading to his crime spree being referred to by locals as The Sternickel Horror. Even after his execution, Sternickel remained the subject of numerous murder ballads and newspapers reports.

== Life ==
August Sternickel was born on 11 May 1866, in Mschanna (present-day Mszana, Poland), the son of a baker. As an adult he mastered the trade of a miller, earning money as a journeyman and servant. Using his eloquence and handsome appearance, August became engaged to the daughter of a wealthy family in the Oderbruch area, pretending to be the son of a manor owner. Sternickel claimed that he was looking to buy a manor for himself, but because of an alleged short-term liquidity platform he turned to his fiancée's father and asked for a loan of 3,000 gold marks. After the father had asked third parties about Sternickel and received negative feedback about him, the engagement was broken off, with August evading criminal prosecution. He would, however, later serve minor prison sentences for other schemes.

Following his release, property crimes followed, ranging from burglarizing homes to theft, for which he was again sent to a house of correction. His last recorded sentence was for theft, served in Neisse, and after serving it out, he went to Berlin, where he worked as a casual worker. Finally, he embarked on a life as a migrant worker.

== First murder ==
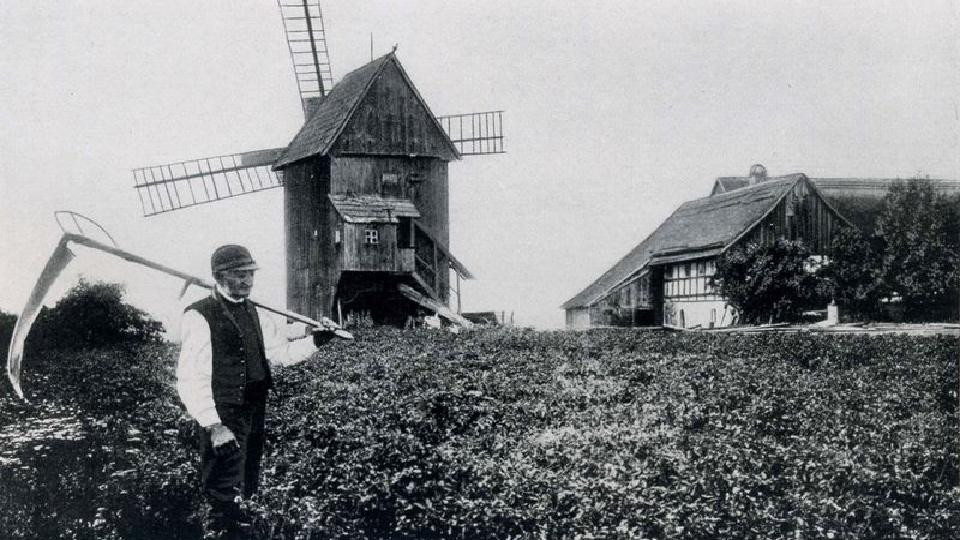
Mr. Knappe and the mill

In 1905, Sternickel came to Plagwitz (today Płakowice in Gmina Lwówek Śląski) finding a job with Mr. Knappe, a mill owner. The mill was well-known, as there had been heavy fighting between the French and Russian forces around Plagwitz during the 1813 campaign.

With the help of two accomplices, the brothers Reinhold and Wilhelm Pietsch, he robbed and murdered Mr. Knappe. In order to cover up the act, Sternickel set the mill on fire, destroying it on the night of 8 to 9 July 1905. The corpse, however, could still be found under the rubble, with clear evidence that he had been killed in a homicidal manner.

It was relatively clear that Sternickel had committed the crime, but by then, he had disappeared. While an investigation by Berlin authorities was unsuccessful in capturing him, his accomplices were arrested. On 20 October 1910, the Pietsch brothers were tried at the Hirschberg Regional Court, with both of them claiming that August was the main perpetrator. Reinhold was found guilty of robbing but not killing the miller, for which he received a 10-year prison sentence. His brother Wilhelm was acquitted due to a lack of evidence.

== Fugitive ==
Between 1905 and 1913, Sternickel evaded capture by the Kriminalpolizei, surviving by working as an agricultural worker and occasionally as a journeyman, using false identities. He was a diligent and hard-working employee, particularly exemplary in dealing with animals entrusted to him.

Since people who led lifestyles similar to Sternickel's were already viewed by authorities as considerable security risks, comprehensive reporting and identification requirements for police surveillance systems were gradually introduced. Despite some logistical problems, they were eventually more refined and comprehensive with time. Despite lacking proper papers for identification, Sternickel benefitted from the fact that during the harvest season, workers were needed and employers often didn't ask questions.

From testimonies, it was later concluded that Sternickel committed three murders during this period: against the widow Krause in 1909, the cotton farmer Knöting in 1910, and the hay farmer Winckler in 1912.

== Final murder ==
In October 1912, Franz Kallies, the owner of an approximately 60-acre estate near Ortwig, hired August, who was using the alias "Otto Schöne," as a farmhand. In addition to managing his estate, Kallies also ran a branch of a nearby savings bank. Sternickel proved to be a good worker, treating the animals in a good manner. The farmer noticed, however, that his new employee was often absent for days and refused to present him with any identification or tell him where he went. While he was absent one day, Franz decided to rummage through his belongings to find any papers, an act which was later noticed by Sternickel. According to his later testimony, it was at this moment that he decided to take revenge on his employer. While at a hostel in Müncheberg, Sternickel approached a group of young men (20-year-old Georg Kersten, his 18-year-old brother Willy, and 21-year-old Franz Schliewenz) and asked whether they could "do him a favour," to which they agreed. In accordance with their plan, the three of them went to Kallies' farm early in the morning, where they proceeded to strangle him with a string. When the 16-year-old maid Anna Phillip entered shortly after to milk the cows, she too was overwhelmed and strangled. All of them then went to the main building, where they proceeded to kill Kallies' wife. They woke up the couple's two daughters, whom they threatened with a gun, and forced them to tell where the cash box was. After they found it, Sternickel divided up the loot, giving each of his accomplices 100 gold marks.

== Execution ==
During the last few days before his execution, Sternickel wrote his memoir, not allowing himself to be disturbed while doing so. In a 1930 report from The Monthly Magazine for Criminal Psychology and Law Reform, the report claimed that after he had taken a bath, August dressed himself in a nice suit and later gave a funny speech to the crowd which had gathered. On 30 July 1913, he was beheaded by executioner Lorenz Schwietz at Frankfurt an der Oder.

== See also ==
- List of German serial killers

== Literature ==
- Maximillian Jacta, A clever capital criminal - The case of August Sternickel, in: Berühmte Strafprozesse, Band Deutschland II, Goldmann-Verlag, München 1967, S. 200–214 (in German)
