= Buków, Silesian Voivodeship =

Buków
- Village
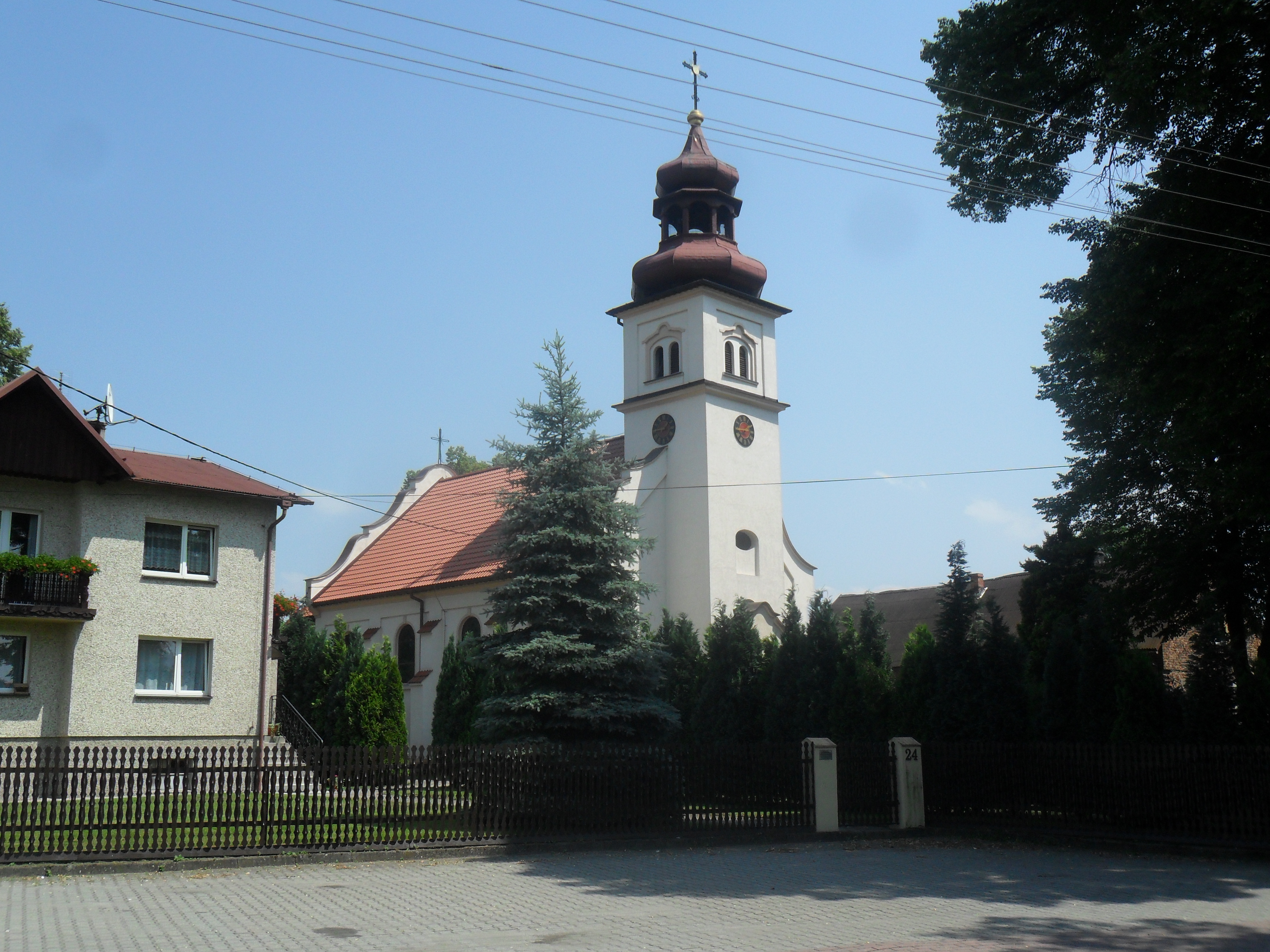
- A local Catholic church

- Location within Poland
- Coordinates: 50°0′6″N 18°17′16″E
- Country: Poland
- Voivodeship: Silesian
- County: Wodzisław
- Gmina: Lubomia
- Population: 176

Buków [ˈbukuf] is a village in the administrative district of Gmina Lubomia, within Wodzisław County, Silesian Voivodeship, in southern Poland.
