= Gmina Świerklany =

Gmina Świerklany Świerklany Commune
- Gmina
- Coat of arms
- Interactive map of Gmina Świerklany
- Coordinates (Jankowice Rybnickie): 50°2′N 18°33′E
- Country: Poland
- Voivodeship: Silesian
- County: Rybnik
- Seat: Jankowice Rybnickie

Area
  - Total: 24.17 km^{2} (9.33 sq mi)

Population (2019-06-30)
  - Total: 12,445
  - Density: 514.9/km^{2} (1,334/sq mi)
- Website: https://www.swierklany.pl/

Gmina Świerklany is a rural gmina (administrative district) in Rybnik County, Silesian Voivodeship, in southern Poland. Its seat is the village of Jankowice Rybnickie, which lies approximately 6 kilometres (4 mi) south of Rybnik and 41 km (25 mi) south-west of the regional capital Katowice. Until 1999 its seat was Świerklany Górne.

The gmina covers an area of 24.17 square kilometres (9.33 sq mi), and as of 2019 its total population is 12,445.

== Villages ==
Gmina Świerklany contains the villages and settlements of Jankowice Rybnickie, Michałkowice (part of Jankowice Rybnickie), Świerklany Dolne ("Lower Świerklany") and Świerklany Górne ("Upper Świerklany").

== Neighbouring gminas ==
Gmina Świerklany is bordered by the towns of Jastrzębie-Zdrój, Rybnik and Żory, and by the gminas of Marklowice and Mszana.

== Twin towns – sister cities ==
Gmina Świerklany is twinned with:

- Enying, Hungary
