= Nieboczowy =

- Village
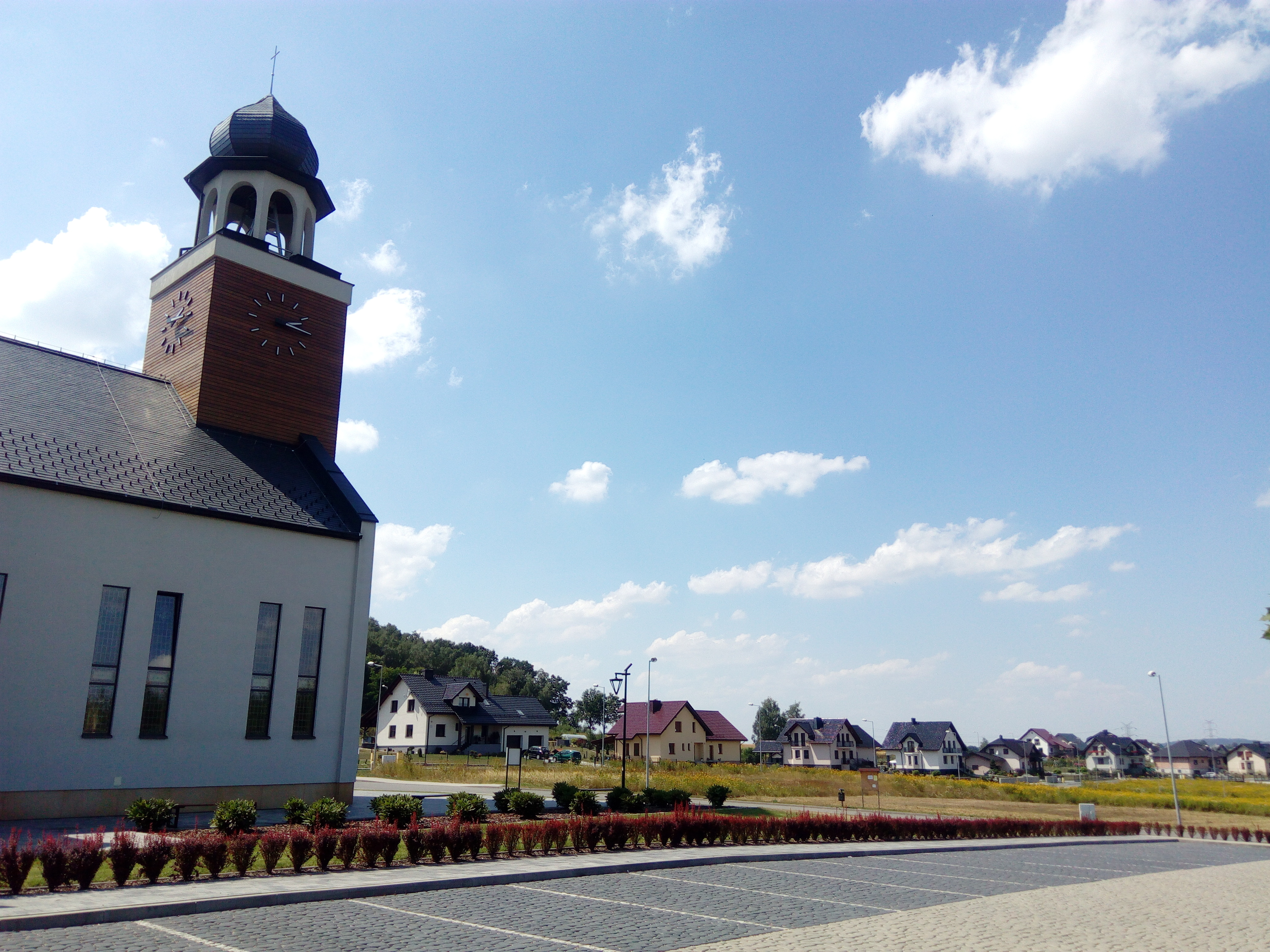
- A local Catholic church

- Location within Poland
- Coordinates: 50°2′N 18°15′E
- Country: Poland
- Voivodeship: Silesian
- County: Wodzisław
- Gmina: Lubomia
- Population: 550
- Website: nieboczowy.pl

Nieboczowy [ɲɛbɔˈt͡ʂɔvɨ] (German Niebotschau) is a village in the administrative district of Gmina Lubomia, within Wodzisław County, Silesian Voivodeship, in southern Poland.

The original village with 550 inhabitants was demolished between 2013 and 2017 due to the risk of flooding similar to that of the flood in 1997. The area of the former village was then used for the construction of the Racibórz Dolny detention basin. A new village was built near the village of Syrynia.
