= Mszana =

- Village
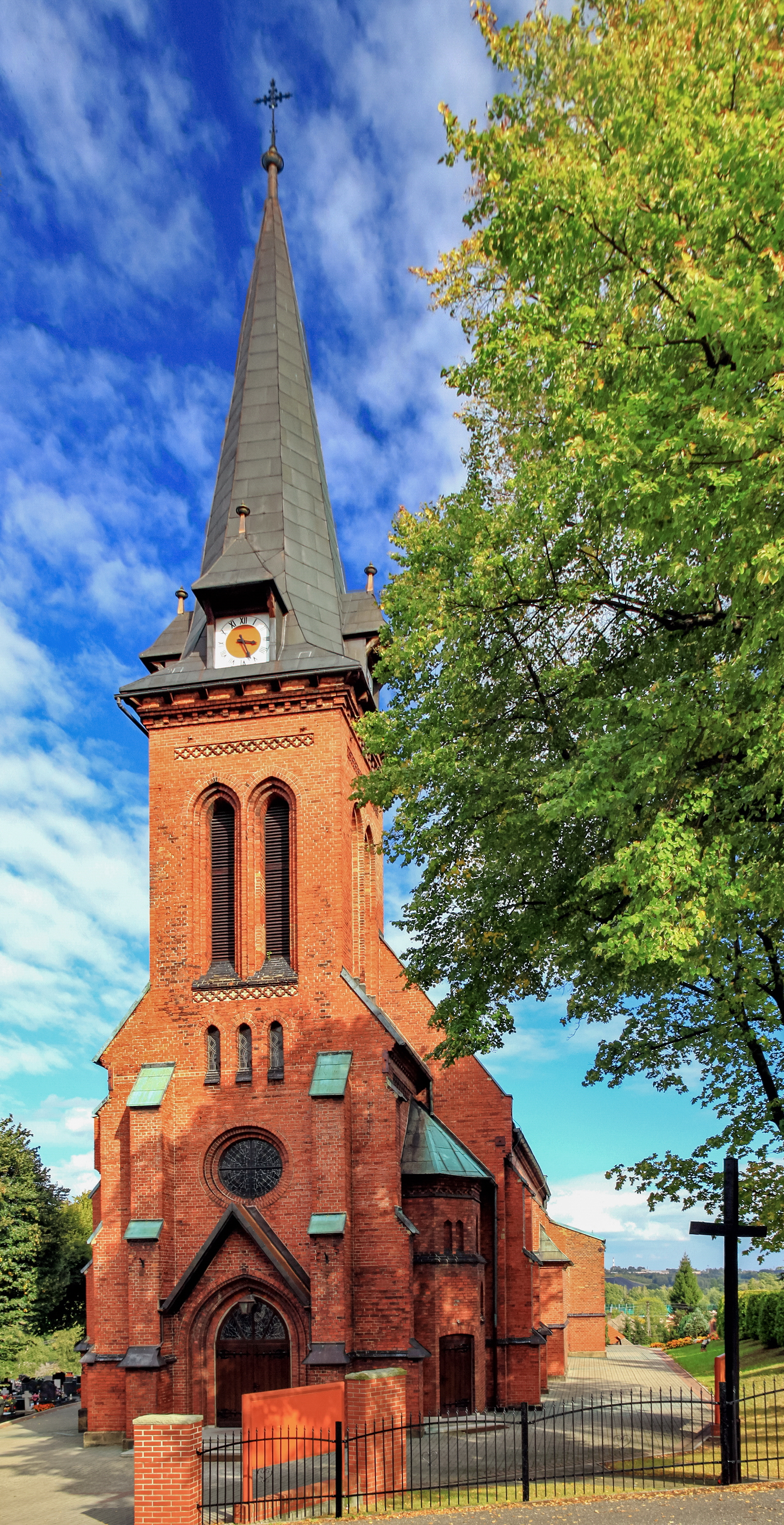
- St. George church

- Location within Poland
- Coordinates: 49°58′9″N 18°30′56″E
- Country: Poland
- Voivodeship: Silesian
- County: Wodzisław
- Gmina: Mszana
- First mentioned: 1305
- Highest elevation: 280 m (920 ft)
- Lowest elevation: 230 m (750 ft)
- Population: 3,559
- Website: http://www.mszana.ug.gov.pl

Mszana [ˈmʂana] is a village in Wodzisław County, Silesian Voivodeship, in southern Poland. It is the seat of the gmina (administrative district) called Gmina Mszana.

The village was first mentioned in a Latin document of Diocese of Wrocław called Liber fundationis episcopatus Vratislaviensis from around 1305 as item in Msana debent esse triginta mansi.

== Notable people ==
- August Sternickel - criminal and serial killer
