= Michałkowice, Rybnik County =

Michałkowice
- Settlement
- Location within Poland
- Coordinates: 50°2′N 18°34′E
- Country: Poland
- Voivodeship: Silesian
- County: Rybnik
- Gmina: Świerklany

Michałkowice [mixau̯kɔˈvit͡sɛ] is a settlement in the administrative district of Gmina Świerklany, within Rybnik County, Silesian Voivodeship, in southern Poland.
