= Gmina Mszana =

Gmina Mszana Mszana Commune
- Gmina
- Flag Coat of arms

- Coordinates (Mszana): 49°58′9″N 18°30′56″E
- Country: Poland
- Voivodeship: Silesian
- County: Wodzisław
- Seat: Mszana

Area
  - Total: 31 km^{2} (12 sq mi)

Population (2019-06-30)
  - Total: 7,702
  - Density: 250/km^{2} (640/sq mi)
- Website: https://www.mszana.ug.gov.pl

Gmina Mszana is a rural gmina (administrative district) in Wodzisław County, Silesian Voivodeship, in southern Poland. Its seat is the village of Mszana, which lies approximately 6 kilometres (4 mi) south-east of Wodzisław Śląski and 47 km (29 mi) south-west of the regional capital Katowice. The gmina also contains the villages of Gogołowa and Połomia.

The gmina covers an area of 31 square kilometres (12.0 sq mi), and as of 2019 its total population is 7,702.

== Neighbouring gminas ==
Gmina Mszana is bordered by the towns of Jastrzębie-Zdrój and Wodzisław Śląski, and by the gminas of Godów, Marklowice and Świerklany.

== Twin towns – sister cities ==
Gmina Mszana is twinned with:

- Budišov nad Budišovkou, Czech Republic
- Fryčovice, Czech Republic
- Griesstätt, Germany
- Houdain, France
