= Rogów, Silesian Voivodeship =

Rogów
- Village
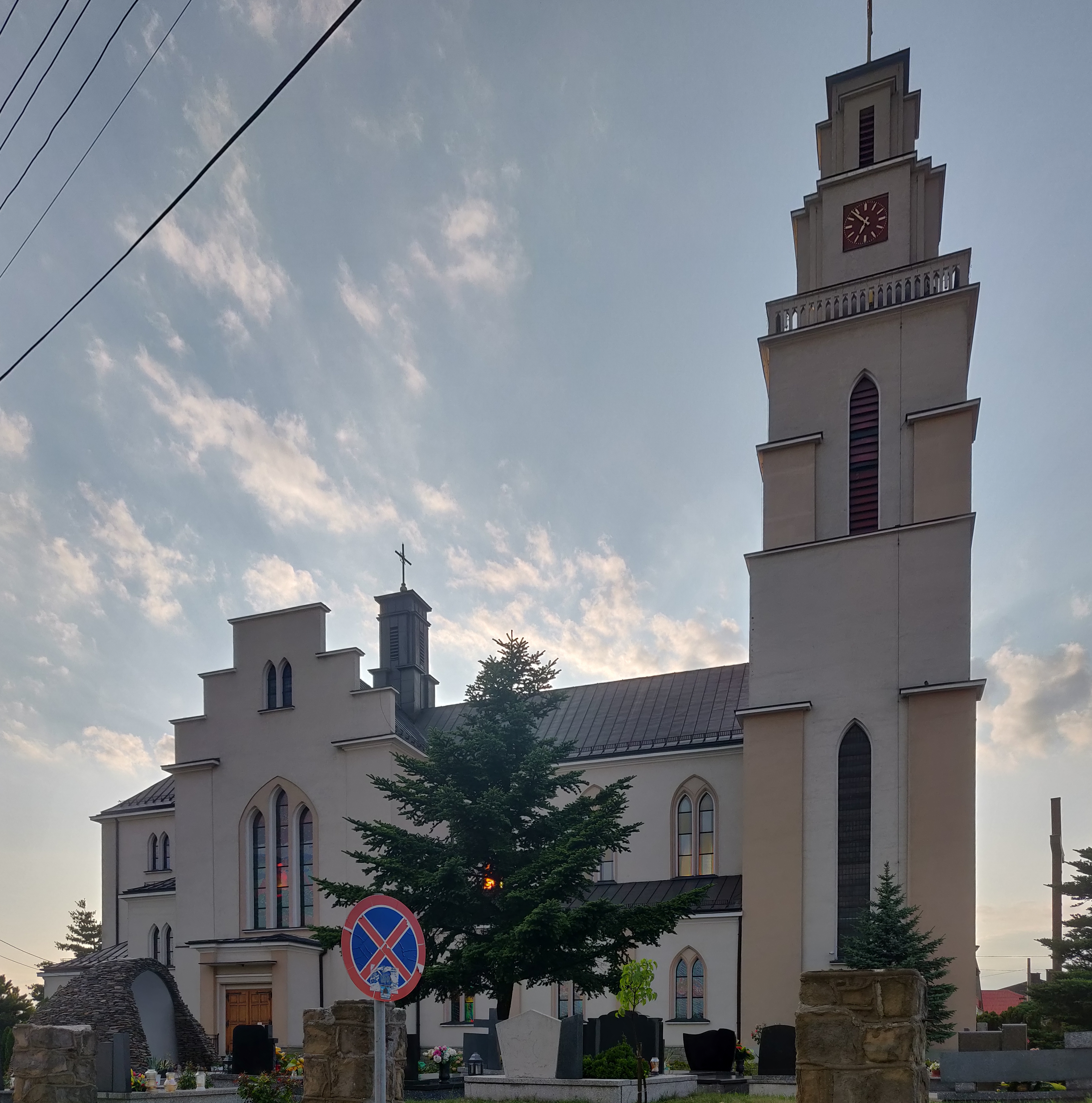
- Church of the Sacred Heart

- Coat of arms

- Location within Poland
- Coordinates: 49°59′23″N 18°21′5″E
- Country: Poland
- Voivodeship: Silesian
- County: Wodzisław
- Gmina: Gorzyce
- First mentioned: 1351

Government
  - Mayor: Halina Zbroja

Area
  - Total: 7.06 km^{2} (2.73 sq mi)

Population (2006)
  - Total: 2,905
  - Density: 411/km^{2} (1,070/sq mi)
- Time zone: UTC+1 (CET)
  - Summer (DST): UTC+2 (CEST)
- Postal code: 44-362
- Car plates: SWD
- Website: http://www.rogow.pl/

Rogów [ˈrɔɡuf] is a village in Gmina Gorzyce, Wodzisław County, Silesian Voivodeship, Poland.
