= Świerklany Dolne =

- Village
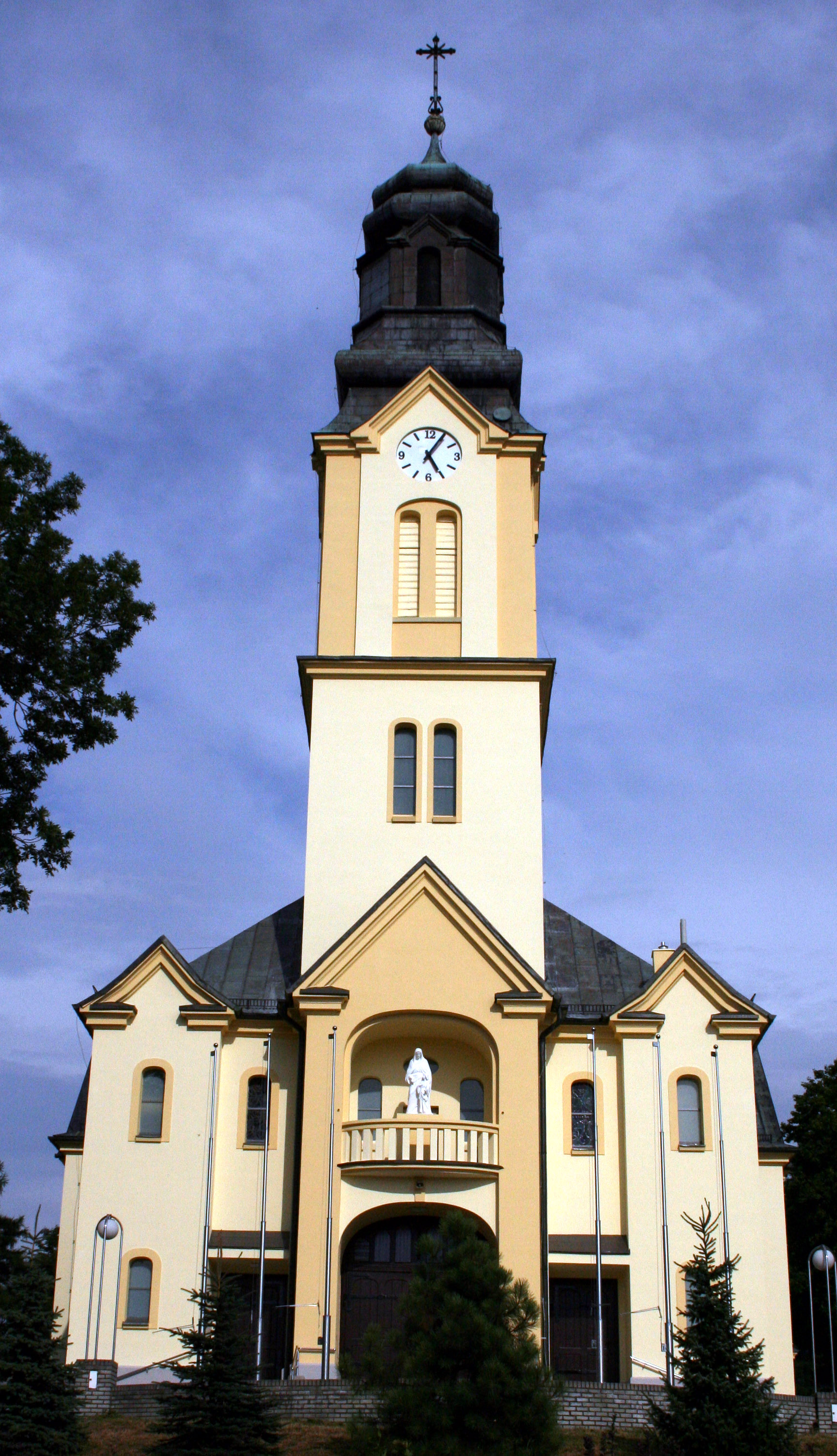
- Saint Anne Church

- Location within Poland
- Coordinates: 50°1′N 18°35′E
- Country: Poland
- Voivodeship: Silesian
- County: Rybnik
- Gmina: Świerklany
- First mentioned: 1305
- Population: 3,300
- Website: http://www.swierklany.pl/swierklany_dolne.html

Świerklany Dolne (Polish: [ɕfjɛrˈklanɨ ˈdɔlnɛ]) is a village in the administrative district of Gmina Świerklany, within Rybnik County, Silesian Voivodeship, in southern Poland.

The village was first mentioned in a Latin document of Diocese of Wrocław called Liber fundationis episcopatus Vratislaviensis from around 1305 as item in Swrklant debent esse XXIII) mansi.
