= Lubomia =

- Village
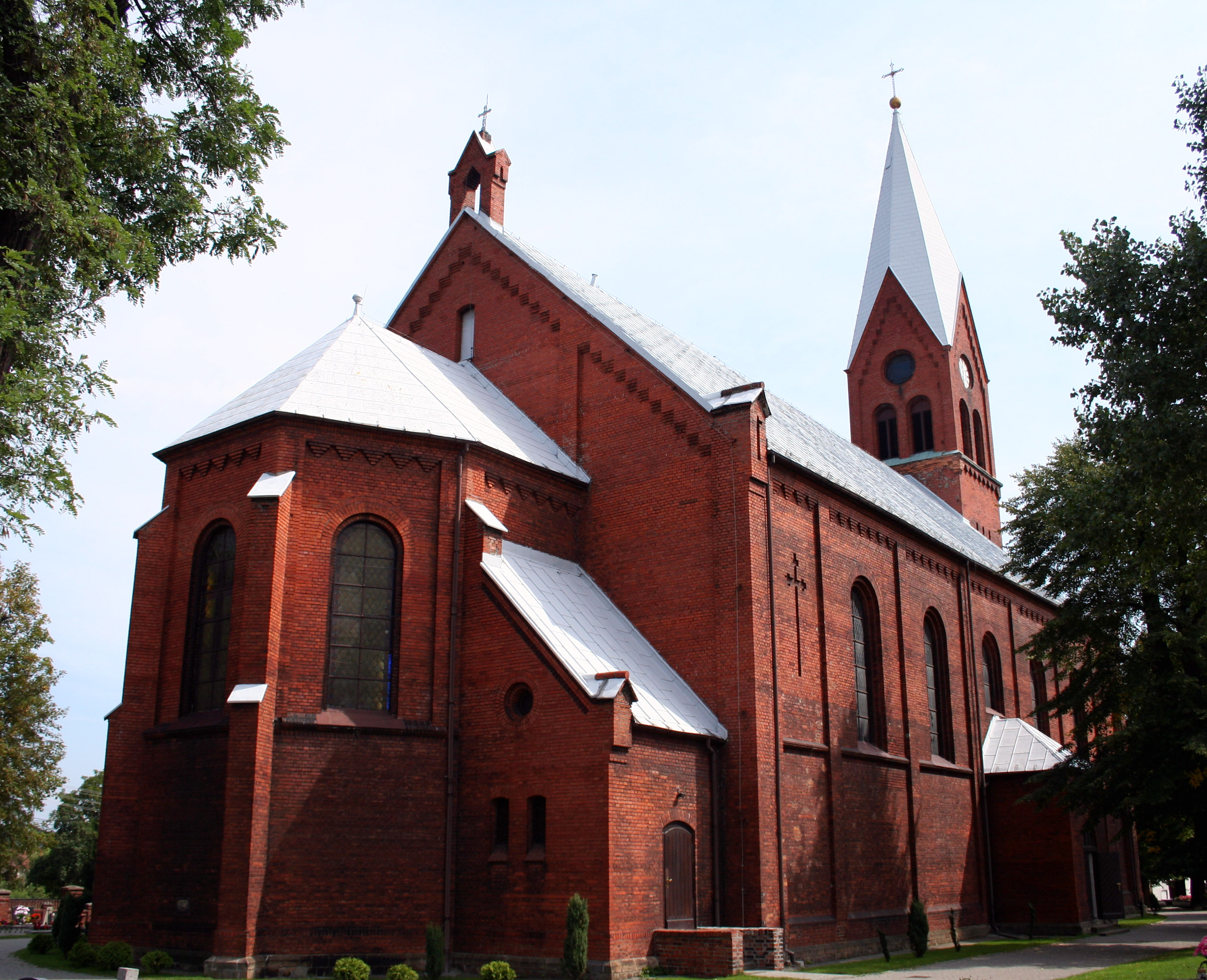
- Saint Mary Magdalene Church

- Location within Poland
- Coordinates: 50°02′N 18°18′E
- Country: Poland
- Voivodeship: Silesian
- County: Wodzisław
- Gmina: Lubomia
- First mentioned: 1303
- Population (2021): 3,701
- Time zone: UTC+1 (CET)
  - Summer (DST): UTC+2 (CEST)
- Postal code: 44-360
- Car plates: SWD
- Website: http://www.lubomia.pl/

Lubomia [luˈbɔmja] is a village and the seat of Gmina Lubomia, Wodzisław County, Silesian Voivodeship, southern Poland near the Czech border.

Within its borders, it contains the Wielikąt Nature Reserve, an Important Bird Area, as well as part of the Natura 2000 Network.

== History ==
The earliest signs of settlement in the area come from the Neolithic period. Between the 7th and 9th Centuries, there appeared to exist a village, a gord and other traces of the Golensizi tribe. The tribe abandoned the gord around 874-855.

Lubomia was first mentioned in 1303, was owned by the Reiswitz Noble Family from 1572 onwards, then got sold to Prince Karl Franz Leopold Bernhard Lichnowsky in 1730.

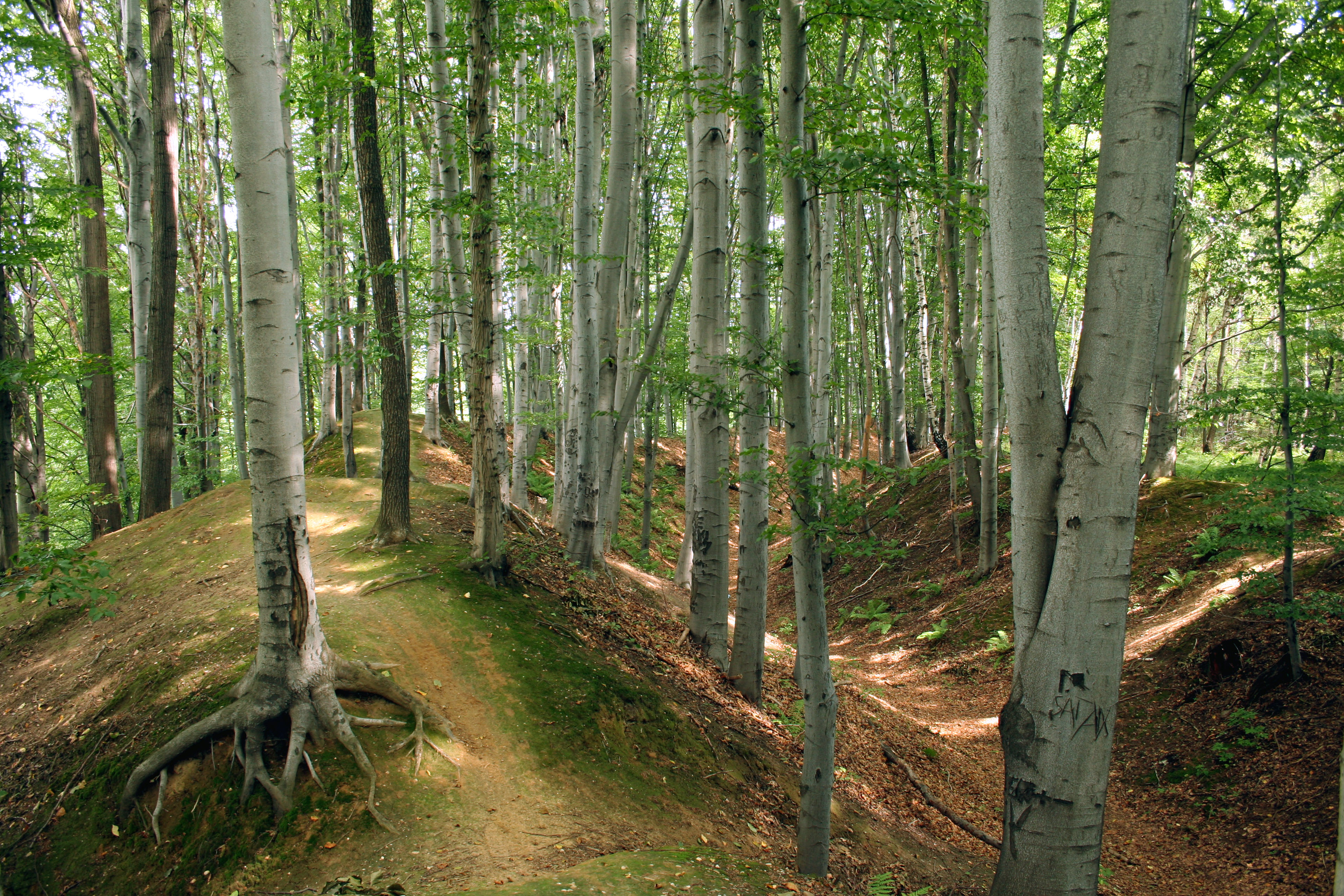
Hill fort, inhabited by Golęszycy tribe between 7th-9th centuries

== Twin towns ==
- (Czech Republic) Horní Suchá (Sucha Górna)

== People ==
- Mariusz Pawełek, Polish footballer
- Franciszek Smuda, Polish football manager
