= Rydułtowy =

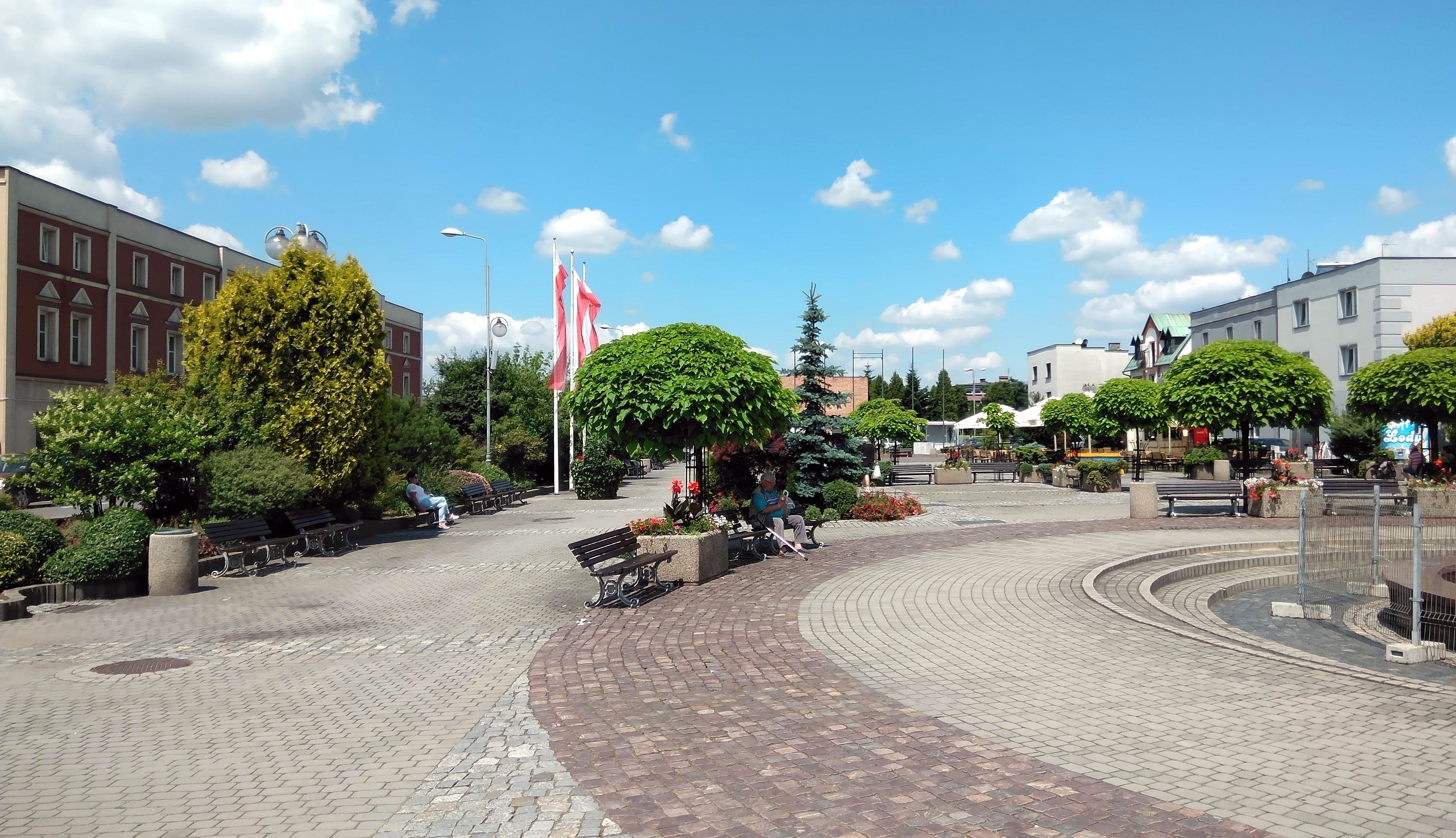
- Market Square in Rydułtowy

- Flag Coat of arms

- Location within Poland
- Coordinates: 50°3′30″N 18°25′0″E
- Country: Poland
- Voivodeship: Silesian
- County: Wodzisław
- Gmina: Rydułtowy (urban gmina)
- First mentioned: 1228

Government
  - Mayor: Marcin Połomski

Area
  - Total: 15 km^{2} (5.8 sq mi)

Population (2019-06-30)
  - Total: 21,616
  - Density: 1,400/km^{2} (3,700/sq mi)
- Time zone: UTC+1 (CET)
  - Summer (DST): UTC+2 (CEST)
- Postal code: 44-280
- Vehicle registration: SWD
- Website: http://www.rydultowy.pl

Rydułtowy [rɨduu̯ˈtɔvɨ] (German: Rydultau) is a town in southern Poland, in the Wodzisław County of the Silesian Voivodeship. Rydułtowy is in the south-western part of the Silesian Highland, on the Rybnik Plateau, in the Oświęcim-Racibórz Valley.

A mining town, Rydułtowy has been closely bound with the 200-year-old "Rydułtowy-Anna" coal mine.

== History ==
Rydułtowy was first mentioned in a document of the Diocese of Wrocław from 1228 as Rudolphi Willa, when it was part of the Duchy of Racibórz of fragmented Piast-ruled Poland.

In 1861, Rydułtowy Dolne had an entirely Polish population of 1,066, while Rydułtowy Górne had 360 inhabitants. In the late 19th century, the main occupation of the population was farming and coal mining. In 1923, the first Polish scout troop of Rydułtowy was founded. Rydułtowy Dolne and Rydułtowy Górne were merged in 1926.

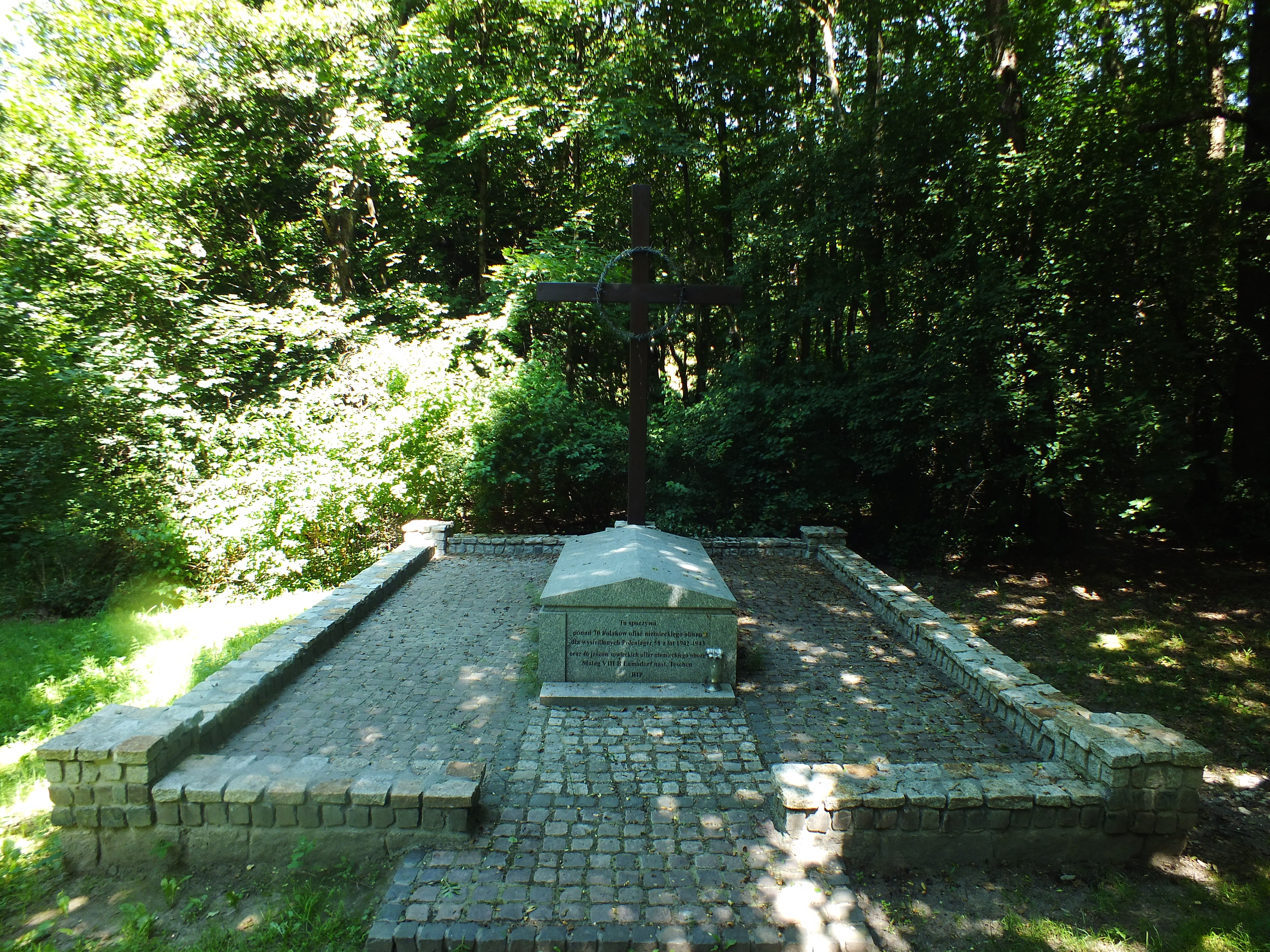
Mass grave of over 70 Poles and 46 Soviet prisoners of war, victims of German forced labor camps

Following the German-Soviet invasion of Poland, which started World War II in September 1939, Rydułtowy was occupied by Germany until 1945. Many local Polish scouts were killed during the war, and some teachers from Rydułtowy were among Polish teachers murdered by the Germans in concentration camps as part of the Intelligenzaktion (see Nazi crimes against the Polish nation), whereas two Polish policemen were murdered by the Russians in the Katyn massacre in 1940. The German Nazi administration operated five forced labour camps in Rydułtowy, including a subcamp of the Auschwitz concentration camp. The prisoners of the camps were initially Poles from nearby settlements, and then also French, English and Soviet prisoners of war. Over 1,000 mostly Jewish prisoners were held in the subcamp of Auschwitz. Prisoners unable to continue labour were sent back to Auschwitz and gassed there, while over 50 prisoners died in the subcamp itself, also by suicide. In January 1945, the Germans evacuated the prisoners on foot to Wodzisław Śląski, and then deported them to the Mauthausen concentration camp.

In 1951, Rydułtowy was granted town rights, and the neighboring settlement of Pietrzkowice was included within town limits as a new district.

== Landmarks ==
- Housing in the Charles's building settlement
- Municipal Hospital buildings "Rydułtowy" ZOZ (health care service)
- Penitential cross
- Railway station
- Rail tunnel
- Scales building KWK "Rydułtowy" (coal mine)
- St. Hyacinth's Church
- St. George's Church

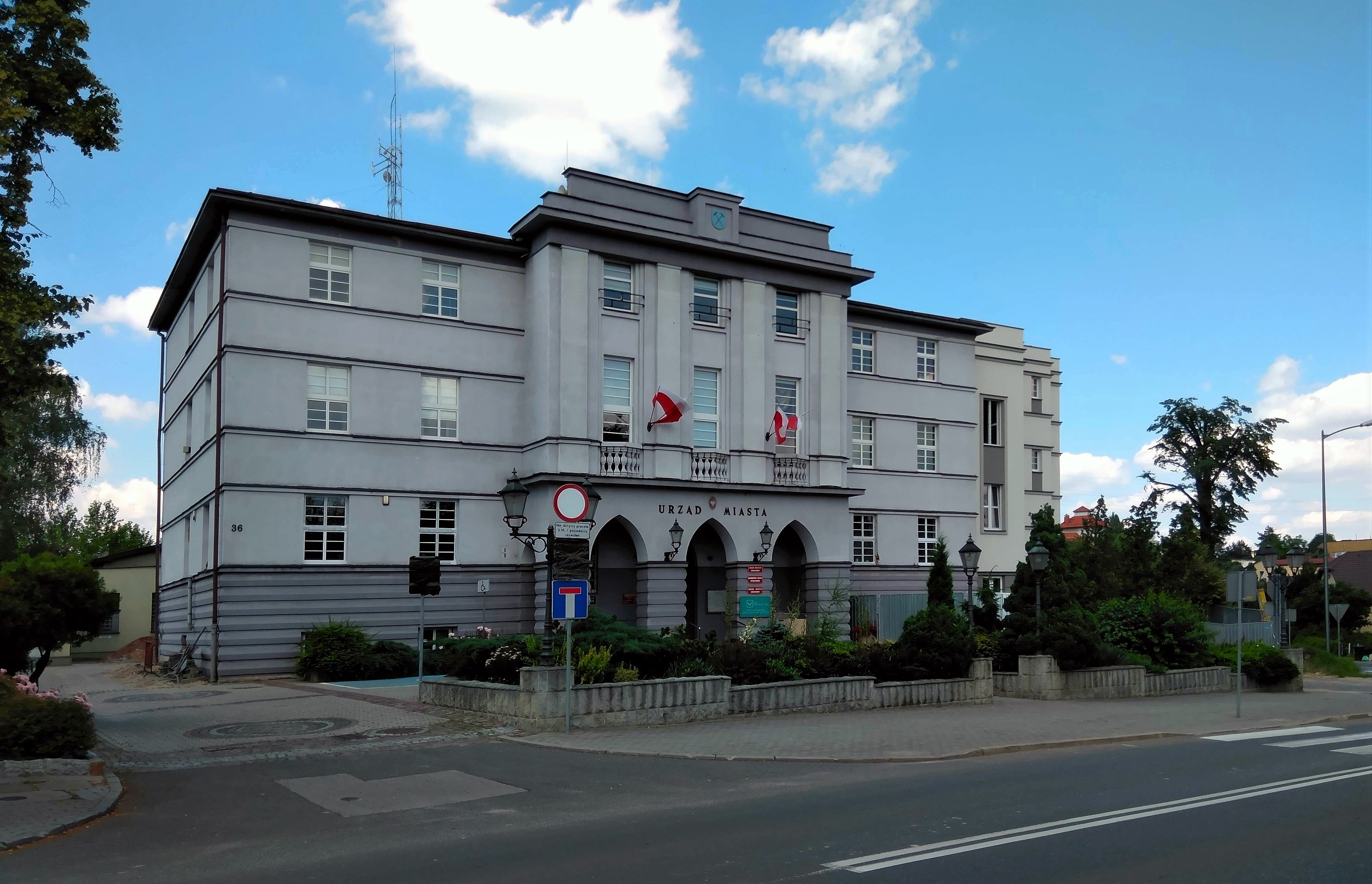
Town Hall

== Sports ==
The local football team is Naprzód Rydułtowy. It competes in the lower leagues.

== Twin towns – sister cities ==
Rydułtowy is twinned with:

- Hvidovre, Denmark
- Orlová, Czech Republic
- Reken, Germany
