= Marklowice =

- Village
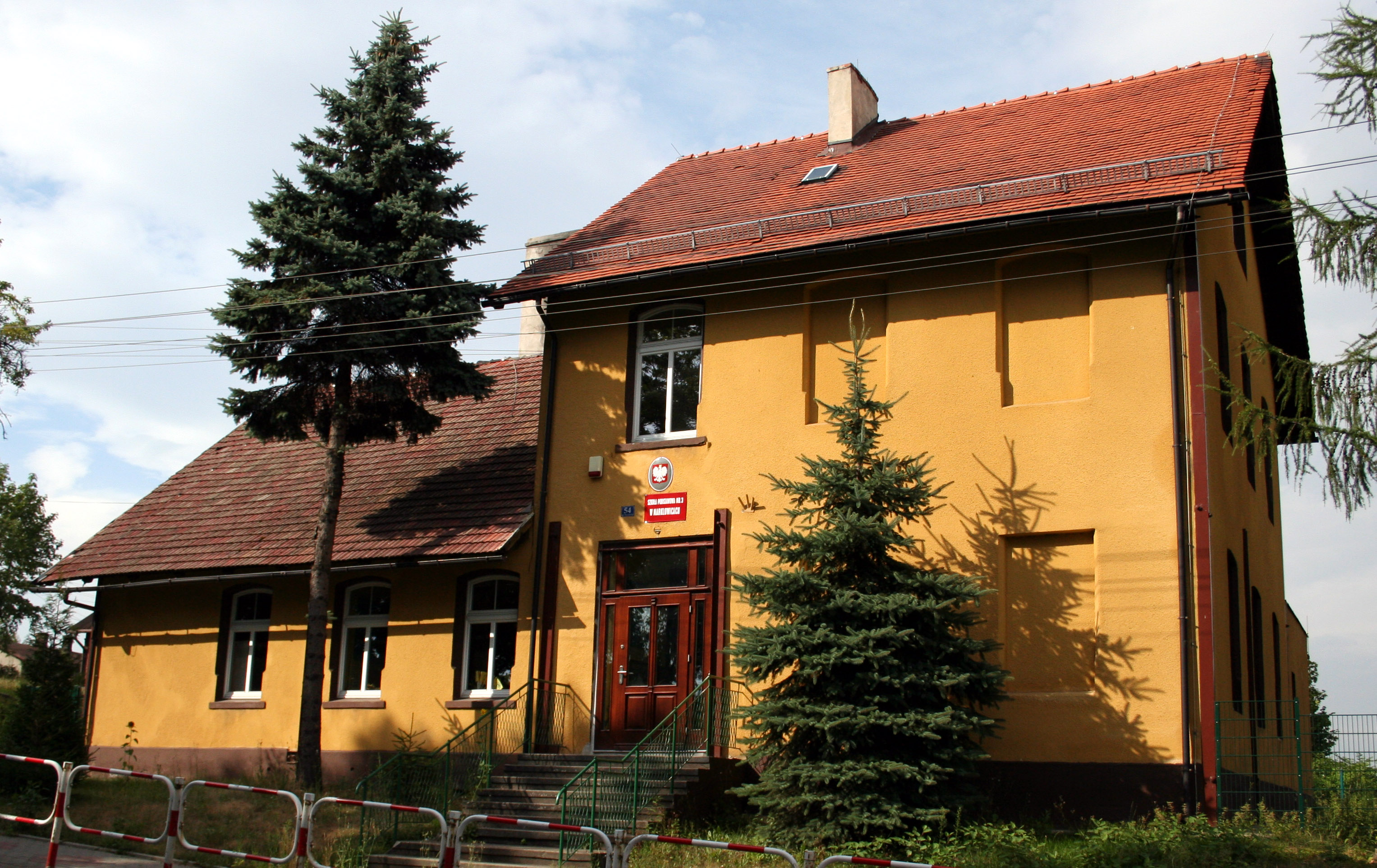
- Elementary school

- Coat of arms

- Location within Poland
- Coordinates: 50°1′6″N 18°31′29″E
- Country: Poland
- Voivodeship: Silesian
- County: Wodzisław
- Gmina: Marklowice
- First mentioned: 1305
- Population: 5,180
- Website: http://www.marklowice.pl/

Marklowice [marklɔˈvit͡sɛ] is a village in Wodzisław County, Silesian Voivodeship, in southern Poland. It is the seat of the gmina (administrative district) called Gmina Marklowice. Between 1975 and 1994 Marklowice was part of the town Wodzisław Śląski.

In 2005 the village had a population of 5,180. The football club Polonia Marklowice, founded in 1922, plays in the village.

The village was first mentioned in a Latin document of Diocese of Wrocław called Liber fundationis episcopatus Vratislaviensis from around 1305 as item in Merclini villa debent esse XXXIII) mansi.
