= Jankowice Rybnickie =

- Village
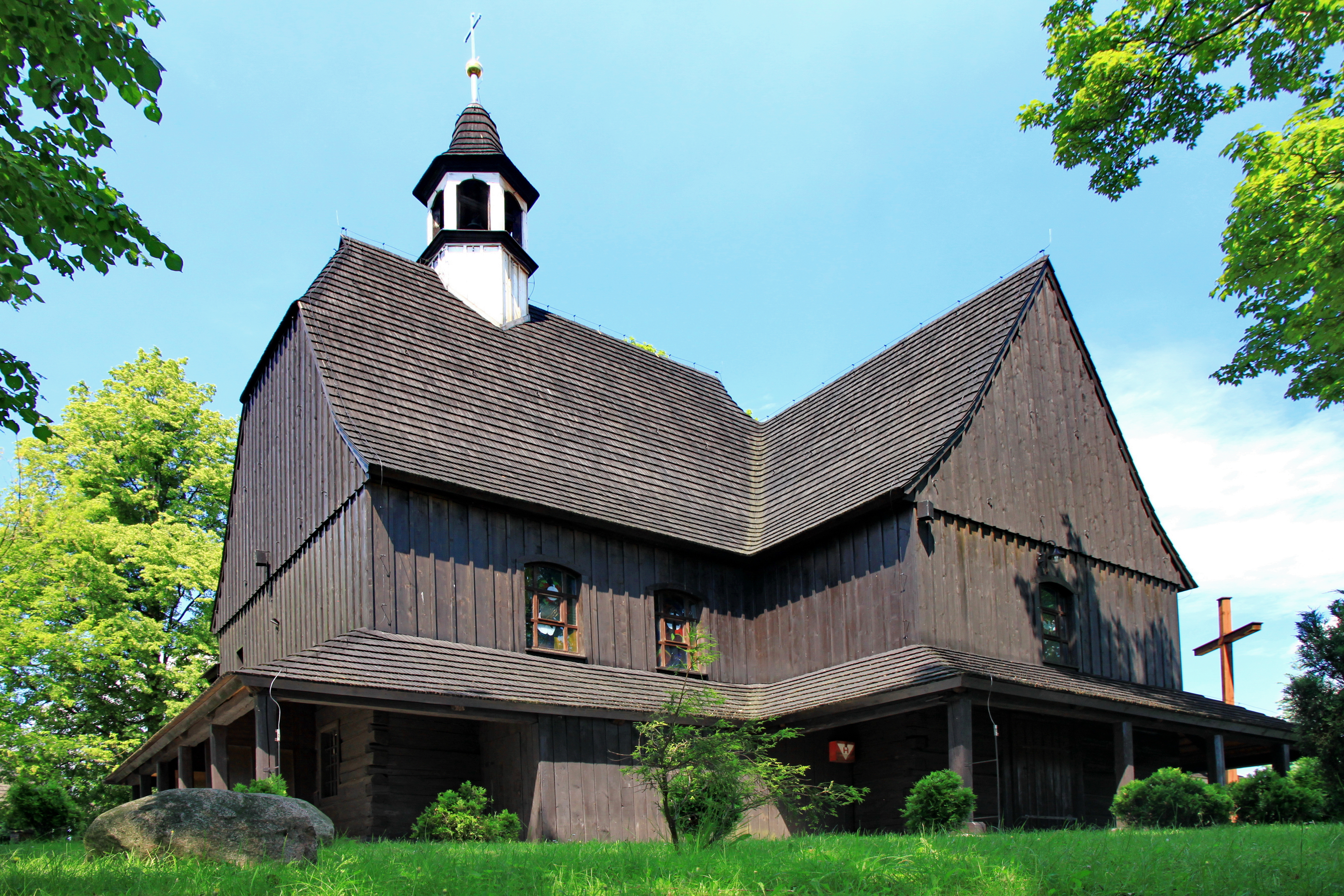
- Corpus Christi Church

- Location within Poland
- Coordinates: 50°2′N 18°33′E
- Country: Poland
- Voivodeship: Silesian
- County: Rybnik
- Gmina: Świerklany
- Population: 3,900
- Website: http://www.swierklany.pl/jankowice.html

Jankowice Rybnickie [jankɔˈvit͡sɛ rɨbˈnit͡skʲɛ] is a village in Rybnik County, Silesian Voivodeship, in southern Poland. It is the seat of the gmina (administrative district) called Gmina Świerklany.
