= Radlin, Silesian Voivodeship =

Radlin
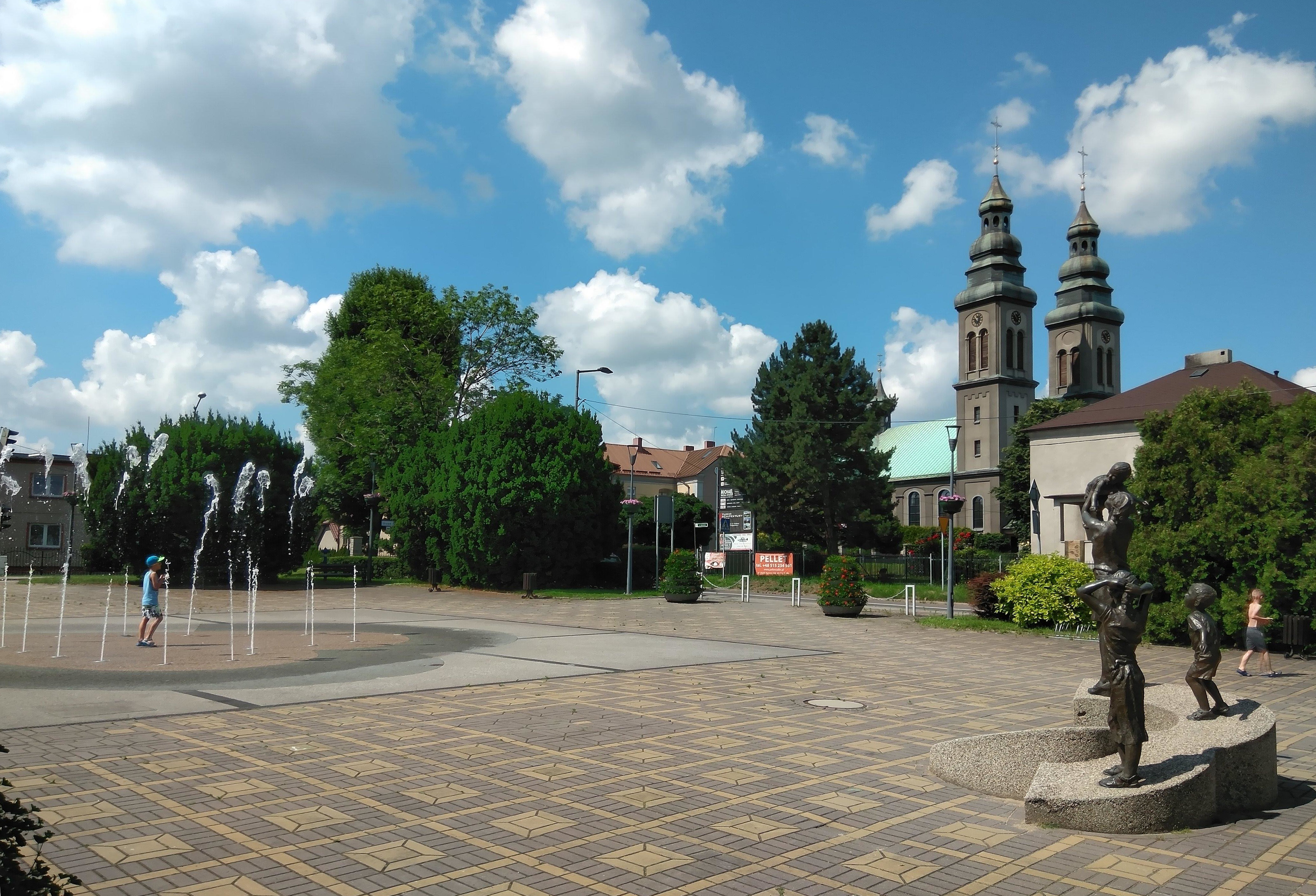
- Central square in Radlin

- Coat of arms
- Interactive map of Radlin
- Location within Poland
- Coordinates: 50°1′0″N 18°29′0″E
- Country: Poland
- Voivodeship: Silesian
- County: Wodzisław
- Gmina: Radlin (urban gmina)
- First mentioned: 1365

Government
  - Mayor: Barbara Magiera

Area
  - Total: 12.53 km^{2} (4.84 sq mi)
- Highest elevation: 298 m (978 ft)
- Lowest elevation: 245 m (804 ft)

Population (2023)
  - Total: 16,829
  - Density: 1,343/km^{2} (3,479/sq mi)
- Time zone: UTC+1 (CET)
  - Summer (DST): UTC+2 (CEST)
- Postal code: 44-310
- Car plates: SWD
- Website: www.radlin.pl

Radlin [ˈradlʲin] is a town in Wodzisław County, Silesian Voivodeship, in southern Poland, with 16,829 inhabitants (2023). It is located in southern part of the Voivodeship, close to the Czech border.

== History ==
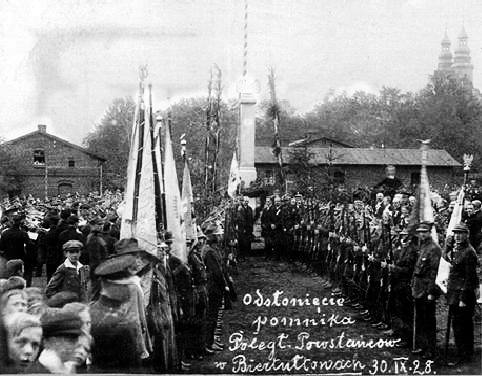
Unveiling of a monument to the fallen Polish insurgents in 1928

First mention of the settlement of Biertułtowy (which now is the center of Radlin) comes from 1305, as Bertholdi villa, when it was part of Piast-ruled Poland. The very name Radlin probably comes from the Polish word radło, which means ard.

In the 18th century, it was annexed by the Kingdom of Prussia. In the 19th century, Radlin was one of the biggest villages of the Rybnik County. Like other locations of Upper Silesia, it grew in the 19th century, when several enterprises were opened there – Coal Mine Marcel, Coke Plant Radlin. In 1922, after Silesian Uprisings, it became again part of Poland.

Following the German-Soviet invasion of Poland, which started World War II in September 1939, Radlin was occupied by Germany until 1945. Two mine workers from Radlin were murdered by the Russians in the Katyn massacre in 1940.

Between 1975 and 1997 Radlin was a district of the city of Wodzisław Śląski.

== Sport ==
- Górnik Radlin – men's volleyball team playing in Polish Volleyball League
- KS Górnik Radlin – men's football team, formerly playing in the top division
- KG Radlin – gymnastic club, founded in 1920, where 20 Polish Olympic athletes trained

== Sights ==
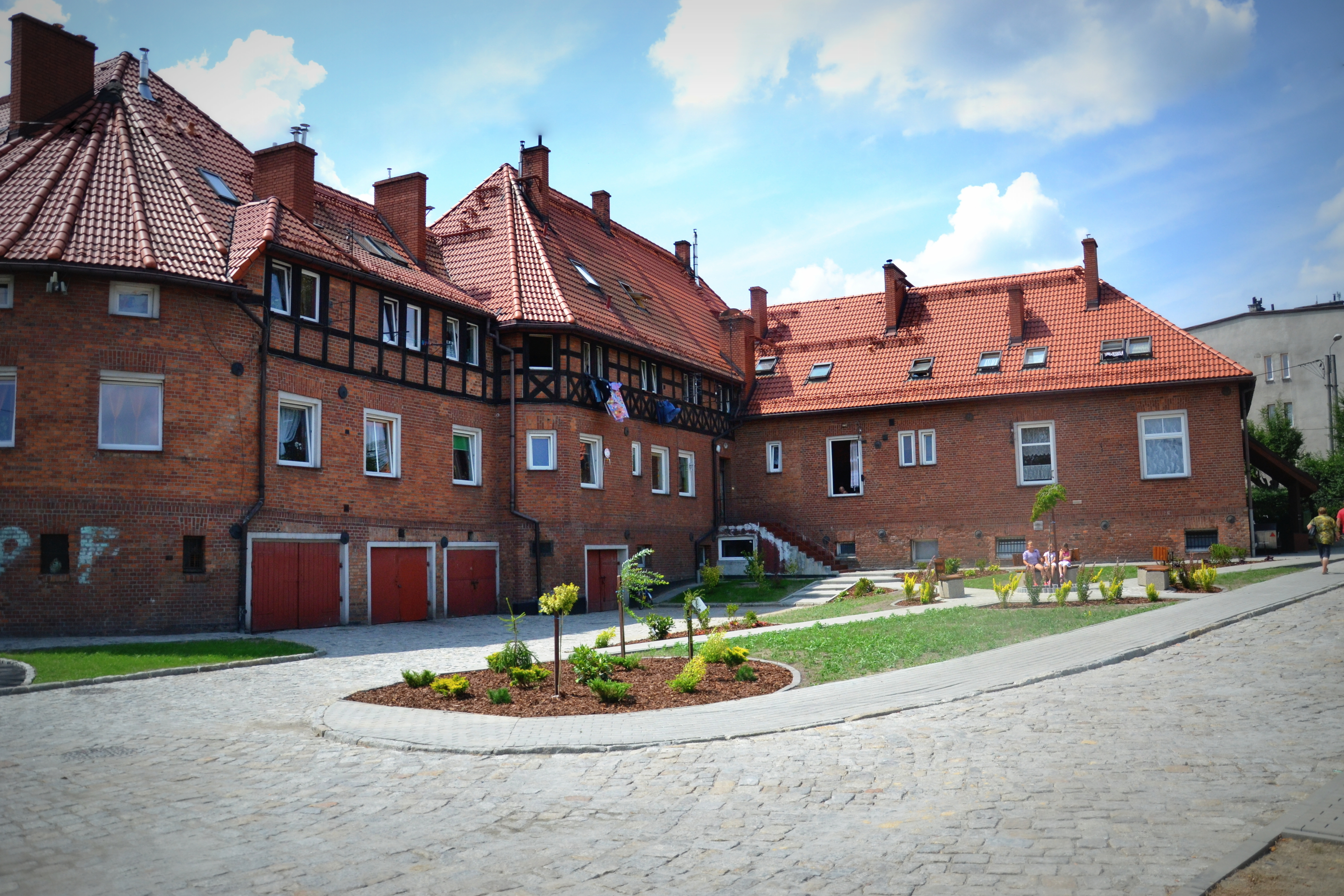
Emma workers' estate

- Graduation Tower – first graduation tower on an industrial side of Upper Silesia in Poland
- Kolonia Emma – modernist estate of the nineteenth century designed as a "garden city"

== Notable people ==
- Bolesław Kominek (1903–1974), Cardinal of the Roman Catholic Church
- Leszek Blanik (born 1977), gymnast, World and Olympic champion

== Twin towns – sister cities ==
Radlin is twinned with:

- Genthin, Germany
- Mohelnice, Czech Republic
- Rohatyn, Ukraine
