= Wodzisław County =

Wodzisław County Powiat wodzisławski
- County
- Flag Coat of arms

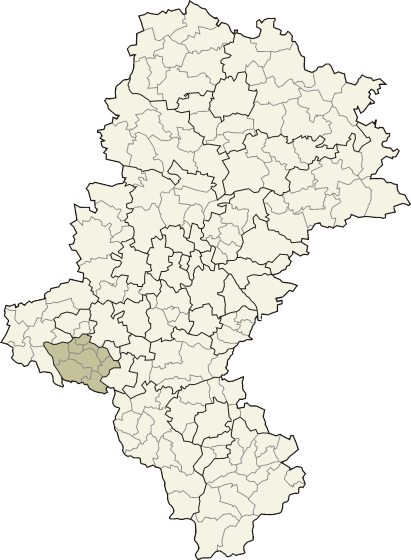
- Location within Silesian Voivodeship
- Coordinates (Wodzisław Śląski): 50°0′N 18°27′E
- Country: Poland
- Voivodeship: Silesian
- Seat: Wodzisław Śląski
- Gminas: Total 9 (incl. 4 urban): Pszów; Radlin; Rydułtowy; Wodzisław Śląski; Gmina Godów; Gmina Gorzyce; Gmina Lubomia; Gmina Marklowice; Gmina Mszana

Government
  - Starosta: Tadeusz Skatuła

Area
  - Total: 286.92 km^{2} (110.78 sq mi)

Population (2019-06-30)
  - Total: 157,346
  - Density: 548.40/km^{2} (1,420.3/sq mi)
  - Urban: 101,280
  - Rural: 56,066
- Car plates: SWD
- Website: www.powiatwodzislawski.pl

Wodzisław County (Polish: powiat wodzisławski) is a unit of territorial administration and local government (powiat) in Silesian Voivodeship, southern Poland, on the Czech border. It came into being on 1 January 1999 as a result of the Polish local government reforms passed in 1998. Its administrative seat and largest town is Wodzisław Śląski, which lies 49 kilometres (30 mi) south-west of the regional capital Katowice. The county contains three other towns: Rydułtowy, 7 km (4 mi) north of Wodzisław Śląski, Radlin, 4 km (2 mi) north-east of Wodzisław Śląski, and Pszów, 7 km (4 mi) north-west of Wodzisław Śląski.

The county covers an area of 286.92 square kilometres (110.8 sq mi). As of 2019 its total population is 157,346, out of which the population of Wodzisław Śląski is 47,992, that of Rydułtowy is 21,616, that of Radlin is 17,776, that of Pszów is 13,896, and the rural population is 56,066.

== History ==
Wodzisław area was heavily influenced by the Duchy of Racibórz, Duchy of Wodzisław and Wodzisław State country in the Middle Ages and later. First Wodzisław county was created in 1954. It covered vast area, including current Wodzisław County and Jastrzębie-Zdrój. In 1975 administrative reforms repealed counties (powiaty) in Poland. In 1999 Jerzy Buzek government restored Wodzisław county (without Jastrzębie) along with other counties.

== Neighbouring counties ==
Wodzisław County is bordered by Racibórz County to the west, the city of Rybnik and Rybnik County to the north-east, and the city of Jastrzębie-Zdrój to the east. It also borders the Czech Republic to the south.

== Administrative divisions ==
The county is subdivided into nine gminas (four urban and five rural). These are listed in the following table, in descending order of population.

Gmina	Type	Area (km^{2})	Population (2019)	Seat
Wodzisław Śląski	urban	49.6	47,992	
Rydułtowy	urban	15.0	21,616	
Gmina Gorzyce	rural	64.5	21,285	Gorzyce
Radlin	urban	12.5	17,776	
Pszów	urban	20.4	13,896	
Gmina Godów	rural	38.0	13,758	Godów
Gmina Lubomia	rural	41.8	7,925	Lubomia
Gmina Mszana	rural	31.0	7,702	Mszana
Gmina Marklowice	rural	13.8	5,396	Marklowice

== Sights ==
Wodzisław Śląski

- the gothic church of "Sante Trinity" from 15th century (Kościół św. Trójcy), erected in 1257 year
- the Monastery from 17th century ( "Klasztor franciszkański" ), erected in 1257 year
- the neo-Gothic church of "Assumption of St. Mary" (Kościół WNMP)
- the building of the former district authority (19th century)
- the neo-classical Wall tower (Baszta rycerska)
- the Classicism Palace oldest in Poland from 1745 year. (Today Museum)
- the old town square (Rynek),
- the Palace in Kokoszyce (Pałac w Kokoszycach) 1823 year

Rydułtowy

- Scales building KWK "Rydułtowy" (coal mine)
- Rail Tunnel
- St. George's Church

Radlin

- Assumption of St. Mary's church

== Twin regions ==
Wodzisław County is twinned with:

- Recklinghausen (district), Germany

== See also ==
- Silesia Euroregion
