= Battle of Olza =

- Part of Silesian Uprisings
Date	May 23, 1921
Location	Olza, near Loslau, Upper Silesia, Germany
Result	Polish Pyrrhic victory

Belligerents
Polish insurgents	(Weimar Republic) Selbstschutz Oberschlesiens and Freikorps

Commanders and leaders
Bronisław Sikorski, Alojzy Pawelec, Ludwik Piechoczek	Georg von Werner-Ehrenfeucht, Walter Kosch

Strength
14th Wodzisław Infantry Regiment as part of “Group South”	Freikorps & Selbstschutz units

Casualties and losses
51	35

The Battle of Olza (Polish: Bitwa pod Olzą) was a battle during the Third Silesian Uprising that occurred on 23 May 1921 in the village of Olza, and concluded in Polish victory.

== Background ==
Succeeding the initiation of the Third Silesian Uprising, insurgent forces hastily occupied territory of the Wodzisław land region. The front in this southern sector stabilized along the Oder river from the Czechoslovak–Polish border to Brzezie. Within the Olza territory, positions were established and held by the 14th Wodzisław Infantry Regiment, an entity of “Group South” under Col. Bronisław Sikorski, whose headquarters were in Wodzisław Śląski.

On 21 May, the unit was partially redeployed toward the Góra Świętej Anny area, hence weakening the front along the Oder river. This presented an opportunity for German forces to mount a surprise attack at Olza.

== The Battle ==
On the morning of 23 May 1921, German forces initiated a surprise attack upon the railway bridge at Olza on the Wodzisław–Chałupki line. Utilizing an armored locomotive, they captured Olza and neighbouring localities including Odra, Bełsznica, Kamień nad Odrą and Buków. The Germans briefly succeeded in breaking the front in the Olza–Odra sector, hence threatening the rear of the insurgent forces and the uprising front as a whole in that territory. The Silesian insurgents defending the river crossings during the first phase of the battle suffered heavy losses.

Succeeding the setback, the Silesian insurgents, originating from the Wodzisław Śląski region, would initiate a counteroffensive. The counteroffensive of the Silesian insurgents concluded in success — they recuperated the localities annexed by the Germans and re-established authority over the Oder River line.

The battle was, in terms of scale, the second-largest Polish–German engagement during the uprising.

Although the insurgents managed to hold the general front, the German offensive at Olza highlighted the precariousness of the insurgent position in the southern sector and the importance of the Olza/Odra line for the overall success of the uprising.
