= Czech Republic–Poland border =

International border

Czech–Polish border
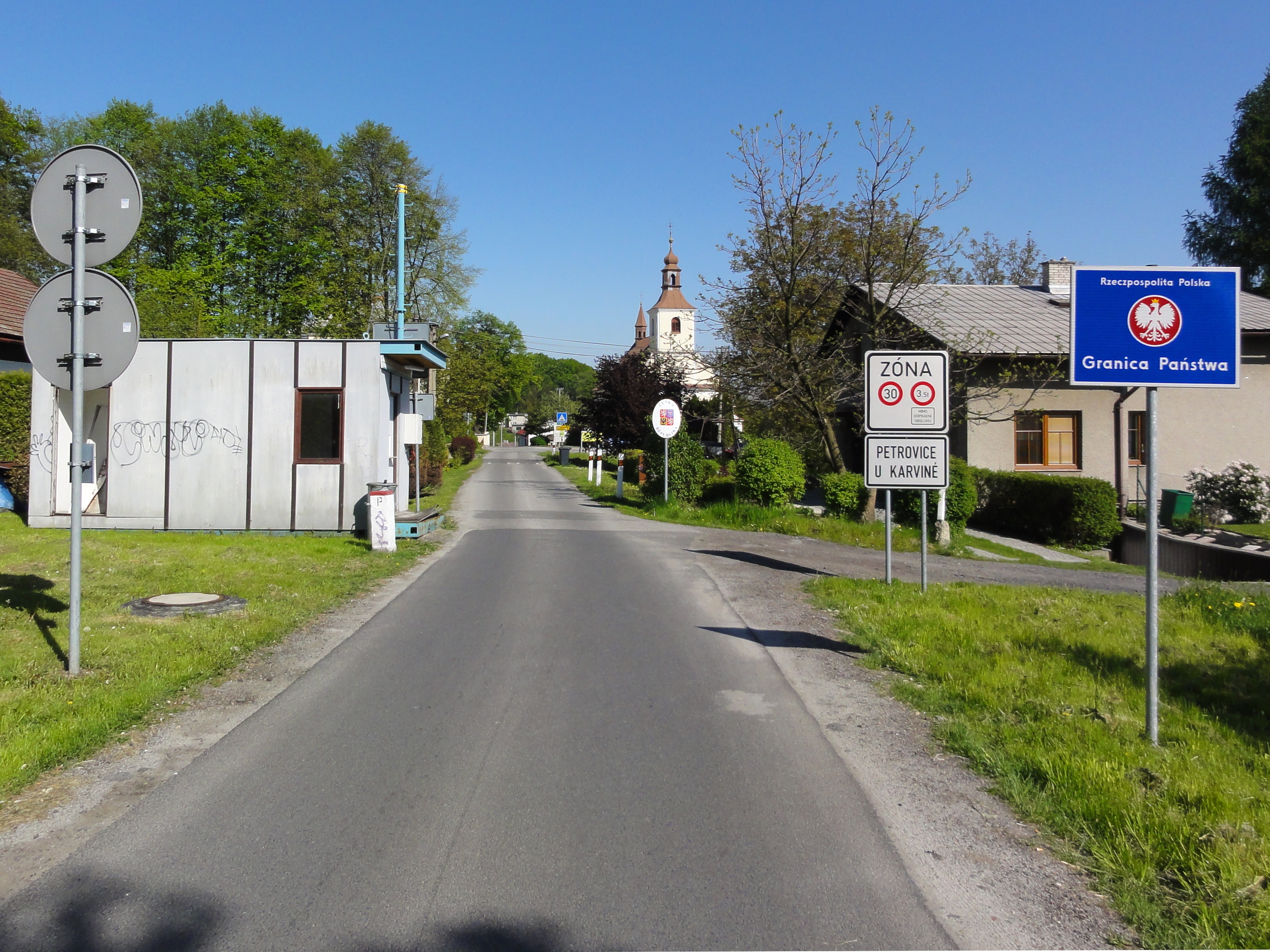
- Petrovice u Karviné / Skrbeńsko border crossing

Characteristics
- Entities: Czech Republic Poland
- Length: 796 km (495 mi)

History
- Established: 1 February 1993
- Current shape: 8 April 2011; Treaty

The Czech Republic-Poland border (Czech: Česko-polská státní hranice) is the international border between the Czech Republic (Czechia) and the Republic of Poland. The present-day Czech Republic-Poland border was technically established in 1993 following the peaceful dissolution of Czechoslovakia, though the location of the border has been largely unchanged since 1918. It is approximately 796 km (495 mi) in length and runs southeast through the Central Sudetes mountains from the tripoint with Germany to the tripoint with Slovakia.

== History ==
Excepting the six-year period from 1939 to 1945, the northern boundary of present-day Czechia has remained largely unchanged since the formation of Czechoslovakia following the First World War. The Treaty of Versailles, and later, the Treaty of St. Germain, recognized the independence of Czechoslovakia (from the former Austro-Hungarian Empire), and Poland (from Germany and the former Russian Empire), and defined their borders. In accordance with plebiscites in the years following the First World War, the Hlučín Region joined Czechoslovakia, and Cieszyn Silesia was divided between Poland and Czechoslovakia in 1920.

From 1939–1945, the Czechoslovakia-Poland border was significantly changed by the events of the Second World War. Nazi Germany annexed and occupied the Czech regions of Bohemia and Moravia; making them protectorates. The invasion and subsequent occupation of Poland divided Polish territory between Germany, the Soviet Union, Slovakia and Lithuania. At the conclusion of the war, prewar German territories east of the Oder-Neisse Line were ceded to Poland and the Soviet Union under the Potsdam Agreement. When the Oder-Neisse line became the western border of the Polish People's Republic by referendum in 1947, Lower Silesia and Upper Silesia became part of Poland, and the corresponding section of the Czechoslovakia-German border became the Czechoslovakia-Poland border.

In 1958, in an effort to straighten the border, Poland transferred 1,205.9 hectares (4.656 sq mi) of land to Czechoslovakia, and Czechoslovakia transferred 837.46 hectares (3.23 sq mi) to Poland. The discrepancy in the size of the mutual transfers, in favor of Czechoslovakia, created a so-called "border debt" (Polish: długu granicznego) of 368.44 hectares (1.42 sq mi). In 1994, Poland and the Czech Republic established a joint commission, The Polish-Czech Inter-governmental Committee for Cross-Border Cooperation, to promote cross-border cooperation and handle border related disputes. In 2015, the Czech government identified several tracts of state-owned land along the border for transfer to Poland, but ultimately withdrew from the planned transfer. As of October 2025, the 368 hectares (1.42 sq mi) "border debt" remains outstanding.

Both Poland and the Czech Republic are members of the European Union and the Schengen Area; border controls between the two countries were abolished in 2007.

== Overview ==
From the tripoint border with Germany, the Czechia-Poland border runs briefly northeast from the Zittau Basin to Zawidów, Poland, then south southeast through the Jizera Mountains and along the Jizera river to the Szklarska Pass (Polish: Przełęcz Szklarska). It then runs east southeast along the Giant Mountains to Lubawska Pass (Polish: Przełęcz Lubawska), the Stołowe Mountains, crosses Kudowa-Zdrój, passes between the Bystrzyckie Mountains and the Orlické Mountains along the Orlice valley, the Międzyleska Pass (Polish: Przełęcz Międzyleska), the Králický Sněžník Mountains, the Golden Mountains, near Złoty Stok, through Głuchołazy south to Prudnik, the Opawica and Opava valleys, crosses the Odra valley, runs along the Olza valley, through Cieszyn, along the ridge of the Czantoria and Stożek massif in the Silesian Beskids the Olza valley and further to the meeting point of the borders of Poland, the Czech Republic and Slovakia in Jaworzynka.

== Border cities and towns ==
From west to east:

- Hrádek nad Nisou
- Chrastava
- Bogatynia
- Zawidów
- Nové Město pod Smrkem and Świeradów-Zdrój
- Harrachov
- Szklarska Poręba
- Rokytnice nad Jizerou
- Piechowice
- Špindlerův Mlýn
- Karpacz
- Pec pod Sněžkou
- Kowary
- Žacléř
- Lubawka
- Trutnov
- Teplice nad Metují
- Mieroszów
- Meziměstí
- Broumov
- Radków
- Machov
- Kudowa-Zdrój
- Náchod
- Nový Hrádek
- Duszniki-Zdrój
- Międzylesie
- Králíky
- Staré Město
- Lądek-Zdrój
- Javorník
- Złoty Stok
- Vidnava
- Głuchołazy
- Zlaté Hory
- Prudnik
- Město Albrechtice
- Krnov
- Opava
- Kietrz
- Bohumín
- Jastrzębie-Zdrój
- Karviná
- Cieszyn and Český Těšín
- Třinec
- Ustroń
- Wisła

== See also ==
- Territorial changes of Poland
- Border Guard (Poland)
- Extreme points of Poland
- Geography of Poland
- Polish rail border crossings
