= Zbigniew Wodecki =

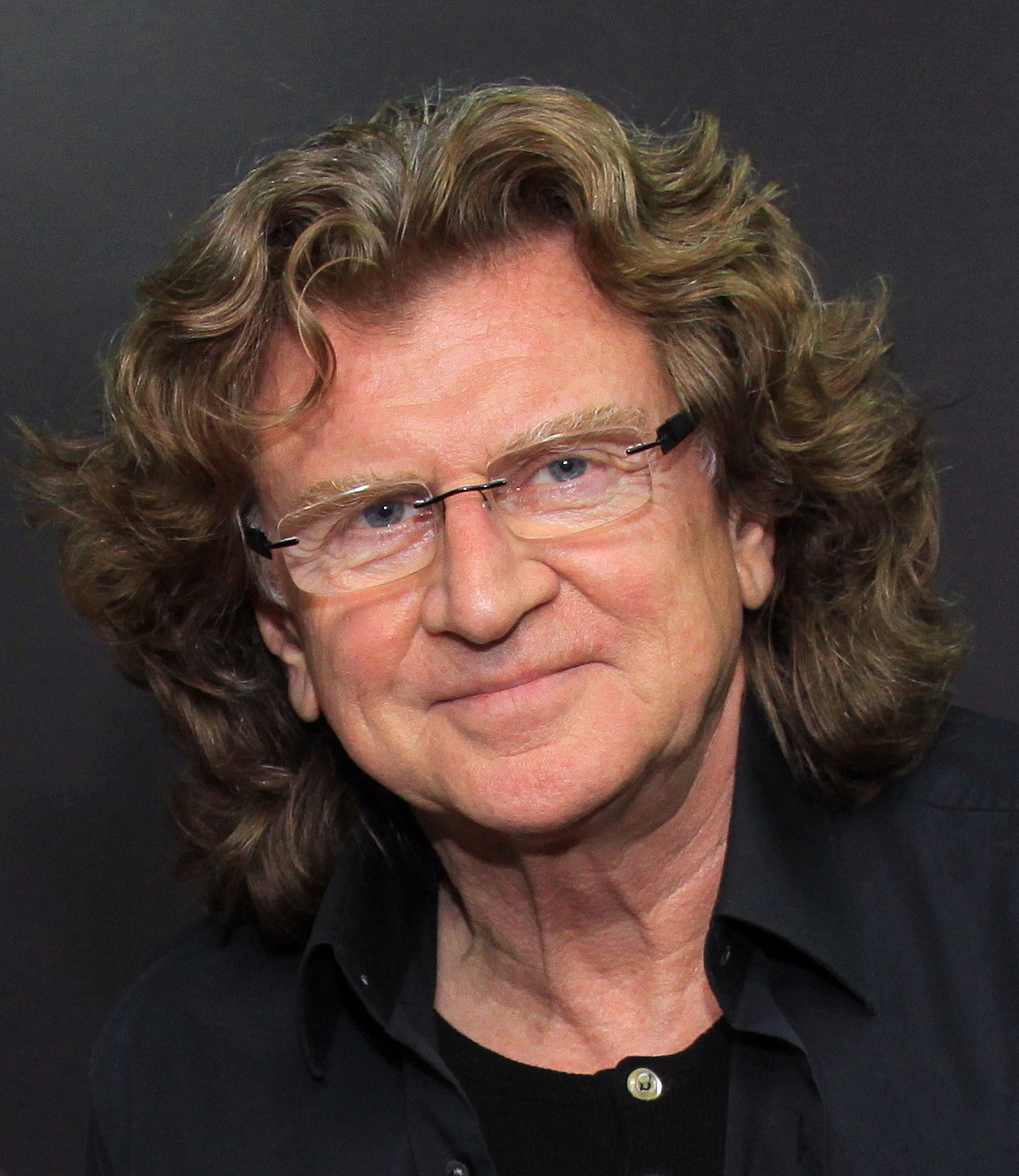

Background information
- Born: 6 May 1950; Kraków, Poland
- Died: 22 May 2017 (aged 67) Warsaw, Poland
- Genres: Pop
- Occupations: Singer; musician; composer; actor; television presenter
- Instruments: Violin; trumpet; piano
- Years active: 1968–2017
- Website: www.wodecki.pl

Zbigniew Stanisław Wodecki (Polish pronunciation: [ˈzbiɡɲɛv vɔˈdɛt͡skʲi]; 6 May 1950 – 22 May 2017) was a Polish singer, musician, composer, actor and TV presenter.

== Early life and career ==
He was born on 6 May 1950 in Kraków, Poland. He started to play the violin at the age of five. He started collaborating with the Piwnica pod Baranami literary cabaret and singer Ewa Demarczyk in the late 1960s. As a singer, he debuted in 1972 at the National Festival of Polish Song in Opole. He is mostly known for the songs Chałupy Welcome To, Lubię wracać tam, gdzie byłem, Z Tobą chcę oglądać świat (a duet with Zdzisława Sośnicka) and Zacznij od Bacha, as well as the Polish versions of several soundtracks – Maya the Honey Bee and Rudolph the Red-Nosed Reindeer: The Movie. In the 1980s he performed in a cabaret with Zenon Laskowik. He appeared as one of the judges on the Polish version of Dancing with the Stars, Taniec z gwiazdami, during its first twelve seasons.

Considered one of the most popular singers of the 1970s and 1980s in Poland, he was awarded numerous awards for his artistic achievements including Best Debut Award at the Opole Music Festival in 1972, Journalists' Award at the Opole Music Festival in 1978, Special Award at the Opole Music Festival in 1991, 2 Fryderyk Awards in 2016 and a Golden Fryderyk Award in 2018, Silver Medal for Merit to Culture – Gloria Artis in 2011 and posthumously the Commander's Cross of the Order of Polonia Restituta (2017).

== Health problems and death ==
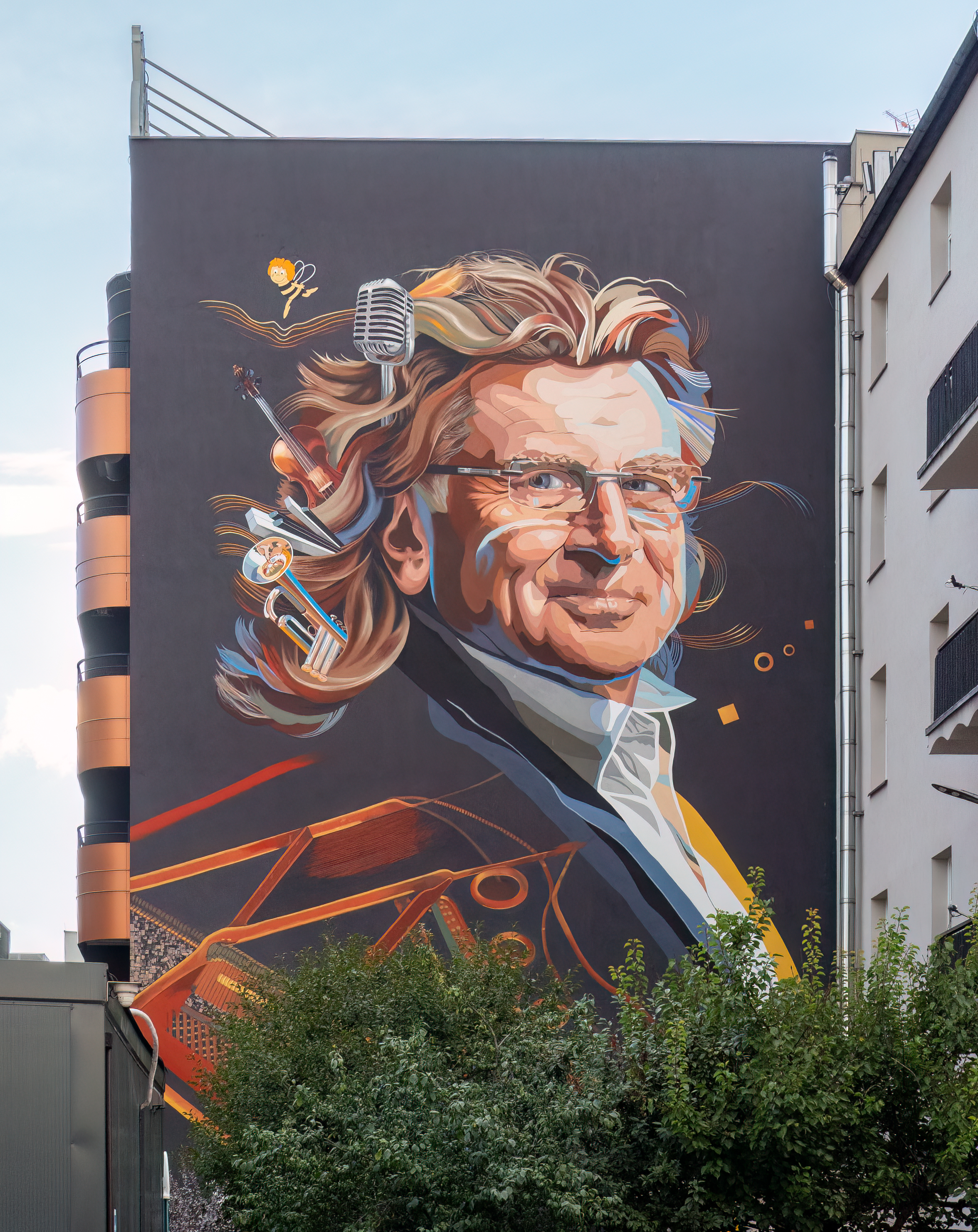
Mural of Wodecki in Katowice

In 2014, Wodecki revealed that he had atrial fibrillation and chronic obstructive pulmonary disease. On 8 May 2017, the artist suffered a massive stroke, a complication from bypass surgery he had at a private clinic, on 5 May 2017, and was taken to intensive care at Central Clinical Hospital of the Ministry of Interior and Administration in Warsaw, where he died 13 days later of complications from the stroke.

== Personal life ==
Wodecki and his wife, Krystyna, had three children. His family originated from Łaziska, Wodzisław County. He was an honorary citizen of Gmina Godów (Wodzisław County). He was known as an ally of the LGBT community.
