= Uchylsko =

- Village
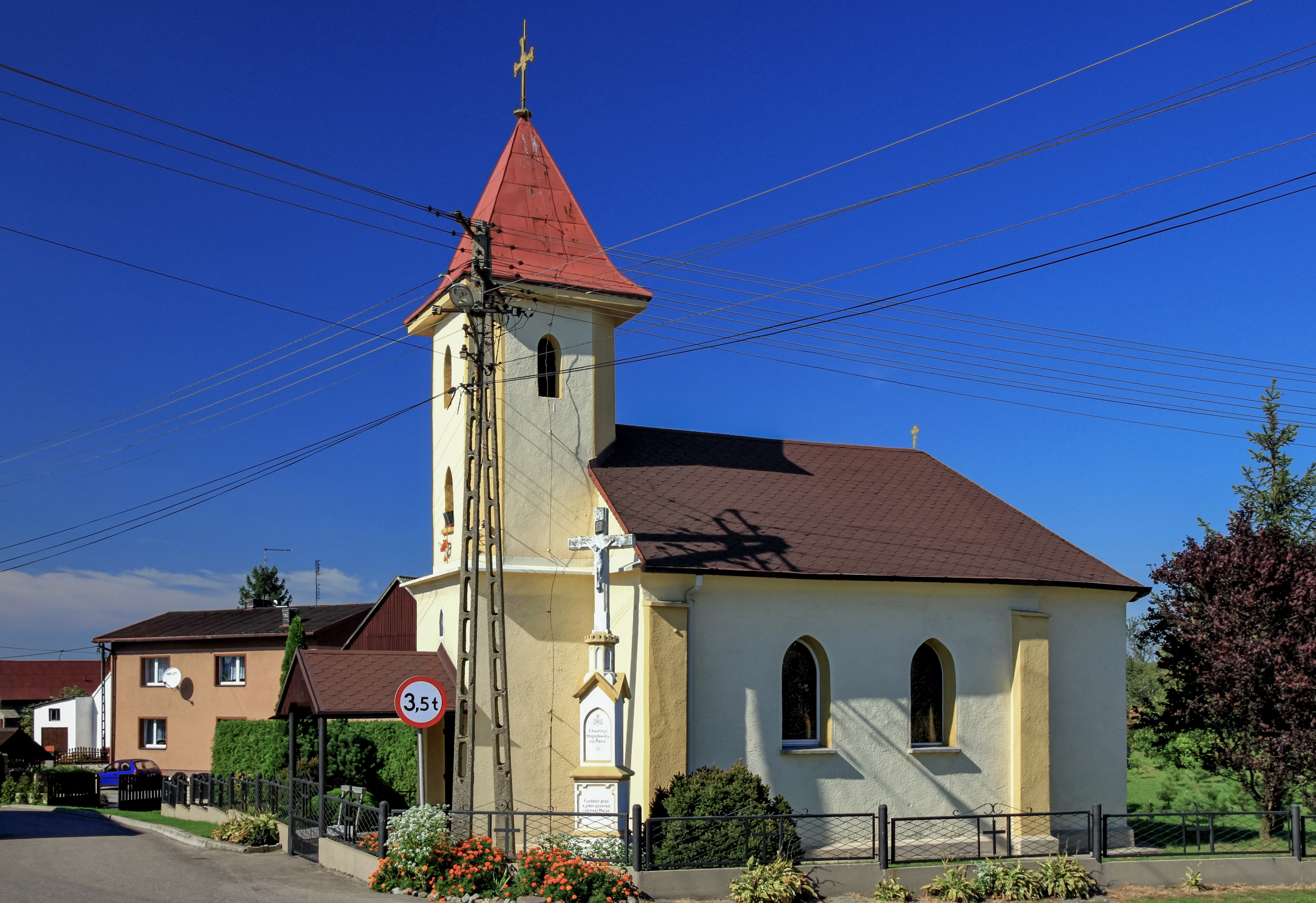
- Visitation of the Blessed Virgin Mary chapel.

- Coat of arms

- Location within Poland
- Coordinates: 49°56′42″N 18°22′55″E
- Country: Poland
- Voivodeship: Silesian
- County: Wodzisław
- Gmina: Gorzyce
- First mentioned: 1229

Government
  - Mayor: Krystyna Malcharczyk
- Area: 2.52 km^{2} (0.97 sq mi)
- Population: 338
  - Density: 134/km^{2} (347/sq mi)
- Time zone: UTC+1 (CET)
  - Summer (DST): UTC+2 (CEST)
- Car plates: SWD

Uchylsko [uˈxɨlskɔ] is a village in Gmina Gorzyce, Wodzisław County, Silesian Voivodeship, Poland, near the border with the Czech Republic. It was first mentioned in a written document in 1229.

The village was first mentioned in the document of Pope Gregory IX issued on 26 May 1229 among villages belonging to Benedictine abbey in Tyniec, as Uchilsko. Benedictine abbey in Orlová (established in 1268) in the late 13th century had rights to revenues from three villages in the Castellany of Racibórz, namely Gorzyce, Uchylsko and Gołkowice.
