= Bluszczów =

- Village
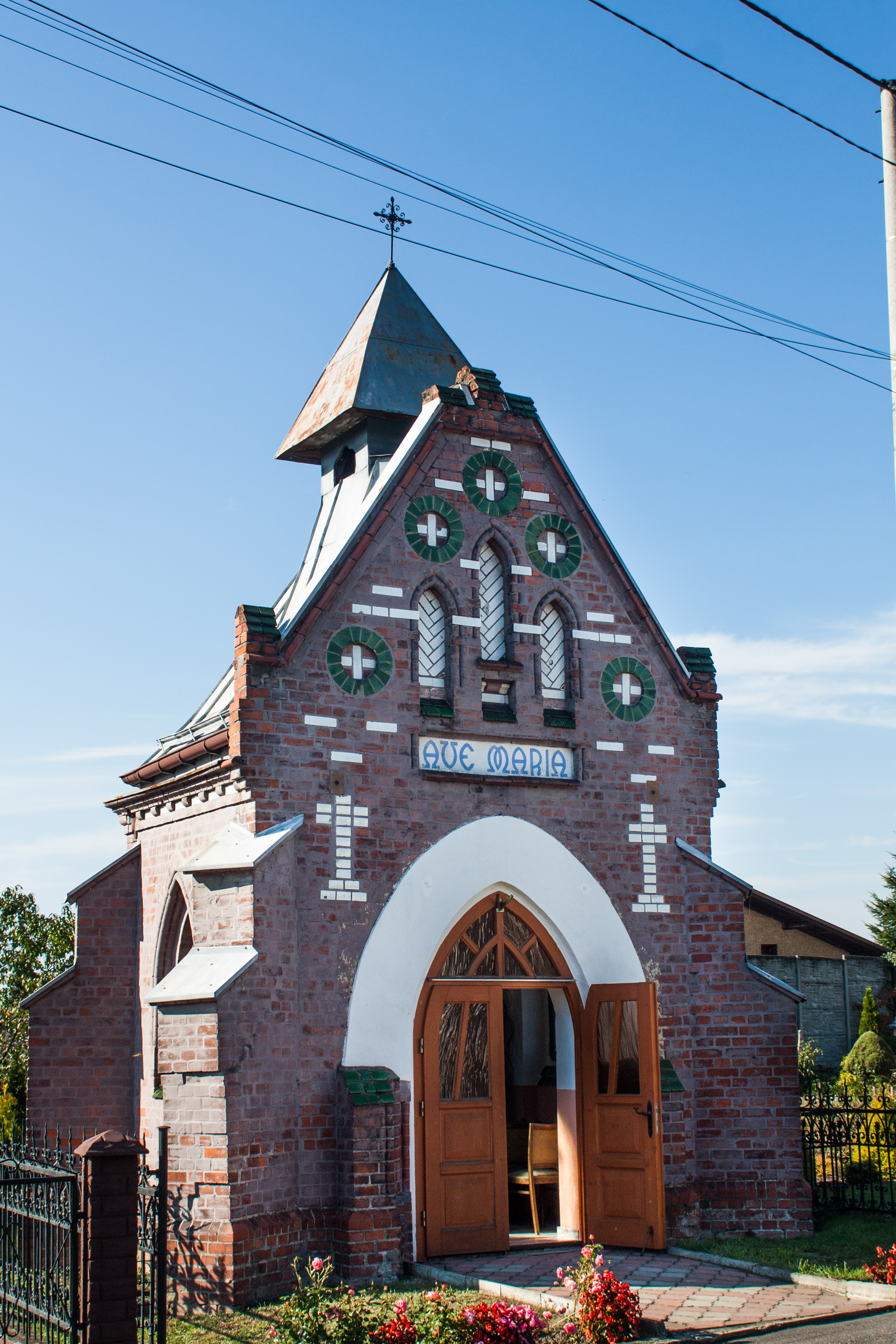
- Chapel of the Immaculate Conception of the Virgin Mary

- Coat of arms

- Location within Poland
- Coordinates: 49°59′37″N 18°19′54″E
- Country: Poland
- Voivodeship: Silesian
- County: Wodzisław
- Gmina: Gorzyce

Population
  - Total: 1,201
- Website: http://www.bluszczow.pl

Bluszczów [ˈbluʂt͡ʂuf] is a village in the administrative district of Gmina Gorzyce, within Wodzisław County, Silesian Voivodeship, in southern Poland, close to the Czech border.

In the village there was a railway station called "Bluszczów" probably to 2005 (this a reason there is a "Dworcowa" street, which means "Railway station", and usually is located in most town, cities in Poland where is or was building, sometimes railway stop/platform only).
