= Battle of Godow =

- Part of First Silesian Uprising
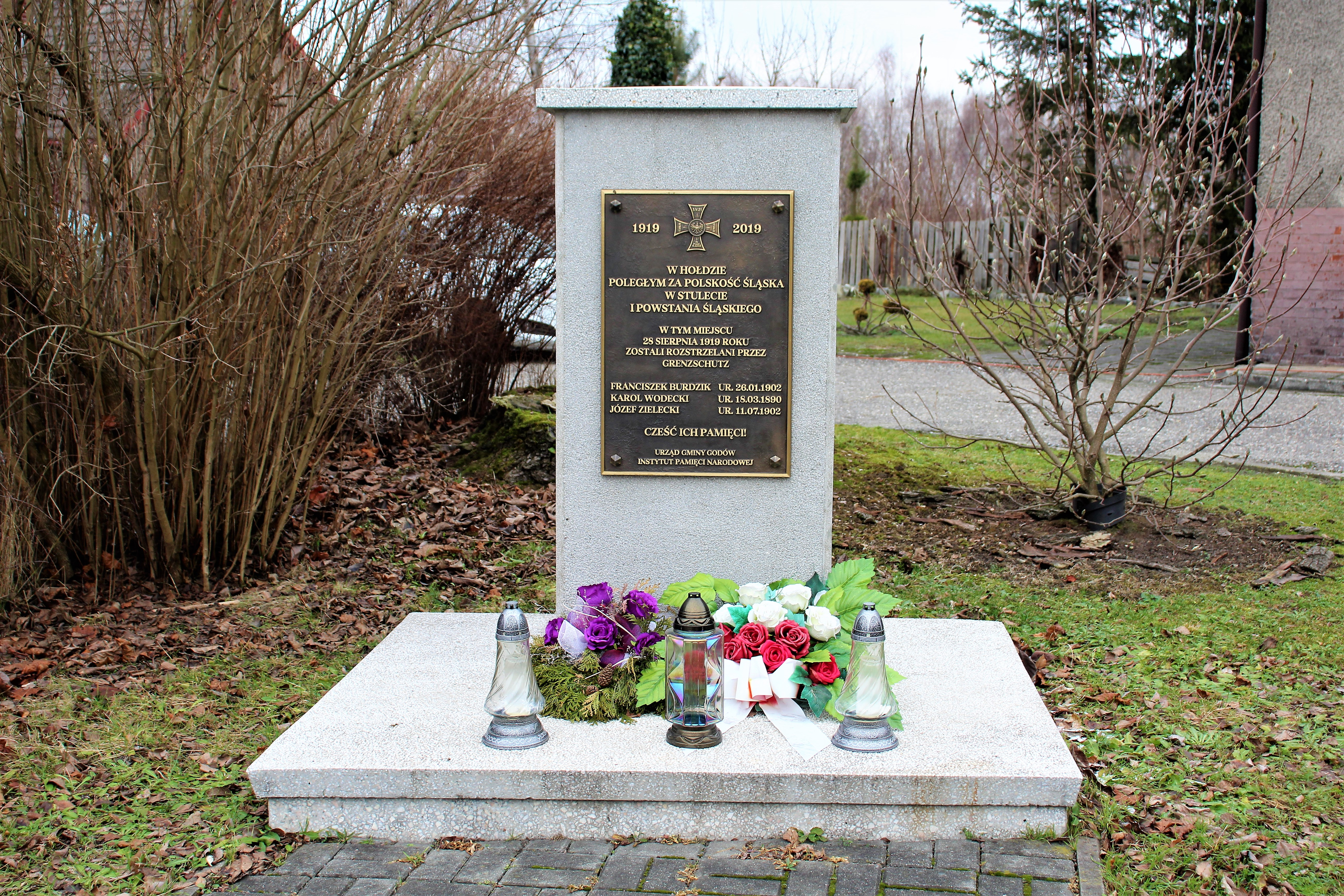
- Monument commemorating insurgents executed by the Grenzschutz in Godow on the 28 August 1919.
Date	17–18 August 1919
Location	Godow (Near Loslau), Germany
Result	Polish victory

Belligerents
POW G.Śl.	Weimar Republic

Commanders and leaders
First Battle: Maksymilian Iksal; Second Battle: Jan Wyglenda; Mikołaj Witczak	Lt Peters

Units involved
Piotrowice Insurgent Company	Grenzschutz Ost: Hasse Regiment

Strength
First Battle: 40 insurgents Second Battle: 100 insurgents; Including 1 HMG	58 soldiers; including 2 HMGs

Casualties and losses
1 wounded	30 killed, 16 taken prisoner (of which 8 wounded)

the Battle of Godow (Polish: Bitwa pod Godowem) was a battle during the First Silesian Uprising that occurred on 18 August 1919 in the town of Godow, and resulted in a Polish victory.

The battle was predated by an earlier attempted to capture the town by an insurgent company led by Maksymilian Iksal on August 17, which resulted in failure.

The strategic goal of the Battle of Godow was opening the road between Cieszyn Silesia and Loslau, which had been blockaded by German troops.

== First battle (August 17) ==
On August 17 at around 2:00 a.m. an insurgent company from the insurgent camp in Piotrowice (in Cieszyn Silesia) under the command of Maksymilian Iksal crossed into Upper Silesia; after capturing Golkowitz they marched on Godow. Iksal's unit intended on capturing the train station before marching onward into the Rybnik district and linking up with insurgent units fighting elsewhere. Ultimately however, The attack failed and Iksal left Upper Silesia soon thereafter for Warsaw where he requested support for the uprising, giving command of his unit to Franciszek Marszolik.

=== Aftermath of Iksal's attack ===
Upon hearing news about the outbreak of the uprising in Pleß district and the engagement of insurgents from Piotrowice Jan Wyglenda and Mikołaj Witczak, key members of the Polish Military Organization of Upper Silesia, made their way to the insurgent camp in Piotrowice on August 18, where they rallied insurgents in the camp before deciding to cross into Upper Silesia to support the uprising.

== Second Battle (August 18) ==
Having received reports of a large concentration of enemy forces on a hill near the train station in Godow, Jan Wyglenda and Mikołaj Witczak, commanding a 100-man strong insurgent unit (including insurgents who had captured Golkowitz the day before) marched on the town. Upon reaching the train station, the unit was subdivided into 3 smaller combat groups: commanded by Jan Wyglenda, Mikołaj Witczak and Jan Szczepański respectively.

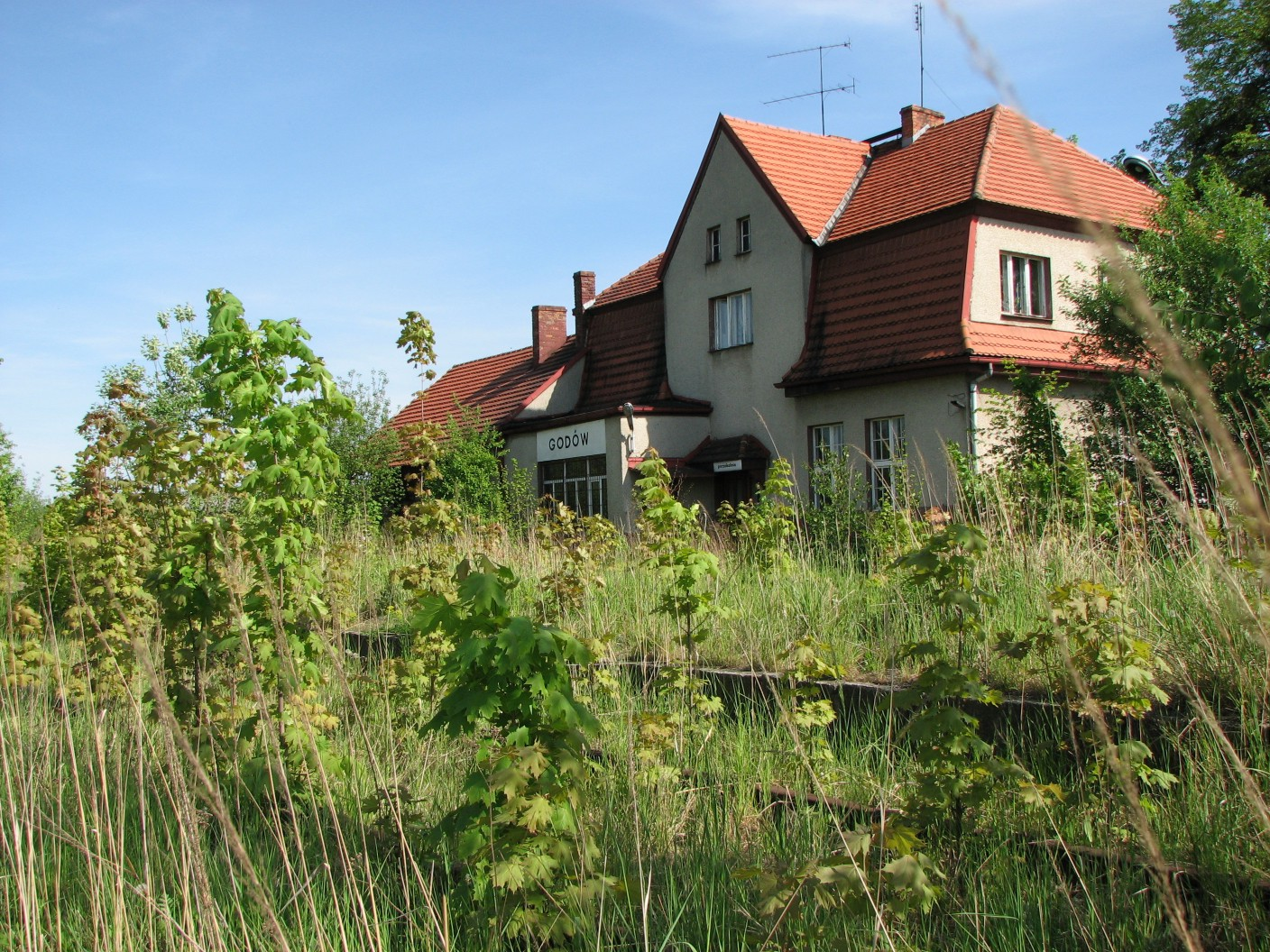
Train station in Godów.

The train station was guarded by 12 German soldiers, who, upon seeing the approaching insurgent unit fled. To avoid alerting the fortified enemy on the hill, the Silesian insurgents refrained from firing on the escaping soldiers.

Wyglenda's group approached the hill from the south while Witczak's group approached from the east before taking up position on the hill. Szczepański and his group stationed in a forest west of the train station. An insurgent named Józef Michalski, armed with dynamite, guarded a railway bridge at the train station, ready to blow it up if a German armoured train approached from the direction of Loslau.

When the Silesian insurgents commenced their attack, they were immediately met with enemy fire. The fortified German soldiers possessed two machine guns on the hilltop, which were ultimately silenced by machine gun fire from Witczak's group. Subsequently, the insurgents stormed and captured the hilltop despite enemy resistance, utilising grenades to break the enemy's defensive position.

== Aftermath ==
30 German soldiers fell defending the hill. Furthermore, 16 soldiers (of which 8 wounded) were taken into captivity; among the captives was Lieutenant Peters, the son of the mayor of Hamburg. The insurgents suffered no casualties, with only one insurgent wounded. Furthermore, the insurgents captured 46 rifles and 2 HMGs following the battle.

In retaliation for the insurgent attack in Godow, German soldiers barged into the school in Piotrowice, which served as a centre for Silesian refugees, and took 40 people hostage. Moreover, soldiers of the Grenzschutz Ost executed 5 insurgents in Moschczenitz in retaliation for the battle.

After the end of the First Silesian Uprising, on August 28 German soldiers executed three insurgents in Godow.

A monument was raised in Godów in 2019 commemorating the battle and the executed insurgents on August 28, 1919. Similarly, a monument in Wodzisław Śląski commemorates the battle.
