= Skrzyszów, Silesian Voivodeship =

Skrzyszów
- Village
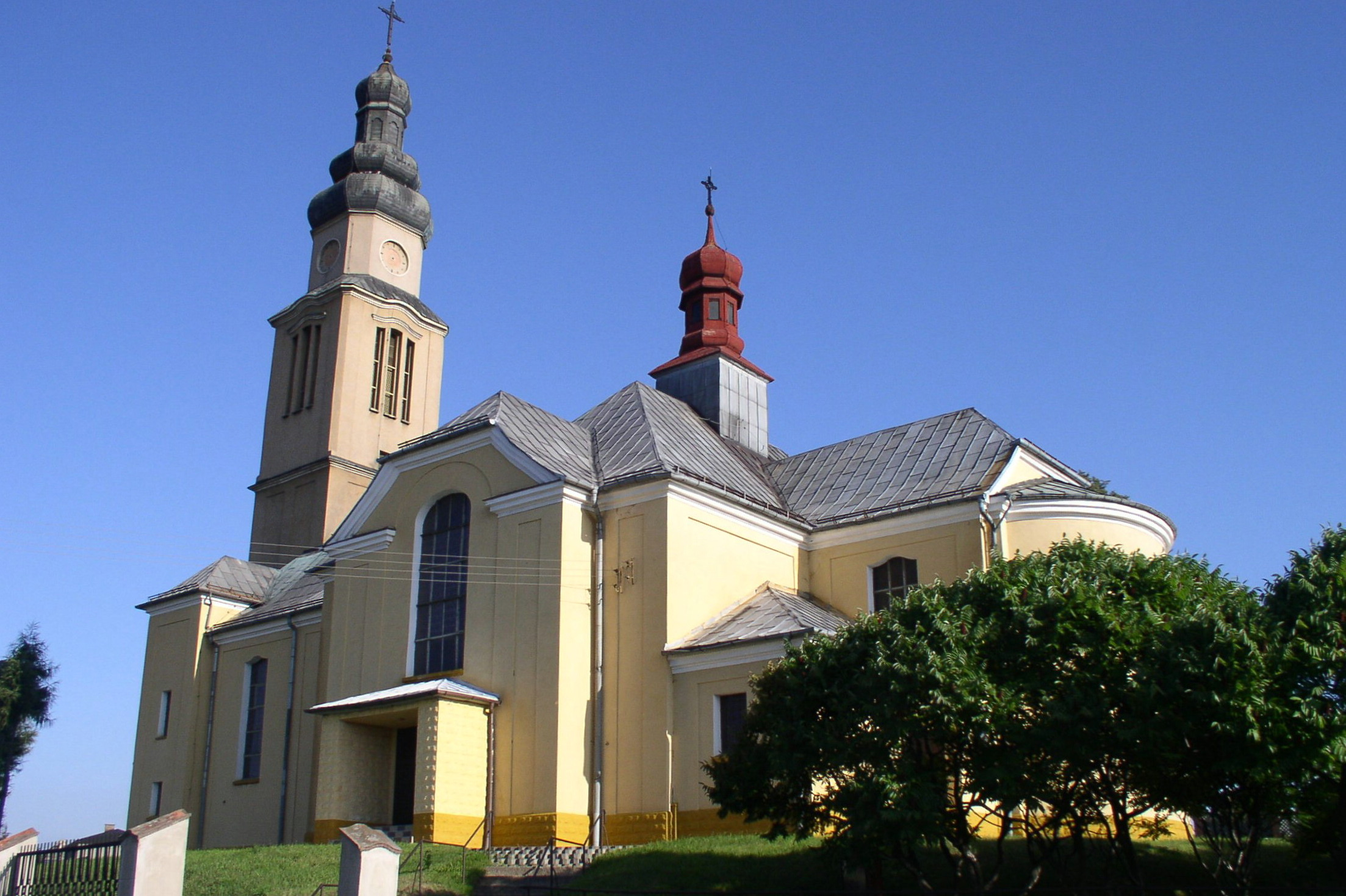
- Saint Archangel Michael Church

- Location within Poland
- Coordinates: 49°56′52″N 18°29′30″E
- Country: Poland
- Voivodeship: Silesian
- County: Wodzisław
- Gmina: Godów
- First mentioned: 1286

Government
  - Mayor: Henryk Holesz
- Area: 11.56 km^{2} (4.46 sq mi)
- Population (2006): 3,280
  - Density: 284/km^{2} (735/sq mi)
- Time zone: UTC+1 (CET)
  - Summer (DST): UTC+2 (CEST)
- Postal code: 44-348
- Car plates: SWD
- Website: http://www.skrzyszow.org/

Skrzyszów [ˈskʂɨʂuf] is a village in Gmina Godów, Wodzisław County, Silesian Voivodeship, southern Poland. It lies close to the border with the Czech Republic.
