= Dolní Lutyně =

- Municipality
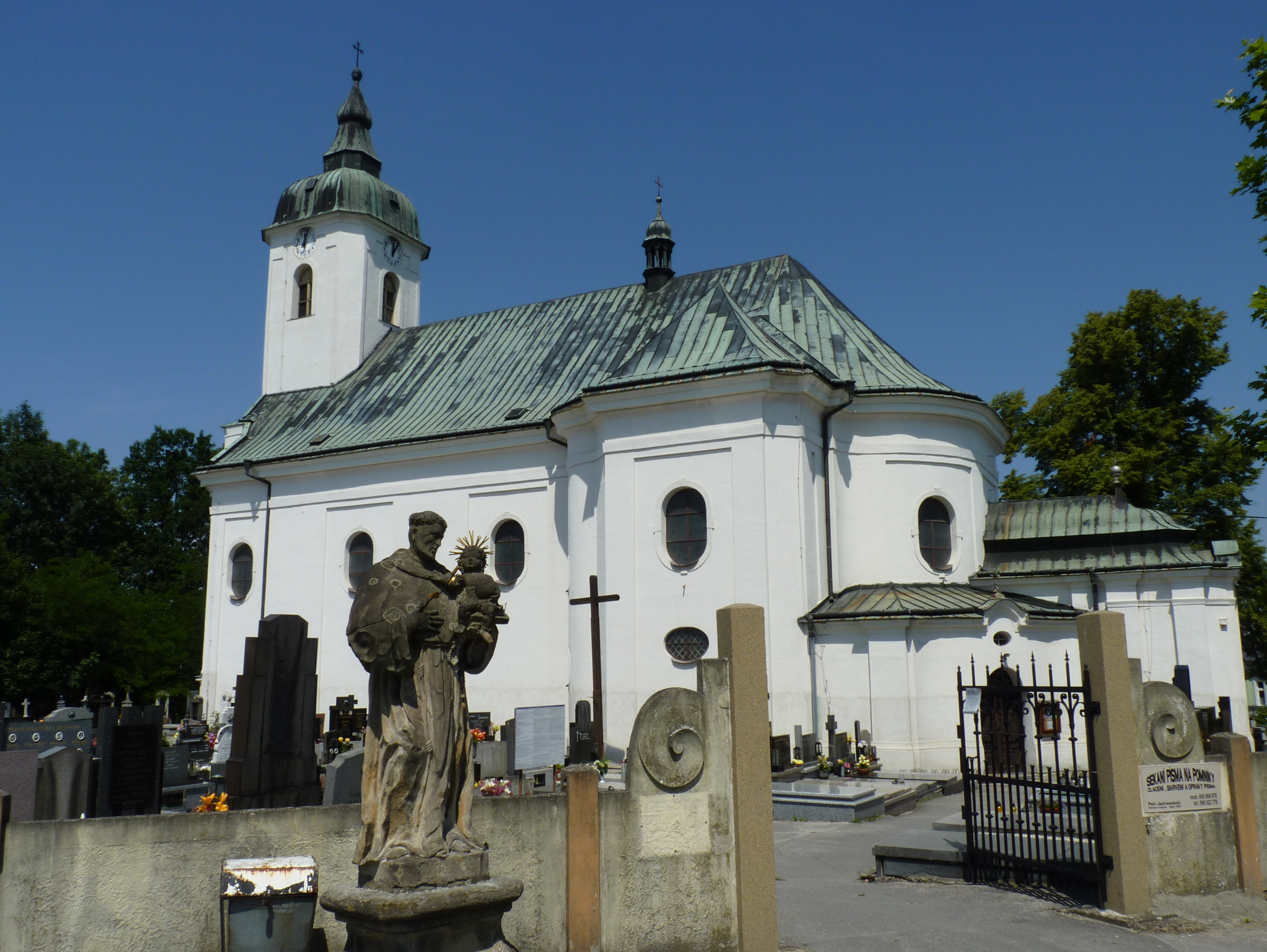
- Church of Saint John the Baptist

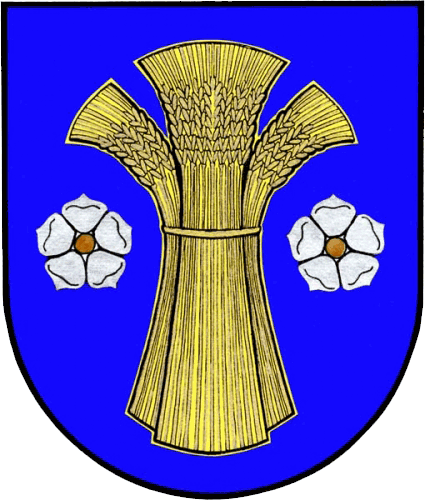
- Flag Coat of arms

- Location in the Czech Republic
- Coordinates: 49°53′58″N 18°25′15″E
- Country: Czech Republic
- Region: Moravian-Silesian
- District: Karviná
- First mentioned: 1305

Area
  - Total: 24.88 km^{2} (9.61 sq mi)
- Elevation: 202 m (663 ft)

Population (2026-01-01)
  - Total: 5,350
  - Density: 215/km^{2} (557/sq mi)
- Time zone: UTC+1 (CET)
  - Summer (DST): UTC+2 (CEST)
- Postal code: 735 53
- Website: www.dolnilutyne.org

Dolní Lutyně (Czech pronunciation: [ˈdolɲiː ˈlutɪɲɛ]; Polish: Lutynia Dolna, German: Deutsch Leuten or Nieder Leuten) is a municipality and village in Karviná District in the Moravian-Silesian Region of the Czech Republic. It has about 5,400 inhabitants, making it one of the most populous Czech municipalities without the town status.

== Administrative division ==
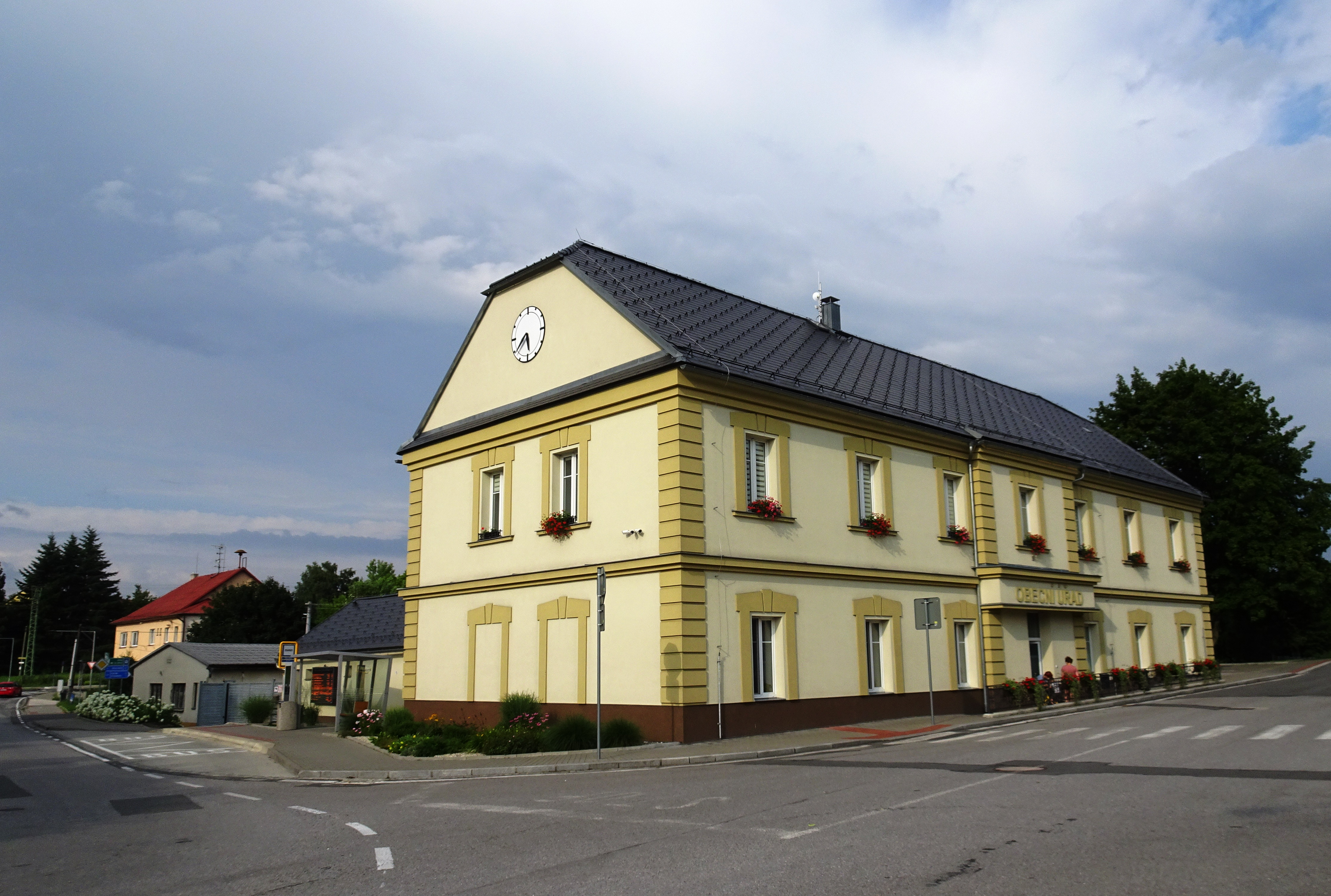
Municipal office

Dolní Lutyně consists of two municipal parts (in brackets population according to the 2021 census):

- Dolní Lutyně (4,414)
- Věřňovice (636)

== Geography ==
Dolní Lutyně is located about 8 kilometres (5 mi) northwest of Karviná and 10 km (6 mi) northeast of Ostrava, on the border with Poland. It lies in the Ostrava Basin, in the historical region of Cieszyn Silesia. The border is partly formed by the Olza River. In the municipal territory are several fishponds and an artificial lake created by flooding a sand quarry.

In the area around the Olza are riparian forests with two nature monuments, called Věřňovice and Niva Olše – Věřňovice.

== History ==
The village could have been founded by Benedictine monks from an Orlová monastery, and also it could be a part of a larger settlement campaign taking place in the late 13th century on the territory of what will be later known as Upper Silesia. The first written mention of Lutyně is in a Latin document of Diocese of Wrocław called Liber fundationis episcopatus Vratislaviensis from 1305 as Luthina.

Politically the village belonged initially to the Duchy of Teschen, a fee of Kingdom of Bohemia, which after 1526 became part of the Habsburg monarchy.

The large village was later in the 14th century subdivided into two sister settlements. Dolní Lutyně was then known for centuries as "German" (Theutonicum), and the other as "Polish" (Polonicum), now known as Lutyně within Orlová. In 1450 they were together mentioned as Lutynie utrumque Theutonicum et Polonicum.

German Lutyně became a seat of a Catholic parish, mentioned in the register of Peter's Pence payment from 1447 among 50 parishes of Teschen deaconry as Lutina.

From 1700, Lutyně was a property of Taaffe counts who built there a baroque castle as their summer residence. In 1792, Lutyně was acquired by the Moennich family. They used the coal presence for the economic development of the region.

After World War I, Polish–Czechoslovak War and the division of Cieszyn Silesia in 1920, the village became a part of Czechoslovakia. Following the Munich Agreement, in October 1938 together with the Trans-Olza region it was annexed by Poland, administratively organised in Frysztat County of Silesian Voivodeship. The village was then annexed by Nazi Germany at the beginning of World War II. After the war it was restored to Czechoslovakia.

== Demographics ==
According to the 2021 Census, the Polish minority made up 3.7% of the population.

Historical population

Year	Pop.	±%
1869	2,334	—
1880	2,748	+17.7%
1890	3,127	+13.8%
1900	3,914	+25.2%
1910	4,724	+20.7%

Year	Pop.	±%
1921	4,884	+3.4%
1930	5,447	+11.5%
1950	4,588	−15.8%
1961	4,893	+6.6%
1970	4,880	−0.3%

Year	Pop.	±%
1980	4,726	−3.2%
1991	4,469	−5.4%
2001	4,771	+6.8%
2011	4,966	+4.1%
2021	5,050	+1.7%

Source: Censuses

== Transport ==
The D1 motorway passes through the northern part of the municipal territory. On the motorway is the road border crossing Věřňovice (D1) / Gorzyczki to Poland. The I/67 road from Český Těšín to Bohumín runs across the municipality.

Dolní Lutyně is located on the railway lines Ostrava–Mosty u Jablunkova and Petrovice u Karviné–Mošnov.

== Sights ==
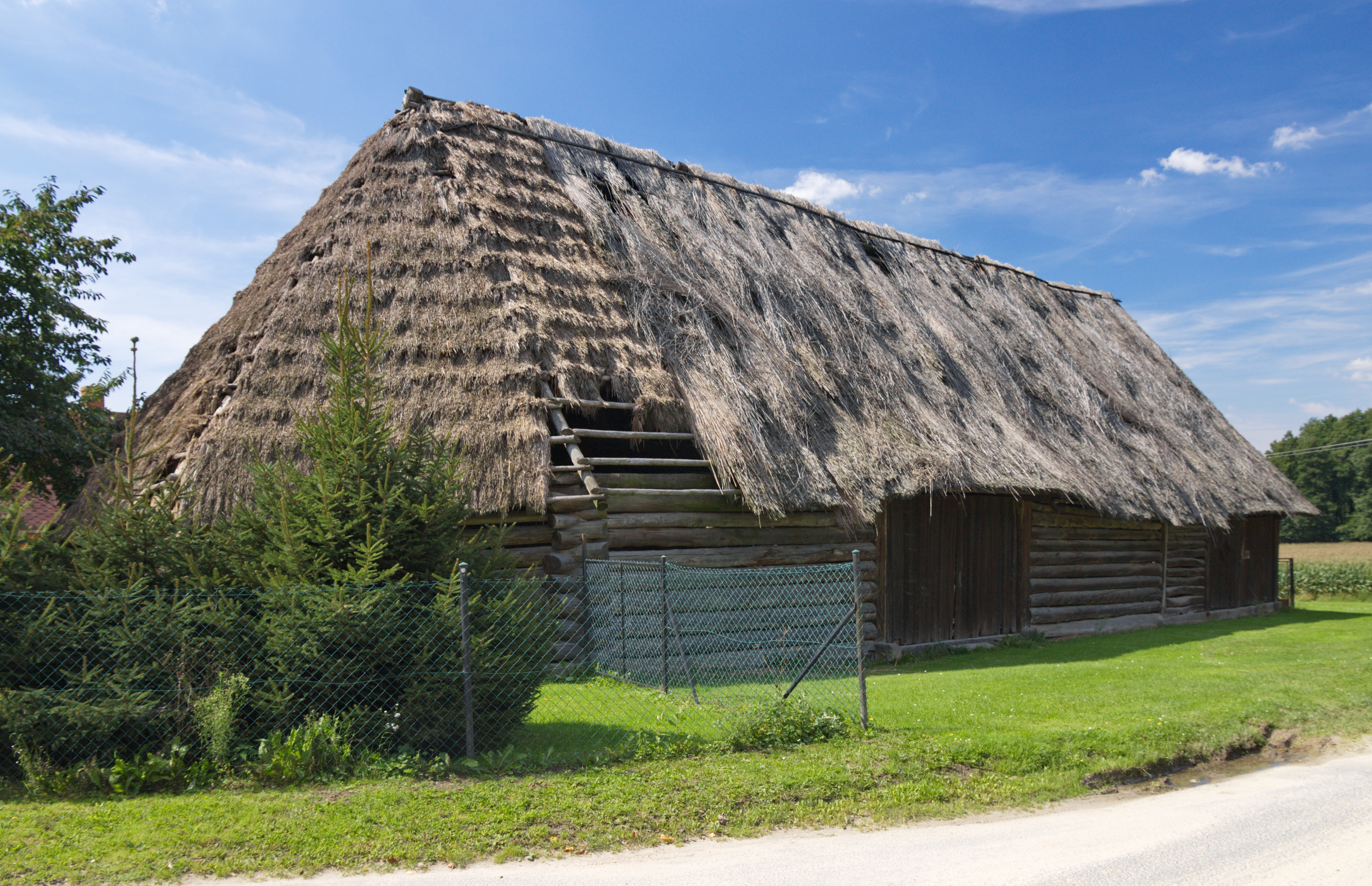
The barn

The Church of Saint John the Baptist was built in the Baroque style in 1740–1746 and replaced an old wooden Catholic church. The appearance of the original church with a statue of St. John of Nepomuk, which is older than the new church, has been preserved. In the bell tower is a rare Renaissance bell from the late 15th or early 16th century.

A historical monument is a preserved barn from 1805.

The former Baroque castle is only partially preserved and is in a desolate state.

== Notable people ==
- Rudolf Paszek (1894–1969), Polish teacher and politician

== Twin towns – sister cities ==
Dolní Lutyně is twinned with:

- Godów, Poland
- Gorzyce, Poland
