= Bełsznica =

- Village
- Coat of arms

- Location within Poland
- Coordinates: 49°59′N 18°22′E
- Country: Poland
- Voivodeship: Silesian
- County: Wodzisław
- Gmina: Gorzyce
- Population: 1,171 (2,021)

Bełsznica [bɛu̯ʂˈnit͡sa] is a village in the administrative district of Gmina Gorzyce, within Wodzisław County, Silesian Voivodeship, in southern Poland, close to the Czech border.

== Location ==
Geographically, Bełsznica lies near the hills of the Rybnik Plateau. From the hill located 256m above sea level one can see the valleys of the Olza and Odra rivers, as well as the Moravian Gate. Historically, the village is located in Upper Silesia. In the village there also lies the Bełsznica Train Stop.

== Naming ==
The name of the village probably comes from a plant of the same name. In an alphabetical list of towns released in Wrocław in 1830 by Johann Georg Knie the village is named in German as Belschnitz and in Polish Belśnice.
