= Dolní Žukov =

Coordinates: 49°43′12″N 18°35′28″E

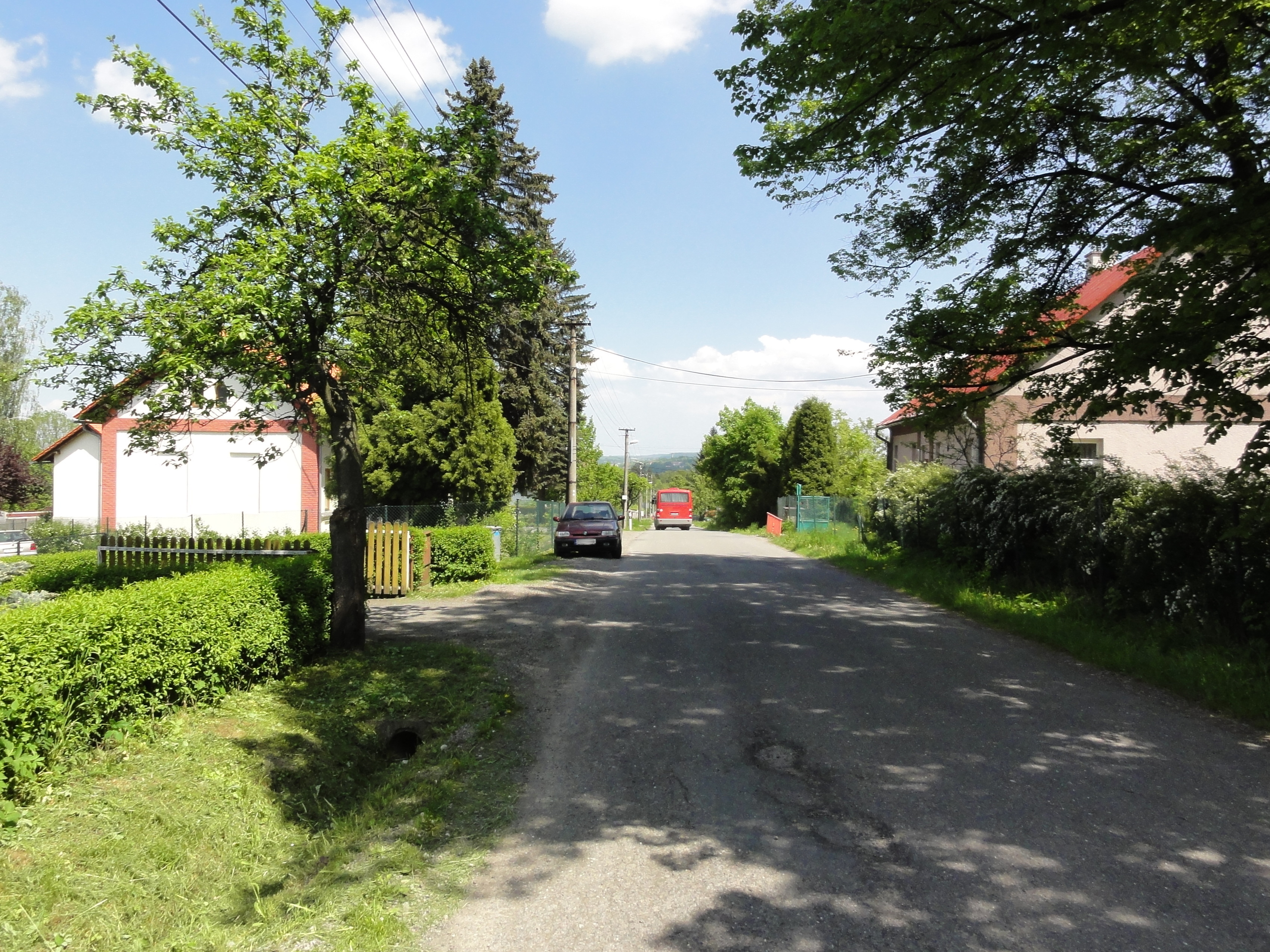
Centre of the village with a library and kindergarten

Dolní Žukov (Polish: Żuków Dolny, German: Nieder Zukau) is a village in Karviná District, Moravian-Silesian Region, Czech Republic. It was a separate municipality but became administratively a part of Czech Teschen in 1960. It has a population of 1,064 (2005).

The name of the village is possessive in origin derived from personal name Żuk (żuk means also a beetle).

== History ==
The village of Žukov was first mentioned in the document of Pope Gregory IX issued for Benedictine abbey in Tyniec in 1229 as Zukow. Politically it belonged then to the Duchy of Opole and Racibórz, and since 1290 to the Duchy of Teschen. It was also a property of Benedictine monastery in Orlová founded around 1268. Probably because of financial problems the Benedictines sold part of the village, which later became known as Horní Žukov.

In 1526 the Duchy of Teschen became a part of the Habsburg monarchy.

After Revolutions of 1848 in the Austrian Empire a modern municipal division was introduced in the re-established Austrian Silesia. The village as a municipality was subscribed to the political and legal district of Cieszyn. According to the censuses conducted in 1880, 1890, 1900 and 1910 the population of the municipality grew from 692 in 1880 to 1,165 in 1910 with the majority being native Polish-speakers (between 96.8% and 99.5%) accompanied by a small German-speaking minority (at most 26 or 3.2% in 1890) and Czech-speaking (at most 9 or 0.8% in 1910). In terms of religion in 1910 the majority were Protestants (70.7%), followed by Roman Catholics (28.9%) and Jews (5 people). The village was also traditionally inhabited by Cieszyn Vlachs, speaking Cieszyn Silesian dialect.

After World War I, fall of Austria-Hungary, Polish–Czechoslovak War and the division of Cieszyn Silesia in 1920, it became a part of Czechoslovakia. Following the Munich Agreement, in October 1938 together with the Zaolzie region it was annexed by Poland, administratively adjoined to Cieszyn County of Silesian Voivodeship. It was then annexed by Nazi Germany at the beginning of World War II. After the war it was restored to Czechoslovakia.

== See also ==
- Polish minority in the Czech Republic
- Zaolzie
