= Skrbeńsko =

- Village
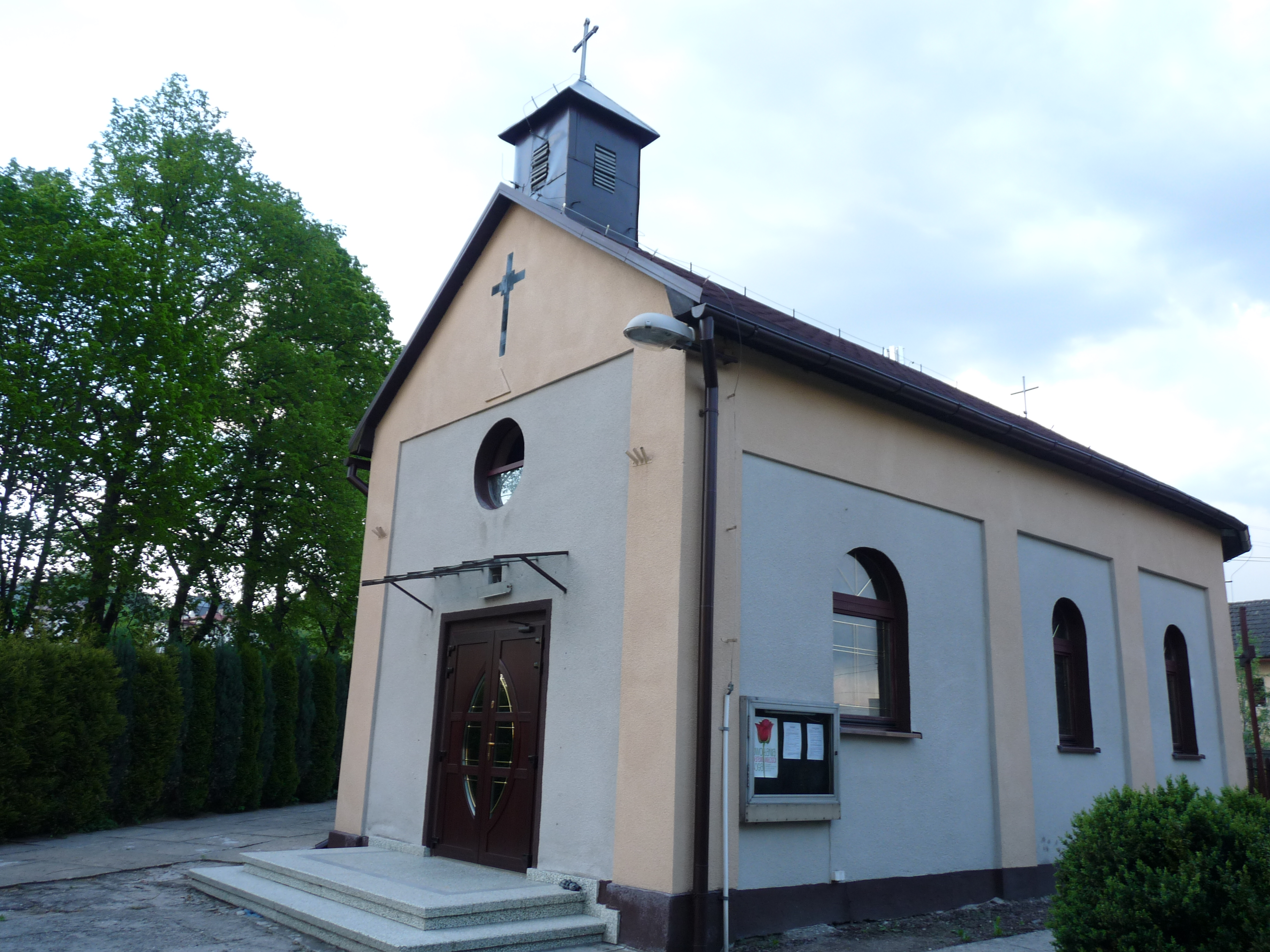
- A local church

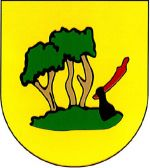
- Coat of arms

- Location within Poland
- Coordinates: 49°54′24″N 18°31′40″E
- Country: Poland
- Voivodeship: Silesian
- County: Wodzisław
- Gmina: Godów
- Established: 1775

Government
  - Mayor: Franciszek Moczała
- Area: 1.19 km^{2} (0.46 sq mi)
- Population: 817
  - Density: 687/km^{2} (1,780/sq mi)
- Time zone: UTC+1 (CET)
  - Summer (DST): UTC+2 (CEST)
- Postal code: 44-341
- Car plates: SWD

Skrbeńsko [ˈskrbɛɲskɔ] is a village in Gmina Godów, Wodzisław County, Silesian Voivodeship, southern Poland. It lies on the border with the Czech Republic.

It was established in 1775 as a colony within Gołkowice, Silesian Voivodeship by Maksymilian von Skrbenski, and year later formed a separate municipality.
