= Olza, Silesian Voivodeship =

Olza
- Village
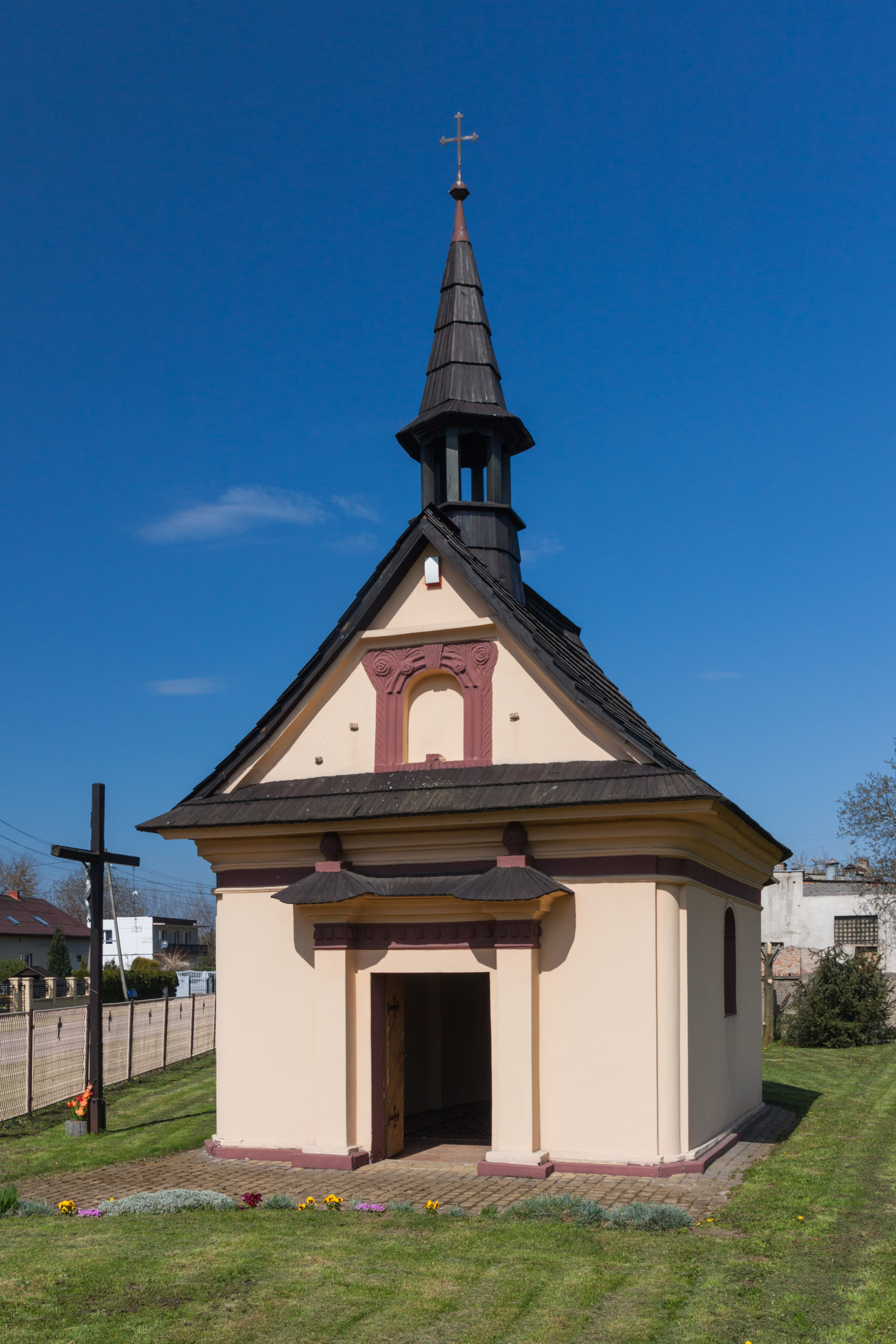
- Chapel of the Holy Family

- Coat of arms

- Location within Poland
- Coordinates: 49°57′15″N 18°20′21″E
- Country: Poland
- Voivodeship: Silesian
- County: Wodzisław
- Gmina: Gorzyce
- First mentioned: 1239

Government
  - Mayor: Józef Kopystyński
- Area: 5.66 km^{2} (2.19 sq mi)
- Population: 1,694
  - Density: 299/km^{2} (775/sq mi)
- Time zone: UTC+1 (CET)
  - Summer (DST): UTC+2 (CEST)
- Postal code: 44-353
- Car plates: SWD

Olza is a village in Gmina Gorzyce, Wodzisław County, Silesian Voivodeship, Poland. It lies on the Olza River, on the border with the Czech Republic. It is the last settlement located on the Olza River before its confluence with the Odra River.
