= Solca (Karviná) =

Abandoned village in Karviná, Czech Republic

Coordinates: 49°49′46″N 18°31′15″E

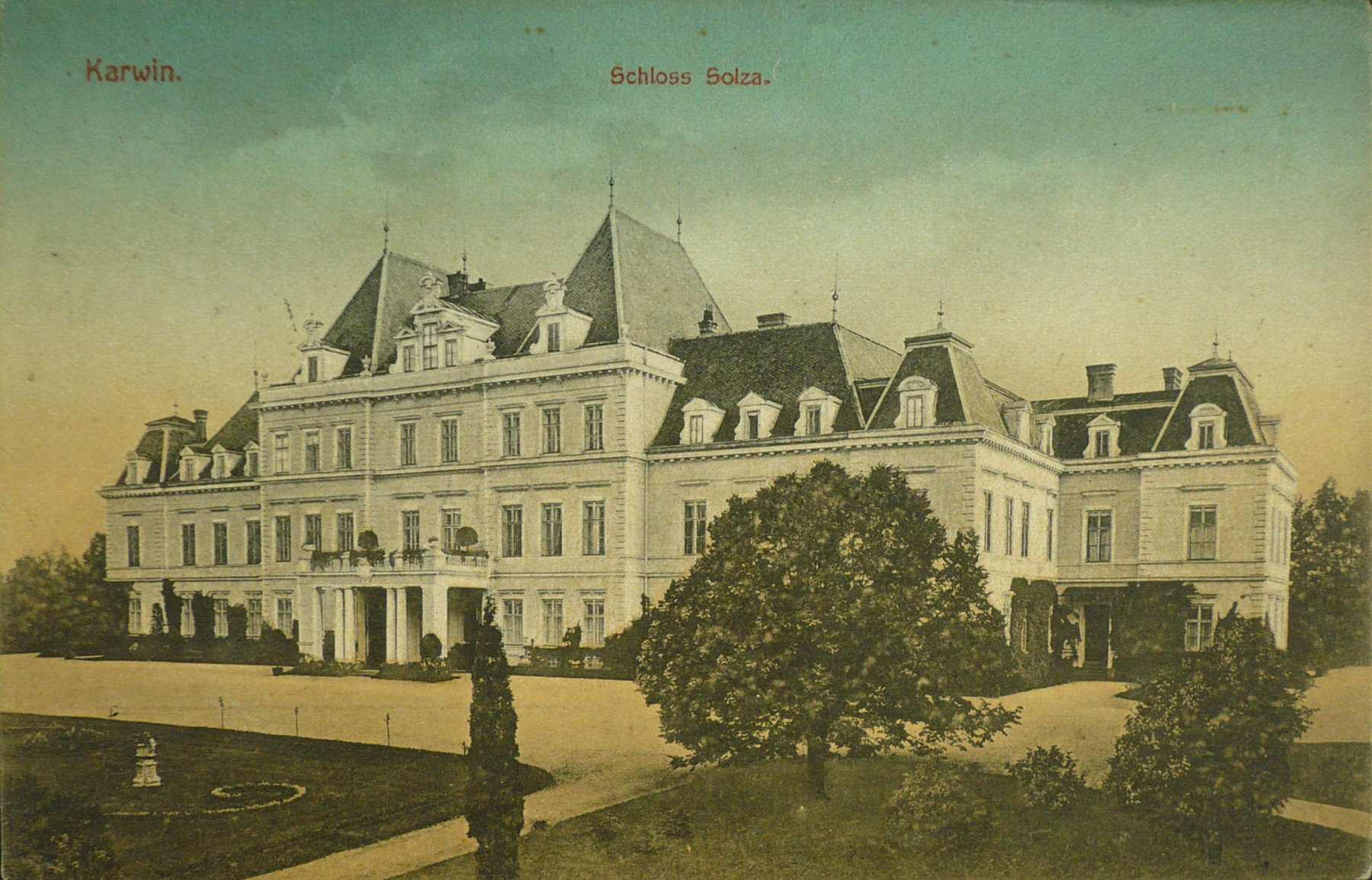
Solca palace, old postcard

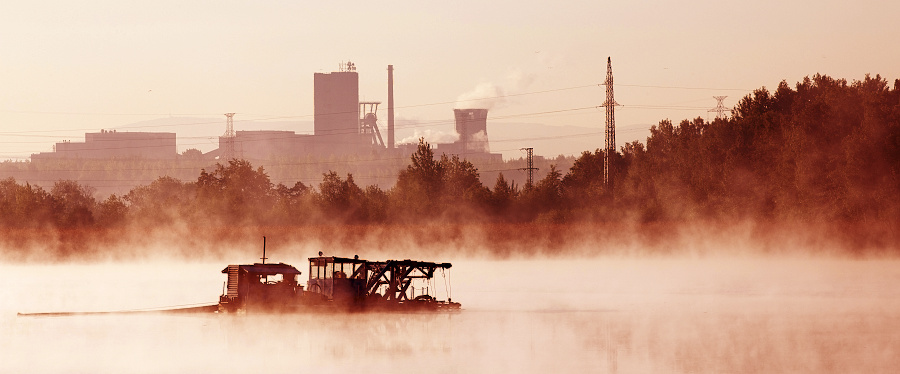
A pond of tailings, which now covers a part of the village's former area

Solca (Polish: Solca, German: Solza) is an abandoned village within the municipal territory of the city of Karviná in the Moravian-Silesian Region in the Czech Republic.

== History ==
Solca was one of the oldest villages in Cieszyn Silesia. A document of Bishop of Wrocław issued on 23 May 1223 for Norbertine Sisters in Rybnik includes a following excerpt:

Decimas videlicet ipsius ville Ribnich, Smolna, Zalese, Knegnizi, quam ultimam villam recepit ecclesia de Ribnich ab ecclesia de Sale, in concambium pro villa Golconis

Except for Sale all the mentioned villages were lying in the vicinity of Rybnik, thus it is problematic to localise where the settlement was supposed to be. Some historians identify it with Solca. The village had already a church (ecclesia), undoubtedly one of the oldest in the region, perhaps built during the reign of Mieszko I Tanglefoot. Again the village was mentioned in 1229 in the document of Pope Gregory IX issued for Benedictine abbey in Tyniec as Sal, leaving no doubts to its localisation close to Orlová. The village with an inn was endowed to Orlová abbey founded in 1268, and attested in the associated document again as Sal. In the next centuries the name of the village evolved into Solec/Solca.

Politically the village belonged initially to the Duchy of Opole and Racibórz and Castellany of Cieszyn, which was in 1290 formed in the process of feudal fragmentation of Poland into the Duchy of Teschen, and was ruled by a local branch of Piast dynasty. In 1327 the duchy became a fee of Kingdom of Bohemia, which after 1526 became part of the Habsburg monarchy. Before the end of Middle Ages ownership of the village had changed, first it became a propriety of the Cieszyn dukes, then of noble families. In 1570 it belonged to Jerzy Larisch from Lhota, the owner of Karviná. The Larisch family gradually enlarged their belongings, since 1730 administered as fideikomis.

After the discovery of black coal in Karviná in 1776, many miners and workers came and settled there. The village developed quickly since then. In 1873 a château was built there by the Larisch family. In the surrounding park, the family chapel and tomb were built. In 1894-1897 a Neo-Renaissance Saint Henry church was constructed. The Viennese architect Cerny, inspired by the Basilica of Santa Croce in Florence, planned the church for the growing community and the new building was able to house 4,000 worshippers.

According to the Austrian census of 1910 the village had 1,047 inhabitants, 1,021 of whom had permanent residence there. The census asked people for their native language, 819 (80.2%) were Polish-speaking and 165 (16.1%) were German-speaking. The most populous religious group were Roman Catholics with 930 (88.8%) followed by Protestants with 109 (10.4%).

After the World War I, fall of Austria-Hungary, Polish–Czechoslovak War and division of Cieszyn Silesia, Solca contained within Karviná became a part of Czechoslovakia. In October 1938 as a part of Trans-Olza it was annexed by Poland. After German invasion of Poland in 1939, the area became a part of Nazi Germany until 1945. After the war, the 1920 borders were restored.

Solca virtually disappeared, when the population moved to nearby towns and villages in the 1950s and 1960s, as Solca was extensively undermined due to the coal mining in the area. Communist authorities destroyed most of the buildings afterwards. The château was demolished in 1953, the church in 1960, the Larisch-Mönnich family tomb in 1985.
