= Krostoszowice =

- Village
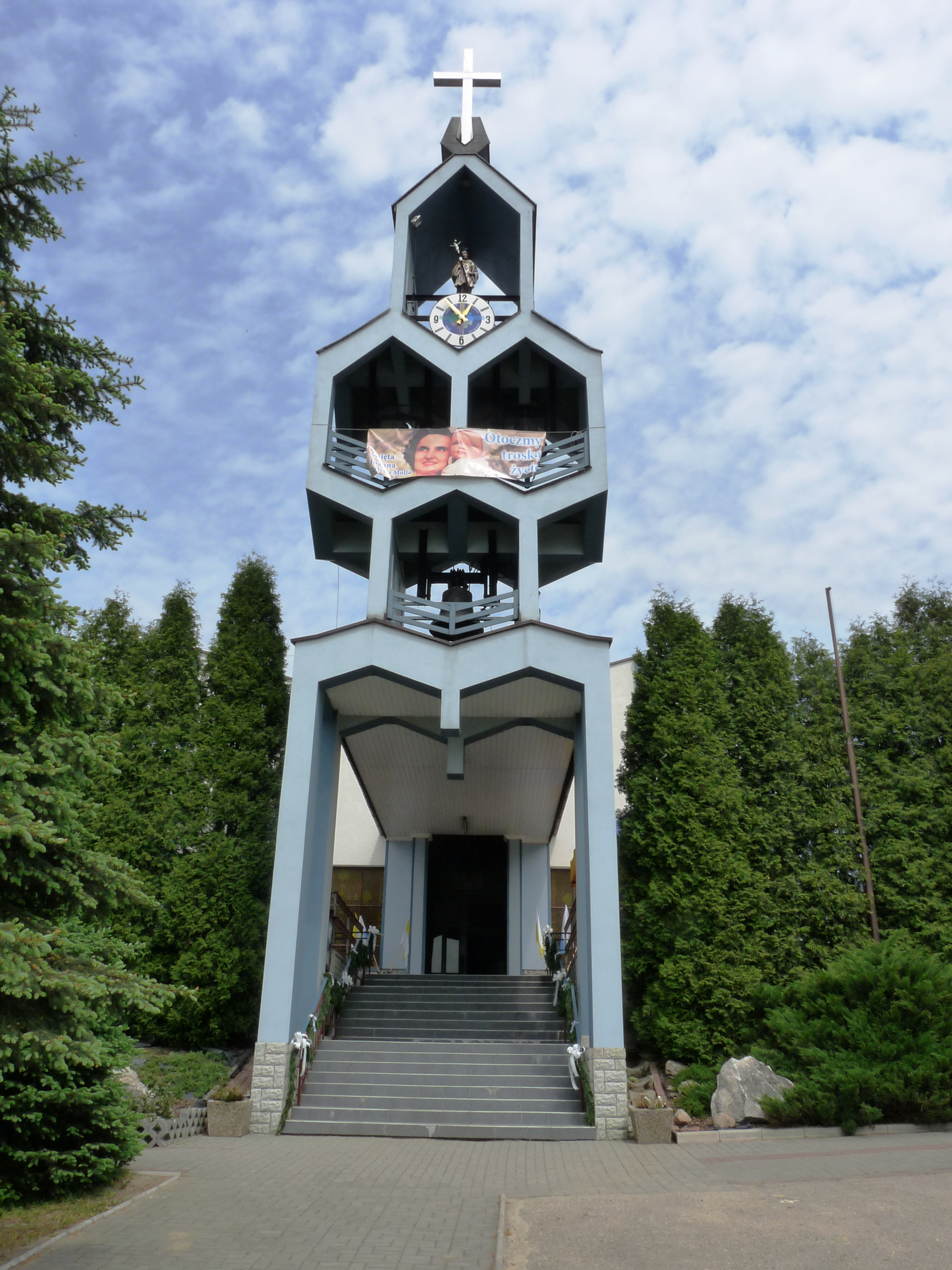
- Catholic church

- Location within Poland
- Coordinates: 49°57′28.8″N 18°28′27.5″E
- Country: Poland
- Voivodeship: Silesian
- County: Wodzisław
- Gmina: Godów

Government
  - Mayor: Wiesław Krzyżok
- Area: 2.67 km^{2} (1.03 sq mi)
- Population: 988
  - Density: 370/km^{2} (958/sq mi)
- Time zone: UTC+1 (CET)
  - Summer (DST): UTC+2 (CEST)
- Postal code: 44-348
- Car plates: SWD

Krostoszowice [krɔstɔʂɔˈvit͡sɛ] is a village in Gmina Godów, Wodzisław County, Silesian Voivodeship, southern Poland.
