= Věřňovice =

Coordinates: 49°55′37″N 18°25′0″E

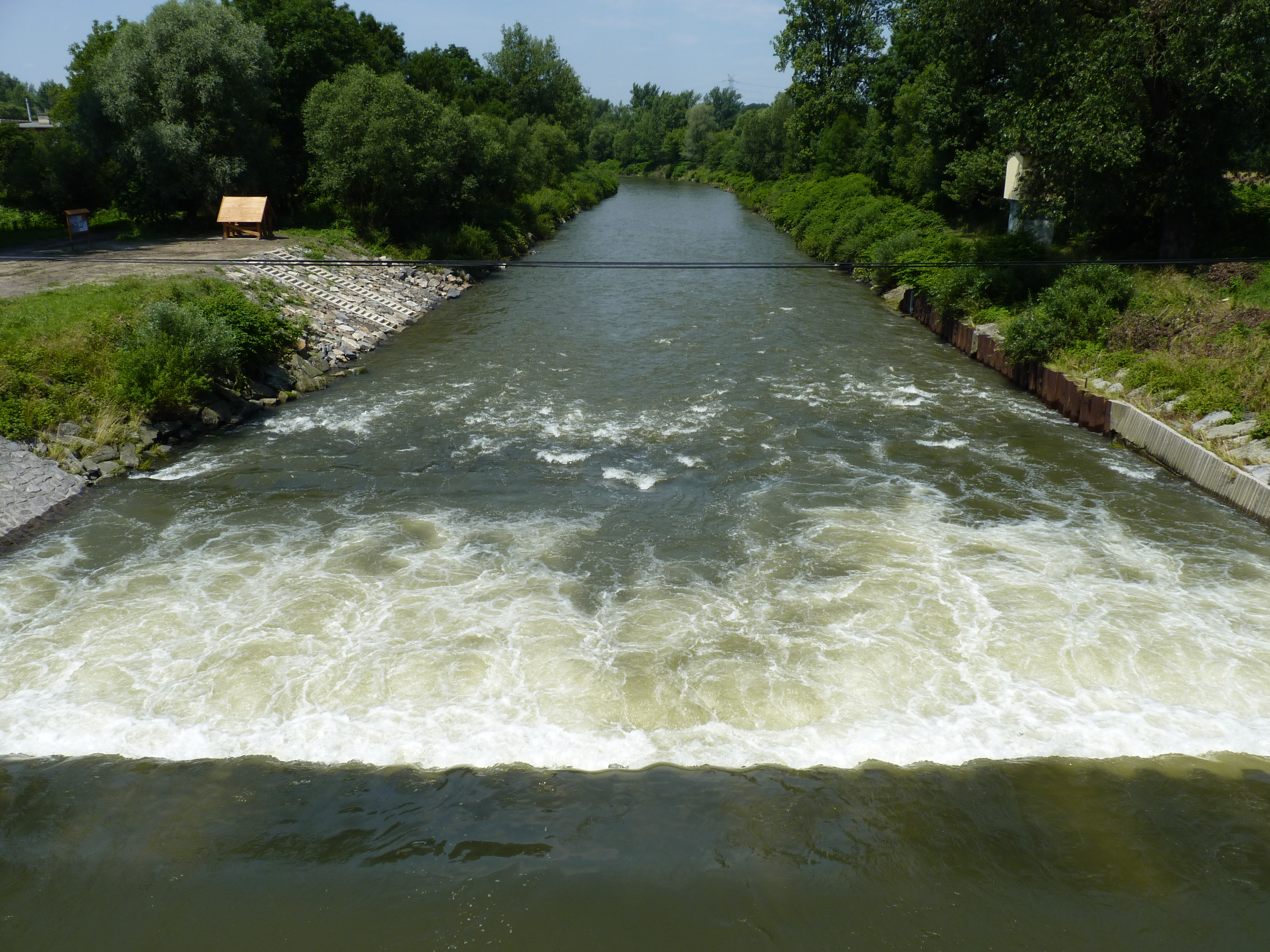
Olza River in the village

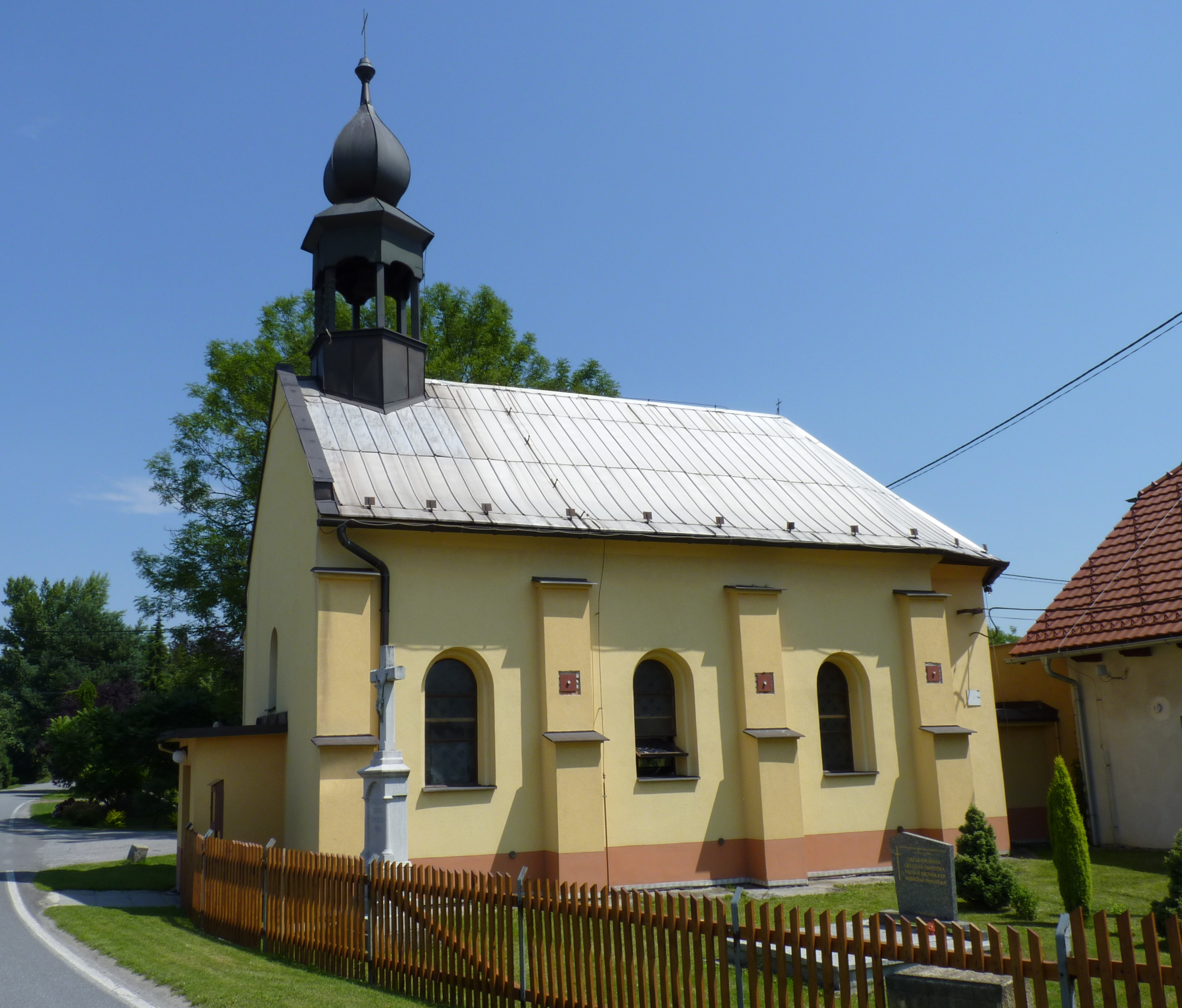
Saint Isidore Chapel

Věřňovice (Polish: Wierzniowice, German: Willmersdorf) is a village in Karviná District, Moravian-Silesian Region, Czech Republic. It was a separate municipality but became administratively a part of Dolní Lutyně in 1975. It lies on the border with Poland, in the historical region of Cieszyn Silesia.

The Olza River flows through the village. Part of the river with its alluvium and surroundings is a unique environment with a fragile nature balance. In an otherwise industrialized and densely populated region, it is quite special, and hence is protected.

== History ==
The village was first mentioned in a Latin document of Diocese of Wrocław called Liber fundationis episcopatus Vratislaviensis from around 1305 as item in Wernheri villa debent esse decem mansi in the section of Iste sunt ville circa Zary et Wladislaviam (Those are the villages near Żory and Wodzisław).

The next mention of the owner of Wernersdorf was in 1362. The name indicates ethnically German settlement. It was later polonised (Wiernyerzowicze in 1447), but also regermanized as Wilmersdorf (1804), the name actually not connected to Wernersdorf.

Politically the village belonged initially to the Duchy of Racibórz, later to the Duchy of Teschen, both ruled by a local branch of Piast dynasty. It is not known when it was transferred from one to the other. In 1327 both duchies became a fee of Kingdom of Bohemia, which after 1526 became part of the Habsburg monarchy.

After World War I, fall of Austria-Hungary, Polish–Czechoslovak War and the division of Cieszyn Silesia in 1920, the village became a part of Czechoslovakia. Following the Munich Agreement, in October 1938 together with the Zaolzie region it was annexed by Poland, administratively organised in Frysztat County of Silesian Voivodeship. The village was then annexed by Nazi Germany at the beginning of World War II. After the war it was restored to Czechoslovakia.

== See also ==
- Polish minority in the Czech Republic
- Zaolzie
