= Podbucze =

- Village
- Location within Poland
- Coordinates: 49°57′N 18°28′E
- Country: Poland
- Voivodeship: Silesian
- County: Wodzisław
- Gmina: Godów

Government
  - Mayor: Zyta Wrona
- Area: 0.59 km^{2} (0.23 sq mi)
- Population: 204
  - Density: 350/km^{2} (900/sq mi)
- Time zone: UTC+1 (CET)
  - Summer (DST): UTC+2 (CEST)
- Postal code: 44-348
- Car plates: SWD

Podbucze [pɔdˈbut͡ʂɛ] is a village in Gmina Godów, Wodzisław County, Silesian Voivodeship, southern Poland. It lies close to the border with the Czech Republic.
