= Godów, Silesian Voivodeship =

Godów
- Village
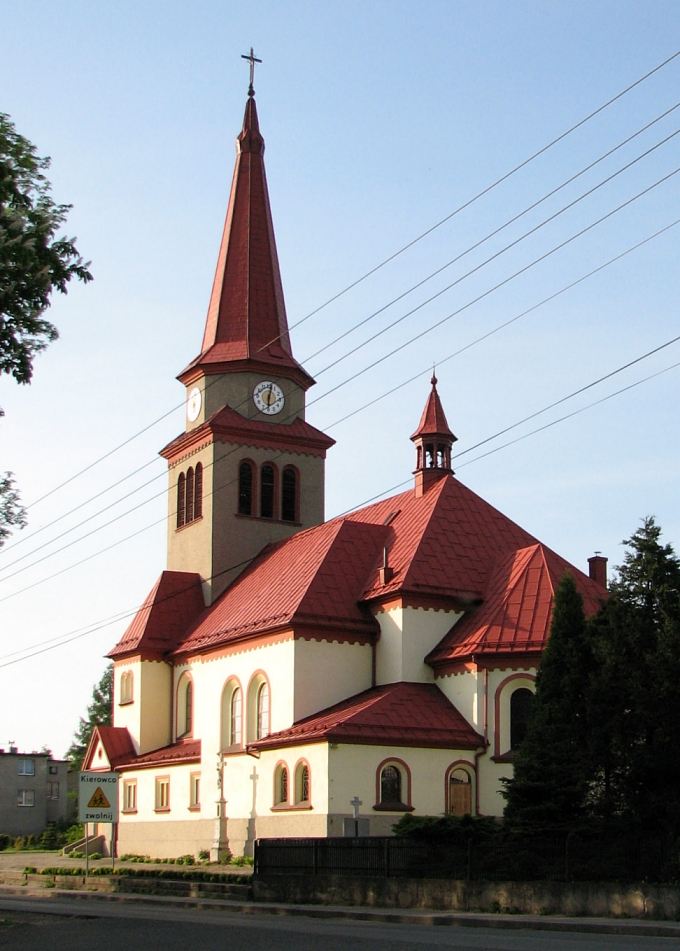
- Saint Joseph Church

- Flag Coat of arms

- Location within Poland
- Coordinates: 49°55′30″N 18°28′42″E
- Country: Poland
- Voivodeship: Silesian
- County: Wodzisław
- Gmina: Godów

Government
  - Mayor: Henryk Olejok
- Area: 11.56 km^{2} (4.46 sq mi)
- Population (2006): 3,280
  - Density: 284/km^{2} (735/sq mi)
- Time zone: UTC+1 (CET)
  - Summer (DST): UTC+2 (CEST)
- Postal code: 44-340
- Car plates: SWD
- Website: http://www.godow.pl

Godów [ˈɡɔduf] is a village and the seat of Gmina Godów, Wodzisław County, Silesian Voivodeship, southern Poland. It lies near the border with the Czech Republic. The Olza River (German: Olsa) flows through the village's southern outskirts.

Although it does not lie within the historical borders of Cieszyn Silesia, it is a part of the Euroregion Cieszyn Silesia.

During the First Silesian Uprising, on August 18, 1919, the town of Godów was the site of a battle which resulted in insurgent victory; following the uprising German soldiers executed 3 insurgents in the town on August 28.

Polish actor Franciszek Pieczka was born here.
