= Orlová monastery =

Coordinates: 49°50′46″N 18°25′48″E

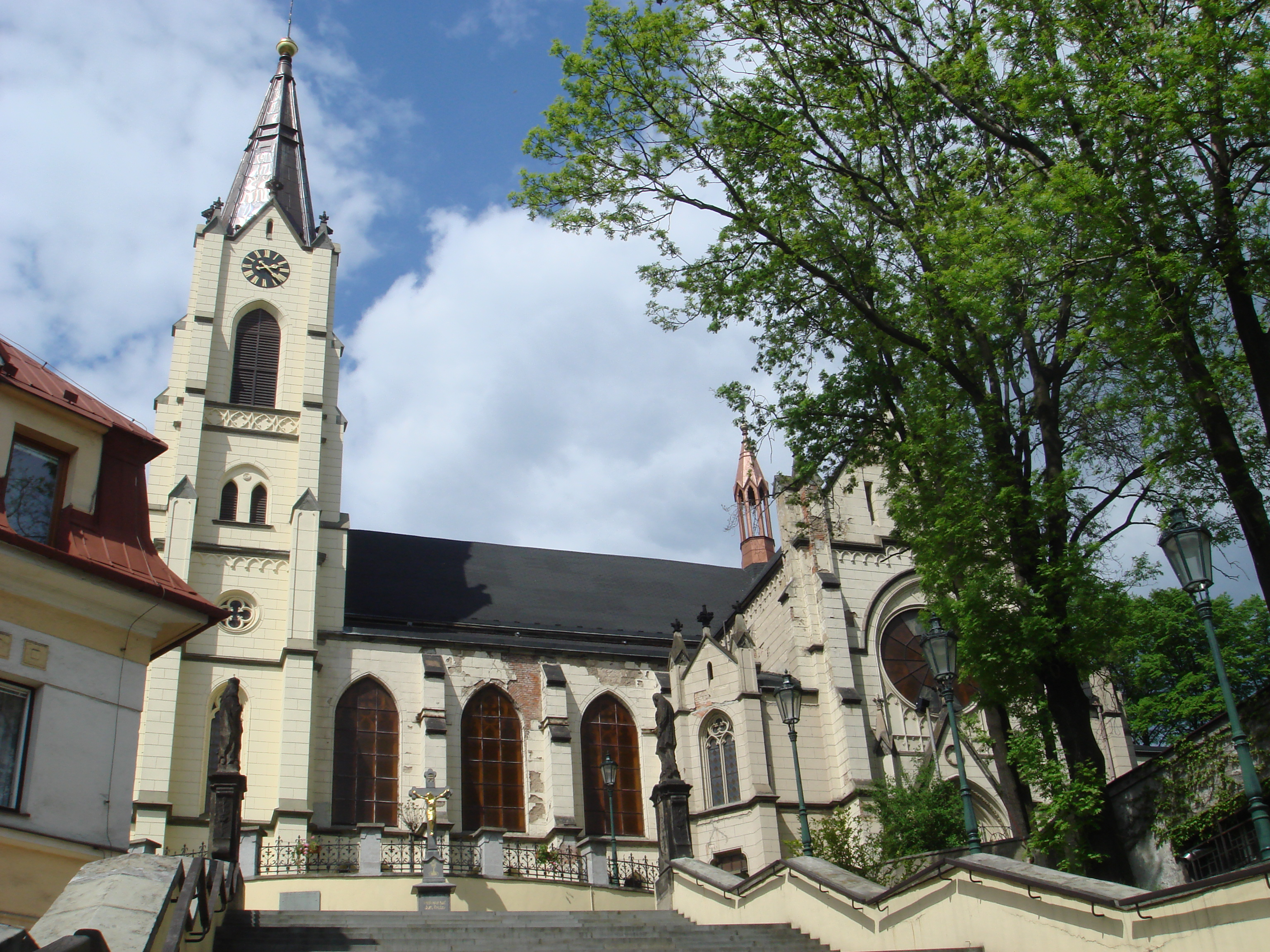
Birth of Virgin Mary Church in Orlová, built on the spot of the former monasteral church

The Orlová monastery (Czech: benediktinský klášter v Orlové, Polish: klasztor benedyktynów w Orłowej) was a Benedictine abbey established around 1268 in what is now a town of Orlová in the Karviná District, Moravian-Silesian Region, Czech Republic.

== History ==
Orlová was first mentioned in a written document in 1227 issued by Pope Gregory IX for the Benedictine abbey in Tyniec. Another his letter from 1229 listed surrounding villages as belonging to the Tyniec abbey: Těrlicko, Doubrava, Chotěbuz, Lacbanty (nowadays unknown), Orlová, Slezská Ostrava, Puńców, Vrbice, Záblatí, Žukov and a few others lying in castellany of Racibórz. Probably back then the monks had built a first chapel in Orlová.

Politically the area belonged then to the Duchy of Opole and Racibórz, close to the Ostravice river, which was in 1261 agreed by a special treaty to be a local border between Upper Silesia and Moravia. In order to strengthen it Władysław Opolski in 1268 decided to found an abbey in Orlová. It was intended to be a branch of the Tyniec abbey.

The new monastery was initially endowed with six villages: Orlová, Solca (with an inn), Doubrava, Chotěbuz, Vrbice (without an inn) and Záblatí. Additionally they could levy revenues from inns and tithe in Žukov, Těrlicko, Ostrava and Lacbanty, and in the late 13th century they also had rights to revenues from three villages in the Castellany of Racibórz: Gorzyce, Uchylsko and Gołkowice.

The Benedictines also created a few new associated villages like: Lazy, Poruba, Rychvald, Žermanice, and maybe also Horní Lutyně, Dolní Lutyně and Cula (Staré Město?).

As the first abbot served father Jan from Tyniec. He was accompanied by a few to no more than a score of brothers. They had started building a new church and a monastery. In the beginnings of 15th century they suffered through a financial crisis. To survive they sold a part of their belongings. In 1540s the Reformation began in the Duchy of Teschen. In 1545 Wacław III Adam secularised belongings of the abbey, which sparkled a conflict with Orlová's abbot, which ended in 1560 when the remaining belongings were also confiscated by the duke. The buildings of the monastery were demolished, apart from the church. The monks never managed to regain what they lost afterwards. In 1718 the abbey was subordinated to a Benedictine congregation in Broumov.
