= Gorzyce, Silesian Voivodeship =

Gorzyce
- Village
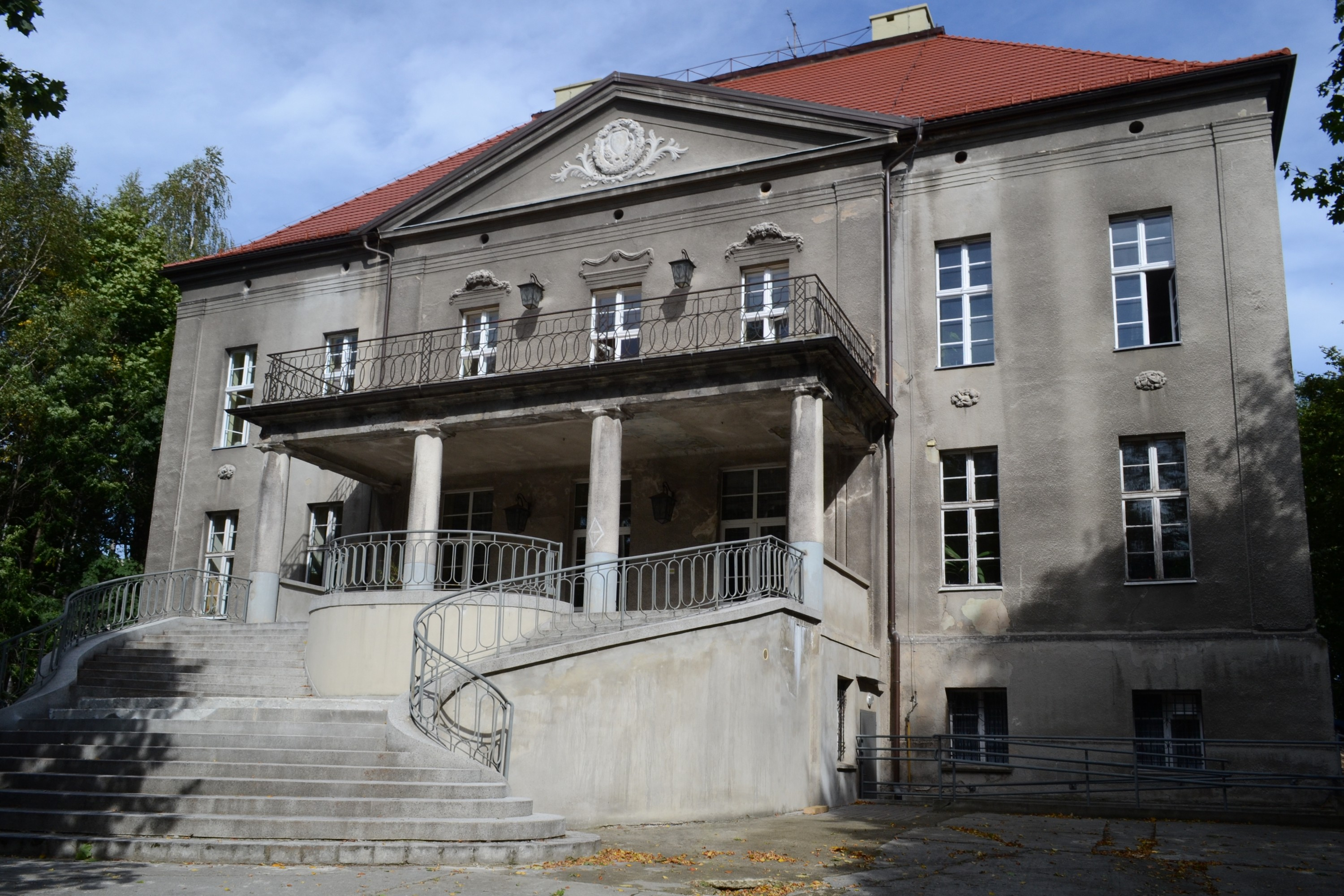
- Palace

- Coat of arms
- Motto: Palace
- Location within Poland
- Coordinates: 49°57′34″N 18°23′53″E
- Country: Poland
- Voivodeship: Silesian
- County: Wodzisław
- Gmina: Gorzyce
- First mentioned: 1229

Government
  - Mayor: Ryszard Grzegoszczyk

Area
  - Total: 8.46 km^{2} (3.27 sq mi)

Population
  - Total: 2,487
  - Density: 294/km^{2} (761/sq mi)
- Time zone: UTC+1 (CET)
  - Summer (DST): UTC+2 (CEST)
- Postal code: 44-350
- Car plates: SWD
- Website: http://www.gorzyce.pl/

Gorzyce [ɡɔˈʐɨt͡sɛ] is a village and the seat of Gmina Gorzyce in Wodzisław County, Silesian Voivodeship, Poland. It lies near the border with the Czech Republic, approximately 8 kilometres (5 mi) south-west of Wodzisław Śląski.

== History ==
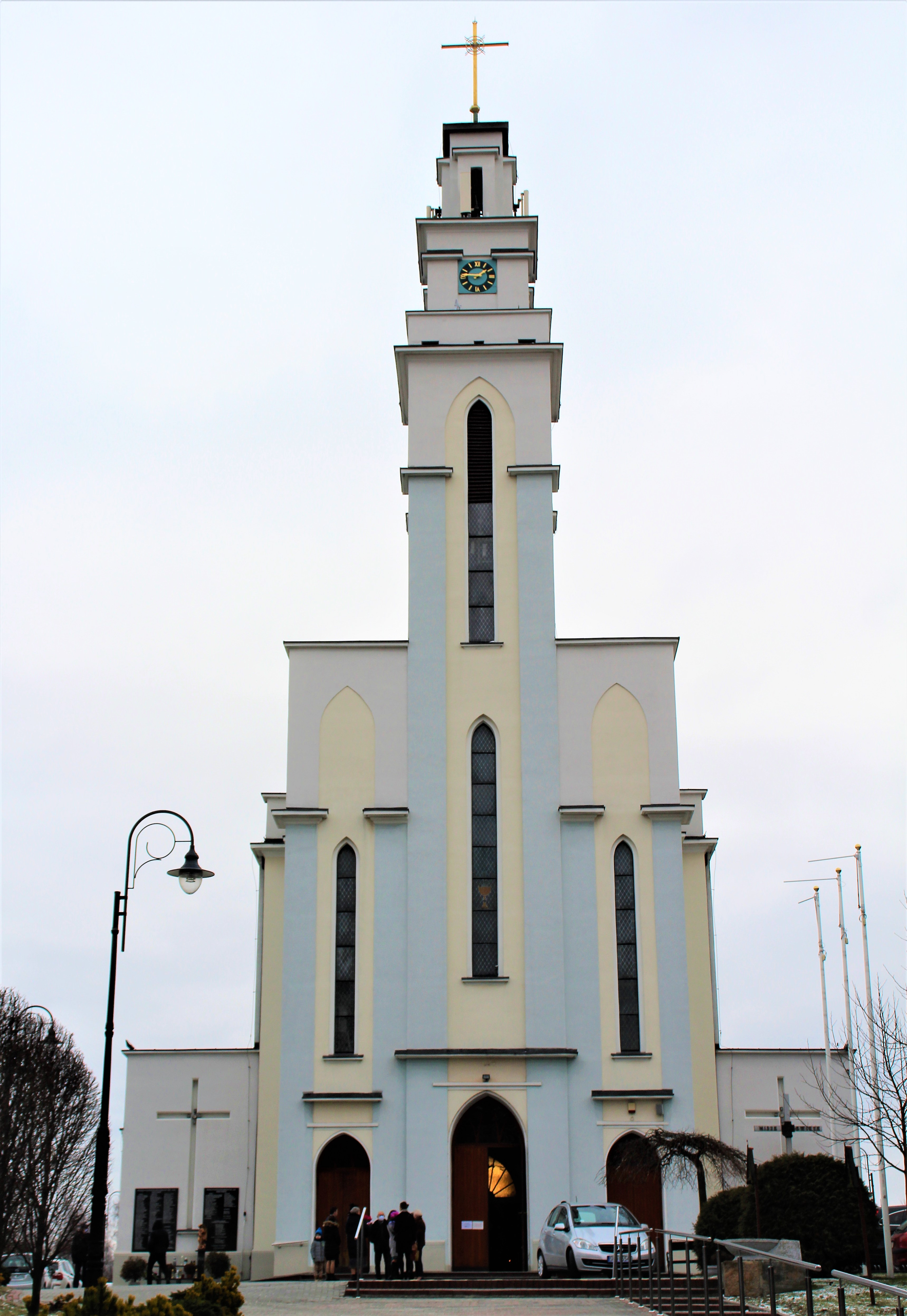
Guardian Angel Church

The area became part of the emerging Polish state in the 10th century. The village was first mentioned in the document of Pope Gregory IX issued on 26 May 1229 among villages belonging to Benedictine abbey in Tyniec, as maiori Gorzice. Benedictine abbey in Orlová (established in 1268) in the late 13th century had rights to revenues from three villages in the Castellany of Racibórz, namely Gorzyce, Uchylsko and Gołkowice.

The village was annexed by the Kingdom of Prussia in 1742 after the First Silesian War. As Groß Gorschütz, it became part of the German Empire in 1871 and was restored to Poland after World War I.

Following the joint German-Soviet invasion of Poland, which started World War II in September 1939, the village was occupied by Germany until 1945. In 1942, the occupiers established the Polenlager 168, a Nazi concentration camp of Polenlager type, i.e. for Poles, in Gorzyce. Among the prisoners were Poles expelled from the Bielsko, Chrzanów, Cieszyn and Zawiercie counties. The prisoners were subjected to forced labour and Germanisation attempts. In November 1943, the camp was dissolved with the prisoners deported to a Polenlager in Kietrz, and a camp for German colonists, who were settled in occupied Poland in accordance with the Lebensraum policy, was established in its place. The building of the transport depot at Leśna street holds a memorial plaque. The collective grave of the inmates is at the cemetery at Gorzyce.

== People ==
- Georg von Arco (1869–1940), German radio pioneer
