= Gmina Godów =

Gmina Godów Godów Commune
- Gmina
- Flag Coat of arms
- Interactive map of Gmina Godów
- Coordinates (Godów): 49°56′N 18°29′E
- Country: Poland
- Voivodeship: Silesian
- County: Wodzisław
- Seat: Godów

Government
  - Mayor: Mariusz Adam Adamczyk

Area
  - Total: 37.97 km^{2} (14.66 sq mi)

Population (2019-06-30)
  - Total: 13,758
  - Density: 362.3/km^{2} (938.5/sq mi)
- Website: https://www.godow.pl/

Gmina Godów is a rural gmina (administrative district) in Wodzisław County, Silesian Voivodeship, in southern Poland. Its seat is the village of Godów.

The gmina covers an area of 37.97 square kilometres (14.7 sq mi), and as of 2019, its total population was 13,758.

== Villages ==
The gmina contains the villages of Godów, Gołkowice, Krostoszowice, Łaziska, Podbucze, Skrbeńsko and Skrzyszów.

== Neighbouring gminas ==
Gmina Godów is bordered by the gminas of Gorzyce, Jastrzębie-Zdrój, Mszana and Wodzisław Śląski. It also borders the Czech Republic.

== Twin towns – sister cities ==
Gmina Godów is twinned with:

- Dolní Lutyně, Czech Republic
- Petrovice u Karviné, Czech Republic
- Stare Miasto, Poland
