= Kamień nad Odrą =

Coordinates: 49°58′53″N 18°18′27″E

- Village
- Interactive map of Kamień nad Odrą
- Country: Poland
- Voivodeship: Silesian
- County: Wodzisław
- Gmina: Gorzyce

Kamień nad Odrą (Polish pronunciation: [ˈkamjɛj̃ ˌnat ˈɔdrɔ̃]) is a former village in the administrative district of Gmina Gorzyce, within Wodzisław County, Silesian Voivodeship, in southern Poland, close to the Czech border.
