= Łaziska, Silesian Voivodeship =

Łaziska
- Village
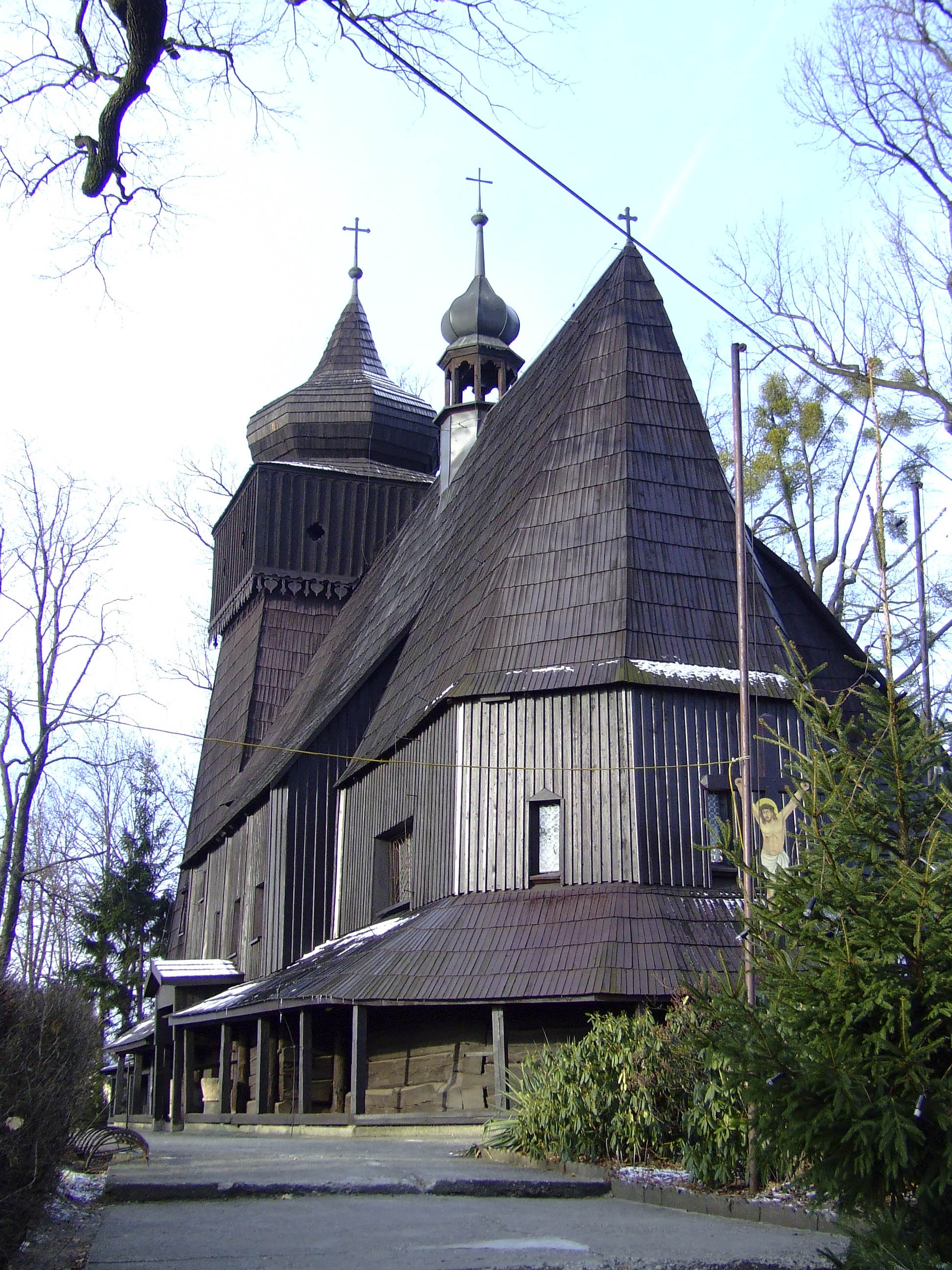
- All Saints Church

- Location within Poland
- Coordinates: 49°56′9.9″N 18°26′38.6″E
- Country: Poland
- Voivodeship: Silesian
- County: Wodzisław
- Gmina: Godów

Government
  - Mayor: Zdzisław Widenka
- Area: 7.75 km^{2} (2.99 sq mi)
- Population (2006): 1,715
  - Density: 221/km^{2} (573/sq mi)
- Time zone: UTC+1 (CET)
  - Summer (DST): UTC+2 (CEST)
- Postal code: 44-340
- Car plates: SWD

Łaziska [waˈʑiska] is a village in Gmina Godów, Wodzisław County, Silesian Voivodeship, southern Poland. It lies on the border with the Czech Republic.

There is a wooden All Saints Church from 1467 in the village.
