= Nový Hrádek =

- Market town
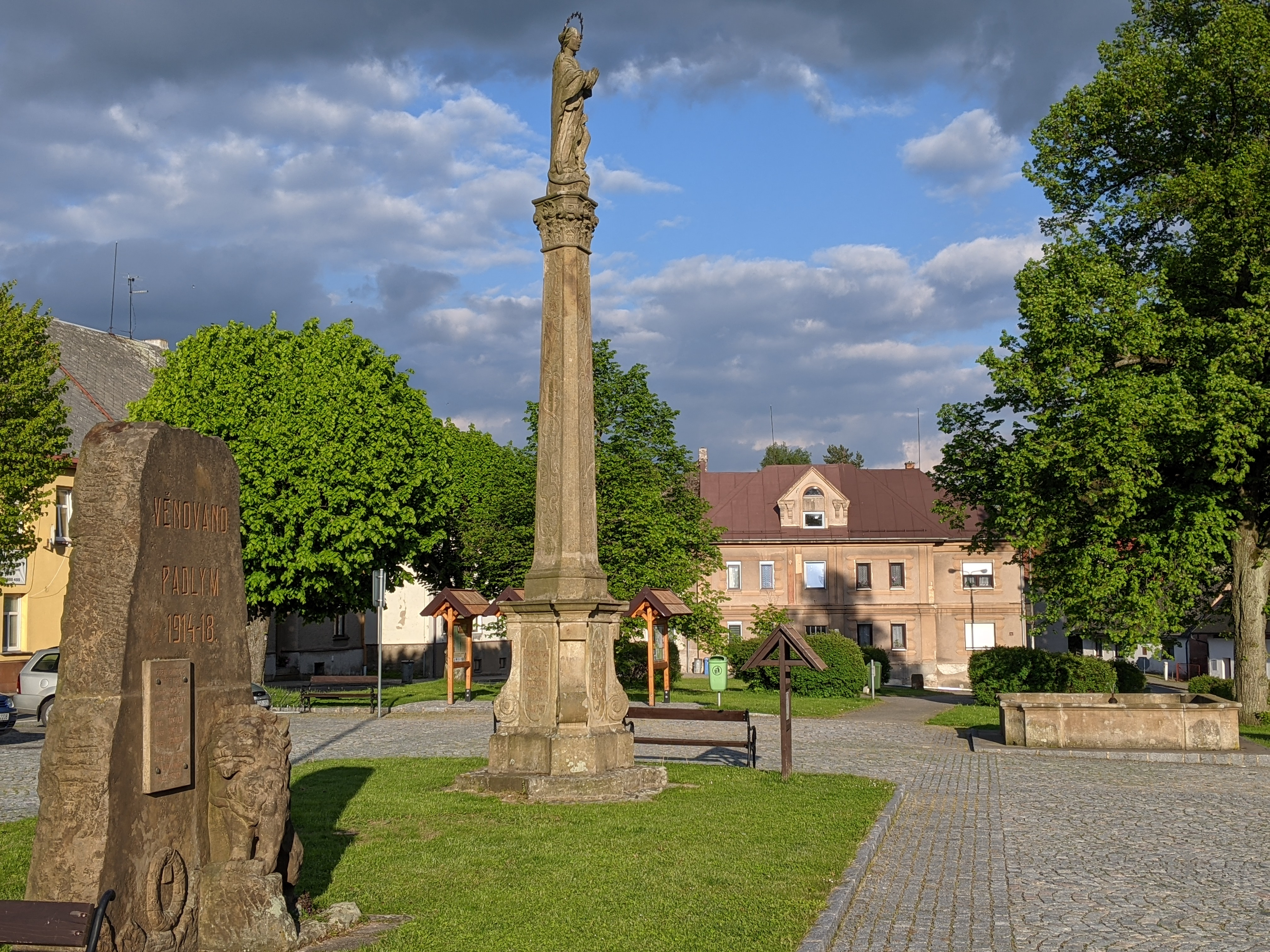
- Town square

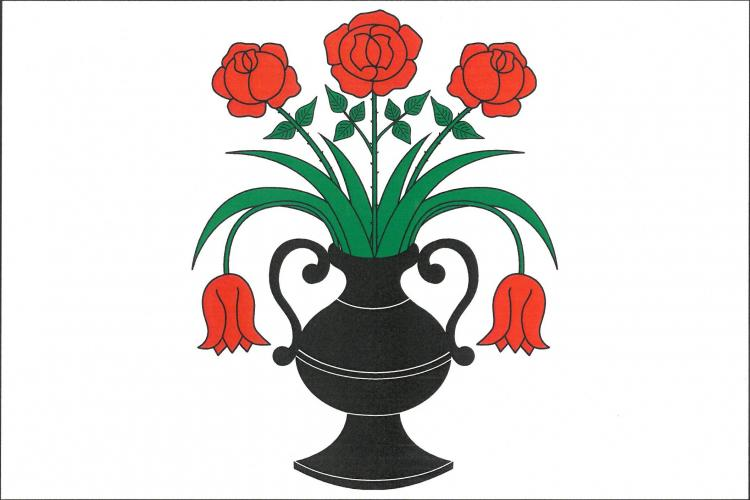
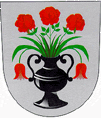
- Flag Coat of arms

- Location in the Czech Republic
- Coordinates: 50°21′26″N 16°14′40″E
- Country: Czech Republic
- Region: Hradec Králové
- District: Náchod
- First mentioned: 1362

Area
  - Total: 11.40 km^{2} (4.40 sq mi)
- Elevation: 560 m (1,840 ft)

Population (2026-01-01)
  - Total: 887
  - Density: 77.8/km^{2} (202/sq mi)
- Time zone: UTC+1 (CET)
  - Summer (DST): UTC+2 (CEST)
- Postal codes: 549 01, 549 22
- Website: www.novy-hradek.cz

Nový Hrádek (Czech pronunciation: [ˈnoviː ˈɦraːdɛk]; German: Neubürgles) is a market town in Náchod District in the Hradec Králové Region of the Czech Republic. It has about 900 inhabitants.

== Administrative division ==
Nový Hrádek consists of four municipal parts (in brackets population according to the 2021 census):

- Nový Hrádek (763)
- Dlouhé (15)
- Krahulčí (0)
- Rzy (18)

== Etymology ==
The name means 'new small castle' in Czech.

== Geography ==
Nový Hrádek is located about 8 kilometres (5 mi) southeast of Náchod and 32 km (20 mi) northeast of Hradec Králové, on the border with Poland. It lies in the Orlické Foothills. The highest point is a hill at 674 m (2,211 ft) above sea level. The Olešenka Stream flows through the municipal territory.

== History ==
The first written mention of Hrádek is from 1362. In 1736, Emperor Charles VI allowed Hrádek to hold markets. At this time, Hrádek was probably promoted to a market town and started to be called Nový Hrádek.

== Demographics ==
Historical population

Year	Pop.	±%
1869	2,112	—
1880	1,995	−5.5%
1890	1,902	−4.7%
1900	1,828	−3.9%
1910	1,724	−5.7%

Year	Pop.	±%
1921	1,563	−9.3%
1930	1,510	−3.4%
1950	1,101	−27.1%
1961	1,036	−5.9%
1970	852	−17.8%

Year	Pop.	±%
1980	799	−6.2%
1991	700	−12.4%
2001	704	+0.6%
2011	770	+9.4%
2021	796	+3.4%

Source: Censuses

== Transport ==
There are no railways or major roads passing through the municipal territory.

== Sights ==
The main landmark of Nový Hrádek is the Church of Saints Peter and Paul. It dates from the 18th century. The church was designed by Jan Santini Aichel.

The ruin of the Frymburk Castle is locate on a hill west of the market town. The castle dates from the 14th century; existence of the castle was first documented in 1354. The castle was burned down in peasant rebellions in 1626 and 1629, and then burned down by the Swedish army in 1638. In 1659, the ruin was demolished. The castle was then restored, used as a hunting lodge and maintained until the mid-18th century. At the turn of the 18th and 19th centuries, the roof was taken down and the castle was definitely abandoned.
