= Gołkowice, Silesian Voivodeship =

Gołkowice
- Village
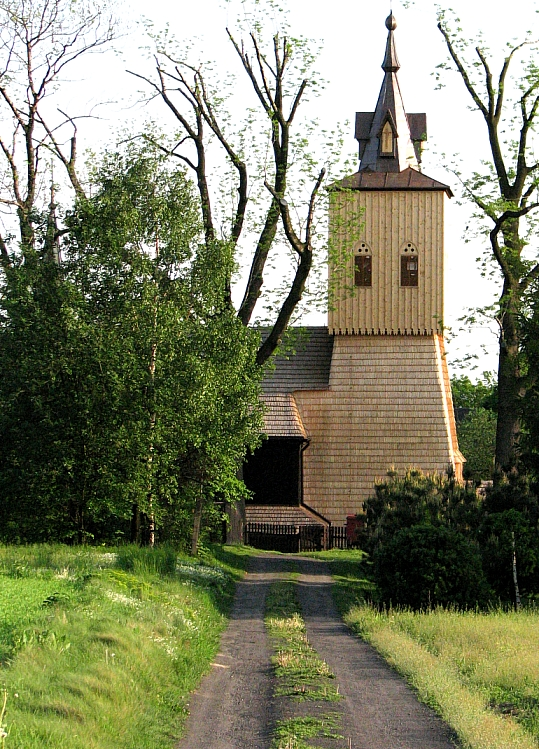
- Church of Saint Anne

- Location within Poland
- Coordinates: 49°54′44″N 18°30′11″E
- Country: Poland
- Voivodeship: Silesian
- County: Wodzisław
- Gmina: Godów
- First mentioned: 1229

Government
  - Mayor: Piotr Wrodarczyk

Area
  - Total: 9.46 km^{2} (3.65 sq mi)

Population (2006)
  - Total: 3,345
  - Density: 354/km^{2} (916/sq mi)
- Time zone: UTC+1 (CET)
  - Summer (DST): UTC+2 (CEST)
- Postal code: 44-341
- Car plates: SWD

Gołkowice [ɡɔu̯kɔˈvit͡sɛ] is a village in Gmina Godów, Wodzisław County, Silesian Voivodeship, southern Poland. It lies on the border with the Czech Republic.

The village was first mentioned in the document of Pope Gregory IX issued on 26 May 1229 among villages belonging to Benedictine abbey in Tyniec, as Golkowice. Benedictine abbey in Orlová (established in 1268) in the late 13th century had rights to revenues from three villages in the Castellany of Racibórz, namely Gorzyce, Uchylsko and Gołkowice.

There is a wooden Saint Anne Church from 1878 in the village.

== Notable people ==
- Marian Dziędziel, Polish actor
