= Gmina Gorzyce, Silesian Voivodeship =

Gmina Gorzyce Gorzyce Commune
- Gmina
- Coat of arms
- Interactive map of Gmina Gorzyce
- Coordinates (Gorzyce): 49°57′34″N 18°23′53″E
- Country: Poland
- Voivodeship: Silesian
- County: Wodzisław
- Seat: Gorzyce

Government
  - Mayor: Daniel Jakubczyk

Area
  - Total: 64.47 km^{2} (24.89 sq mi)

Population (2019-06-30)
  - Total: 21,285
  - Density: 330.2/km^{2} (855.1/sq mi)
- Website: http://www.gorzyce.pl

Gmina Gorzyce is a rural gmina (administrative district) in Wodzisław County, Silesian Voivodeship, in southern Poland, on the Czech border. Its seat is the village of Gorzyce, which lies approximately 6 kilometres (4 mi) south-west of Wodzisław Śląski and 54 km (34 mi) south-west of the regional capital Katowice. It is close to where the A1 motorway crosses the border into the Czech Republic to/from Poland

The gmina covers an area of 64.47 square kilometres (24.9 sq mi), and as of 2019, its total population was 21,285.

== Neighbouring gminas ==
Gmina Gorzyce is bordered by the town of Wodzisław Śląski and by the gminas of Godów, Krzyżanowice and Lubomia. It also borders the Czech Republic.

== Twin towns – sister cities ==
Gmina Gorzyce is twinned with:

- Bohumín, Czech Republic
- Dolní Lutyně, Czech Republic
- Kamianets-Podilskyi, Ukraine
- Stará Bystrica, Slovakia

== See also ==
- Kamień nad Odrą
