= Henryk Sławik and József Antall Monument (Warsaw) =

Sculpture in Warsaw, Poland

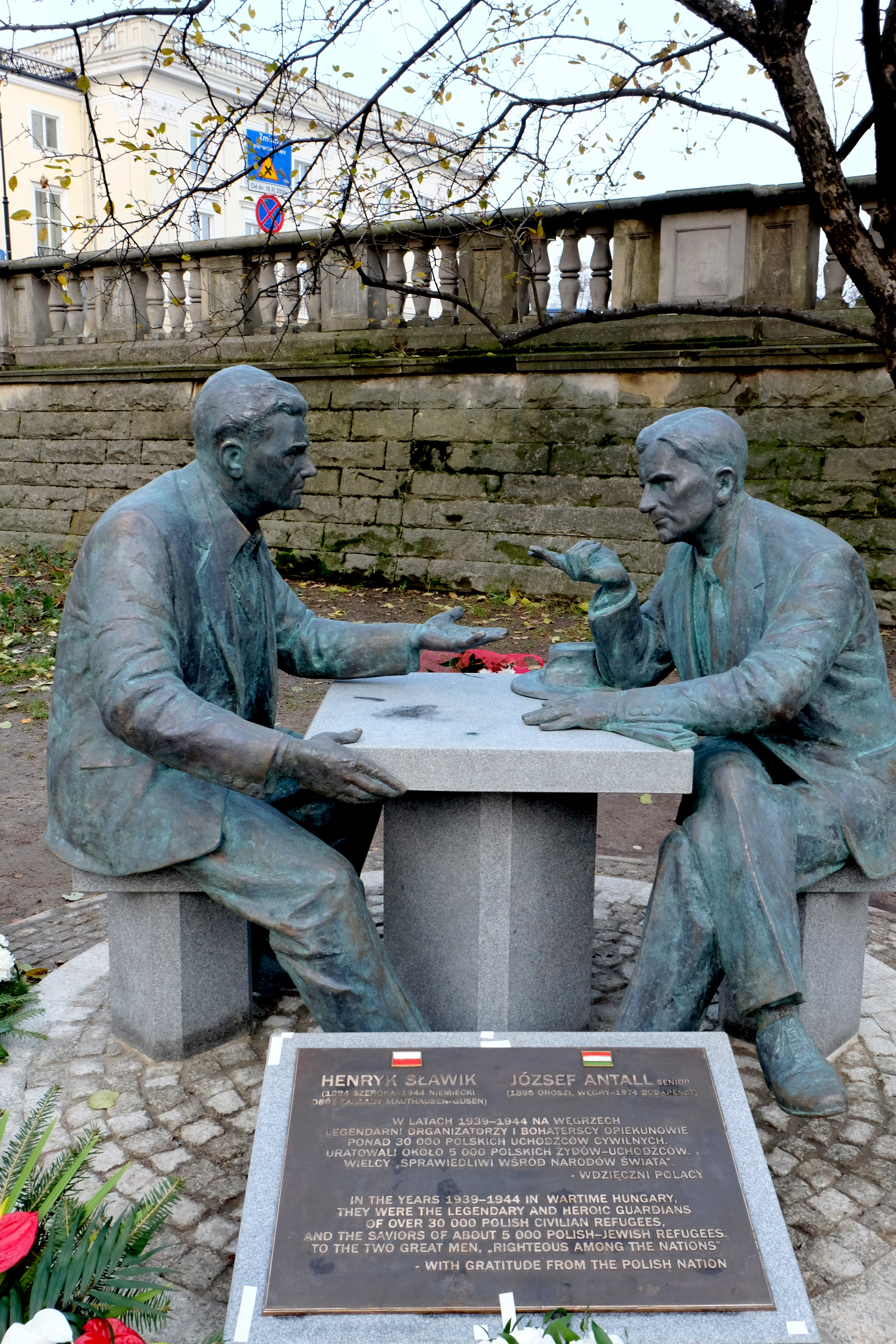
- The sculpture in 2016
- Interactive map of Henryk Sławik and József Antall Monument
- Location: Swiss Valley Park, Downtown, Warsaw, Poland
- Coordinates: 52°13′21.5″N 21°01′23.0″E
- Designer: Władysław Dudek
- Type: Statue
- Material: Bronze
- Opening date: 8 November 2016
- Dedicated to: Henryk Sławik; József Antall

The Henryk Sławik and József Antall Monument (Polish: Pomnik Henryka Sławika i Józsefa Antalla) is a memorial sculpture in Warsaw, Poland, within the South Downtown neighbourhood. Placed in the Swiss Valley Park, at the corner of Chopina and Sieroszewskiego Streets, it is dedicated to Polish and Hungarian politicians Henryk Sławik and József Antall, whom, during the Second World War, helped save over 30,000 Polish refugees, including 5,000 Polish Jews in Budapest, Hungary, by giving them false Polish passports with Catholic designation. They are depicted in form of two bronze statues sitting at a table while in the middle of a conversation. The monument was designed by Władysław Dudek and unveiled on 8 November 2016.

== History ==
The monument was proposed by Grzegorz Łubczyk, former ambassador of Poland to Hungary. It was designed by Władysław Dudek and unveiled on 8 November 2016 in Warsaw, Poland. The ceremony was attended by the Marshal of the Sejm Marek Kuchciński, Deputy Marshals of the Senate Maria Koc and Adam Bielan, Minister of Culture and National Heritage Piotr Gliński, ambassador of Hungary to Poland Iván Gyurcsík, archbishop of Warsaw Kazimierz Nycz, and chief rabbi of Poland Michael Schudrich.

On 26 June 2017, an identical sculpture was unveiled in Budapest, Hungary.

== Design ==
The sculpture consists of two bronze statues depicting Henryk Sławik and József Antall sitting at a table while in the middle of a conversation. It also features a plaque with the following inscription in Polish and English:

Henryk Sławik

(1894 Szeroka–1944 Niemiecki obóz zagłady Mauthausen-Gusen) [1894, Szeroka – 1944, Mauthausen-Gusen concentration camp]

Józef Antall Senior (1896 Oroszi, Węgry–1974 Budapeszt) [1896, Oroszi, Hungary – 1974, Budapest]

W latach 1939–1944 na Węgrzech legendarni organizatorzy i bohaterzy opiekunowie ponad 30 000 polskich uchdźców cywilnych. Uratowali około 5 000 polskich żydów-uchodźców. Wielcy „Sprawiedliwy wśród Narodów Świata”. —wdzięczni Polacy

In the years 1939–1944 in wartime Hungary, they were the legendary and heroic guardians of over 30 000 Polish civilian refugees, and saviours of about 5 000 Polish–Jewish refugees. To the two great men, "Righteous Among the Nations"

—with gratitude from the Polish Nation
