= Borynia =

Borynia refers to:

- Borynia, Turka Raion, town in Ukraine
- Borynia, Jastrzębie-Zdrój, village in Poland
