= Wybraniec =

Wybraniec is a Polish surname. Notable people with this surname include:

- Jindřich Wybraniec (born 1948), Czech sprint canoer
- Urszula Wybraniec-Skardowska (born 1940), Polish logician
