= Henryk Sławik and József Antall Monument (Budapest) =

Sculpture in Warsaw, Poland

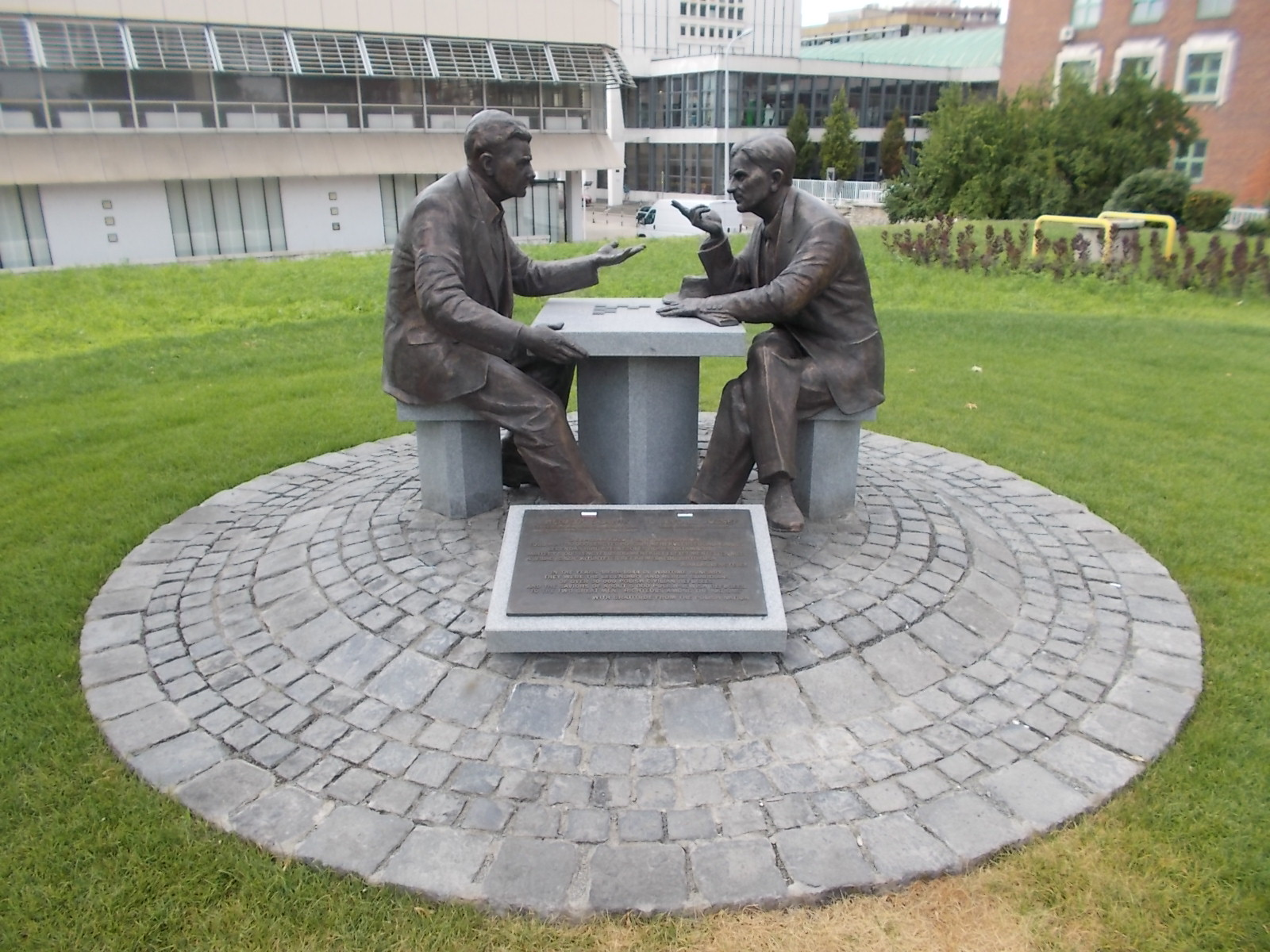
- The sculpture in 2017.
- Interactive map of Henryk Sławik and József Antall Monument
- Location: György Goldman Square, Újbuda, Budapest, Hungary
- Coordinates: 47.477634°N 19.059019°E
- Designer: Władysław Dudek
- Type: Statue
- Material: Bronze
- Opening date: 26 June 2017
- Dedicated to: Henryk Sławik; József Antall

The Henryk Sławik and József Antall Monument (Hungarian: Sławik Henryk és Antall József emlékműve; Polish: Pomnik Henryka Sławika i Józsefa Antalla) is a memorial sculpture in Budapest, Hungary, within the neighbourhood of Lágymányos in the district of Újbuda. Placed in the György Goldman Square, next to Józef Egry Street, it is dedicated to Polish and Hungarian politicians Henryk Sławik and József Antall, who, during the Second World War, helped save over 30,000 Polish refugees, including 5,000 Polish Jews in Budapest, by giving them false Polish passports with Catholic designation. They are depicted in form of two bronze statues sitting at a table while in the middle of a conversation. The monument was designed by Władysław Dudek and unveiled on 26 June 2017. A year prior, an identical sculpture was unveiled in Warsaw, Poland.

== History ==
The monument was unveiled 26 June 2017, by László Kövér, the Speaker of the National Assembly of Hungary, and Marek Kuchciński, the Marshal of the Sejm of Poland. The ceremony was attended was also attended by István Tarlós, the mayor of Budapest, as well as Jerzy Snopek and Grzegorz Łubczyk, then, respectively current and former ambassadors of Poland to Hungary. Many members of Polish diaspora were also present.

The monument is a copy of an identical sculpture by Władysław Dudek, which was unveiled in Warsaw, Poland on 8 November 2016. The project was proposed by Grzegorz Łubczyk.

== Design ==
The sculpture consists of two bronze statues depicting Henryk Sławik and József Antall sitting at a table while in the middle of a conversation.
