= Zvi Zimmerman =

Israeli politician, Zionist activist and jurist

- צבי הנריק צימרמן
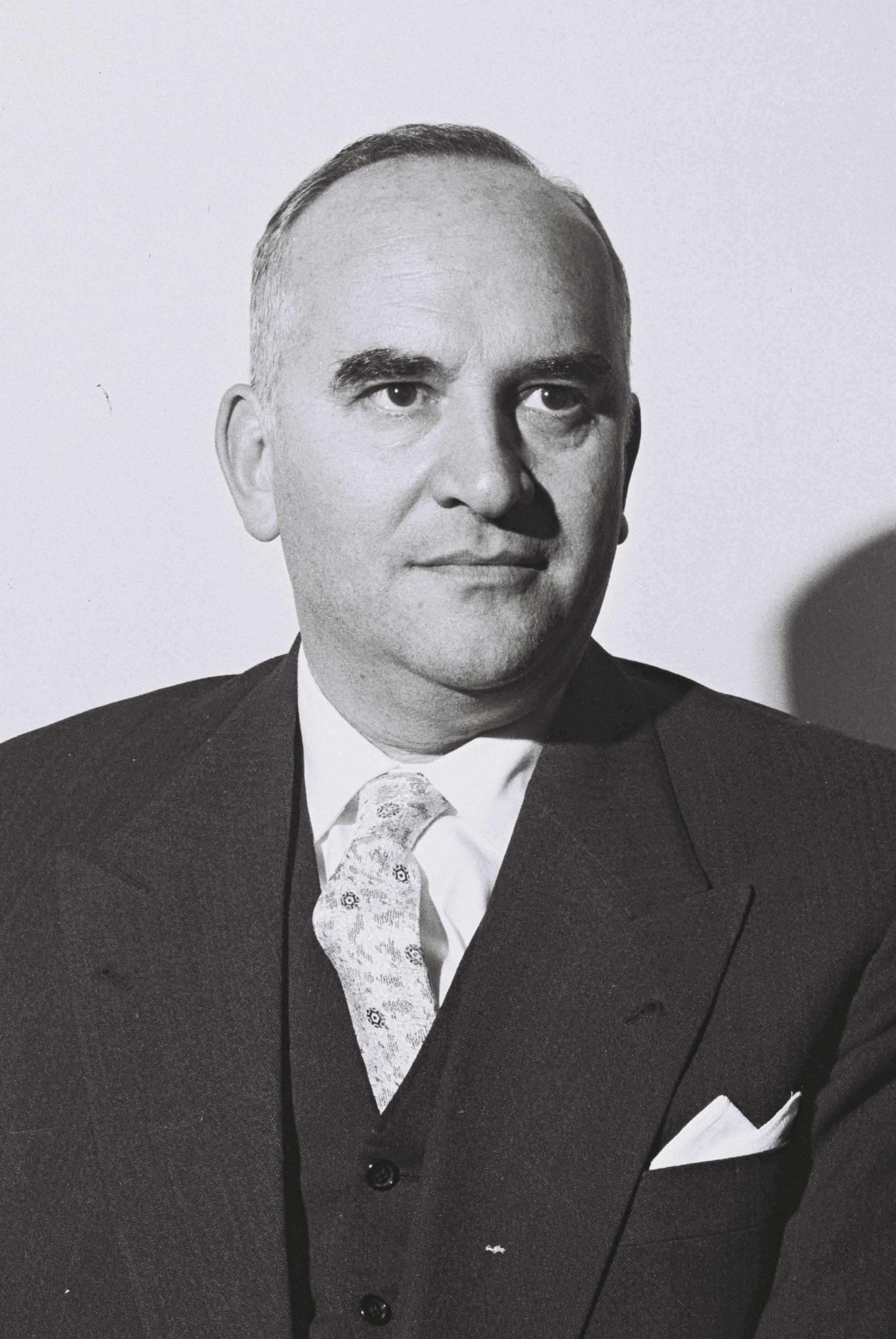
- Zimmerman in 1959

Faction represented in the Knesset
- 1959–1961: General Zionists
- 1961–1965: Liberal Party
- 1965–1974: Gahal

Personal details
- Born: 2 January 1913 Skala, Austria-Hungary
- Died: 10 June 2006 (aged 93)

Zvi Henryk Zimmerman (Hebrew: צבי הנריק צימרמן; born 2 January 1913, died 10 June 2006) was a Zionist activist, jurist, and Israeli politician. He is also known for his cooperation with Henryk Sławik to save Jews during the Holocaust.

== Biography ==
Zimmerman was born in 1913 in Skala-Podilska in Austria-Hungary (today in Ukraine), the son of Benjamin (Alter) Zimmerman and Zlata Pessia (Babe) Bitterman. He attended a secular high school and studied law at the Jagiellonian University. At the age of thirteen he became a devoted Zionist. He was a member of the Youth Movement of the General Zionists, Chairman of Kedima (the Zionist Student Union in Kraków) and Deputy Chairman of Kedima's national organization, and Deputy Chairman of the Zionist University Graduates.

He spent most of the war in the Kraków Ghetto. In the spring of 1943, after the ghetto was liquidated, he was taken to the Plaszow camp. After escaping from the Plaszów concentration camp and arriving in Budapest in October 1943, Zimmerman became the right-hand man to Henryk Sławik and the active chair of the Polish Civic Committee for Relief for Refugees. Their cooperation was supported by the Polish government-in-exile and Hungarian officials, including Dr. József Antall Sr. and Countess Szapáry. Zimmerman was entrusted with an official stamp, which he used to validate documents that allowed Polish Jews to assume Christian identities and obtain "Aryan" papers. Through these efforts, approximately 14,000 Jews were saved.

Earlier that year, in the spring of 1943, Sławik and Antall Sr. had initiated the establishment of an orphanage in Vác, Hungary, officially named the "Orphanage for Children of Polish Officers." The orphanage provided shelter to around 100 Jewish children, who were disguised as Christian orphans. After joining Sławik’s operations, Zimmerman helped manage and sustain the rescue activities, including support for the orphanage. At the institution, the children were taught Catholic prayers and attended church services to preserve their cover, while secretly continuing their Jewish education. This initiative became a crucial part of the broader rescue network operating in Hungary during the Holocaust.

After the war, Zimmerman dedicated himself to preserving the memory of the rescue efforts and advocating for recognition of his partners' heroism. Thanks in part to his initiatives, both Henryk Sławik and József Antall Sr. were later honored as Righteous Among the Nations by Yad Vashem. About 14,000 Jews were thus saved.

In 1944, he made Aliyah to the land of Israel. From 1951 to 1959 he was a member of the Haifa City Council. In 1959, he was elected to the Fourth Knesset for the General Zionists (which later merged into the Liberal Party), and was a member of the Internal Affairs and House Committees. He was re-elected to the next three Knessets for Gahal and served on the Labor-Welfare and Finance Committees. In the Seventh Knesset he was Deputy Speaker of the Knesset. In 1978, he ran for mayor of Haifa, placing third with 17.20% of the vote. From 1983 to 1986 he served as Israel's ambassador to New Zealand. In 1961 he testified as a witness in the trial of Adolf Eichmann.

After his term in Wellington ended, he returned to Israel. Following the fall of the Iron Curtain, he decided to visit Poland and Hungary in order to pay back his debt to Sławik and Antall. he found out that Sławik was tortured, and killed by the Nazis. Sławik never told the Germans about his cooperation with Antall, who died in 1974. He published an announcement on the Cracow Przekrój weekly and has thus contacted Sławik's daughter. Thanks to Zimmerman's efforts, Sławik was awarded the Righteous Among the Nations title by Yad Vashem in 1992.

Zimmerman died on 10 June 2006.

== Bibliography ==
- Zimmermann, Zvi (1994). Between the hammer of the Knesset and the anvil of the Party (in Hebrew). Tel-Aviv: HaMakhon LeHeker HaKalkalah VeHaHevrah BeYisrael Al-shem Yosef Sapir. ISBN 978-965-222-508-5.
- Zimmermann, Henryk Zvi (2004). I Have Survived, I Remember, I am a Witness. .: Kotarot. p. 278. ISBN 965-7238-14-5.
