= Łukasz Pielorz =

Polish footballer

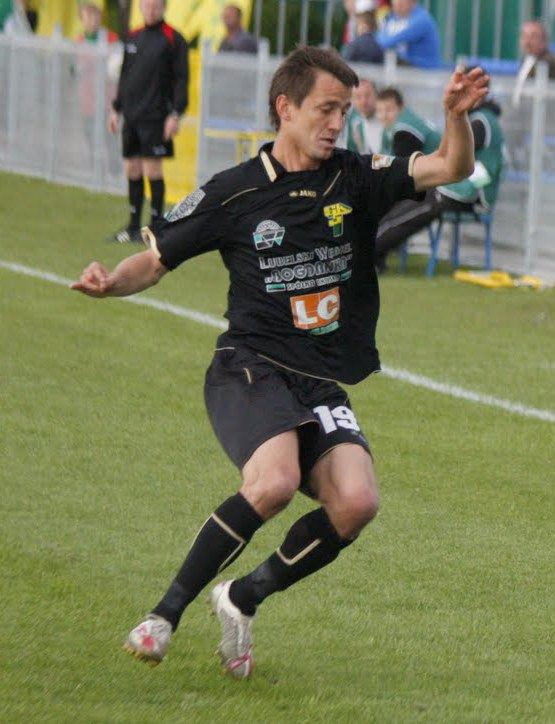

Personal information
- Full name: Łukasz Pielorz
- Date of birth: 23 May 1983 (age 43)
- Place of birth: Jastrzębie-Zdrój, Poland
- Height: 1.80 m (5 ft 11 in)
- Position: Defensive midfielder

Senior career*
| Years | Team | Apps | (Gls) |
| 2002–2005 | Górnik Jastrzębie Zdrój | | |
| 2005–2006 | GKS Jastrzębie | | |
| 2006–2007 | Giannena | 25 | (1) |
| 2007–2008 | GKS Jastrzębie | 38 | (0) |
| 2009–2010 | Odra Wodzisław | 25 | (0) |
| 2011 | Energetyk ROW Rybnik | 13 | (0) |
| 2011–2012 | Bogdanka Łęczna | 29 | (2) |
| 2012–2014 | Termalica Bruk-Bet | 51 | (2) |
| 2014–2017 | GKS Katowice | 83 | (1) |
| 2017–2018 | MFK Frýdek-Místek | 16 | (0) |
| 2018–2019 | SK Bischofshofen | 34 | (5) |
| 2019–2021 | SC Tamsweg | | |
- * Club domestic league appearances and goals

Łukasz Pielorz (born 23 May 1983) is a Polish former professional footballer who played as a defensive midfielder.

== Career ==
In July 2011, he joined Bogdanka Łęczna.

== Honours ==
Energetyk ROW Rybnik

- III liga Opole–Silesia: 2010–11
