= Szeroka =

Administrative unit in southern Poland

Coordinates: 49.989146°N 18.624489°E

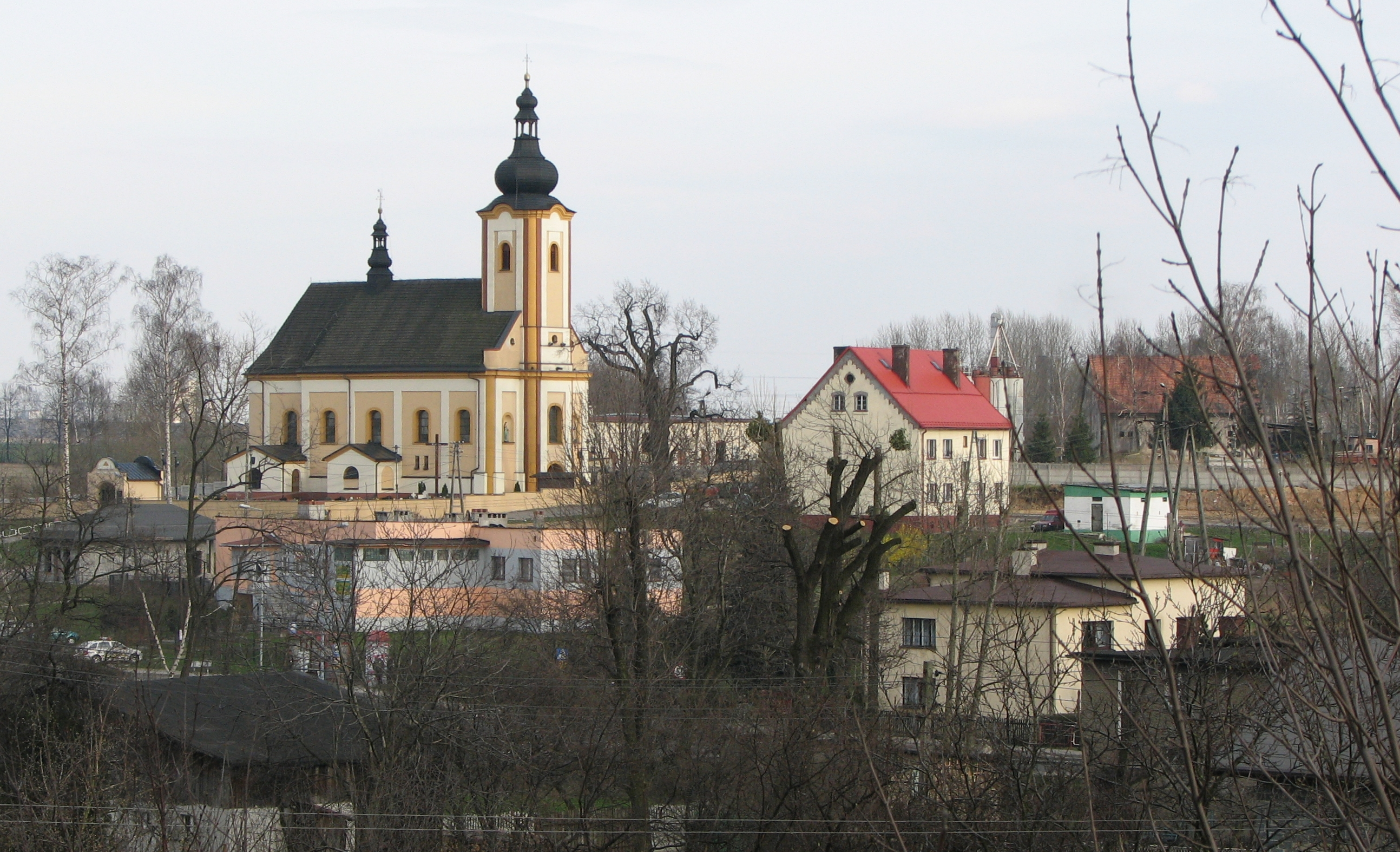
All Saints church from afar

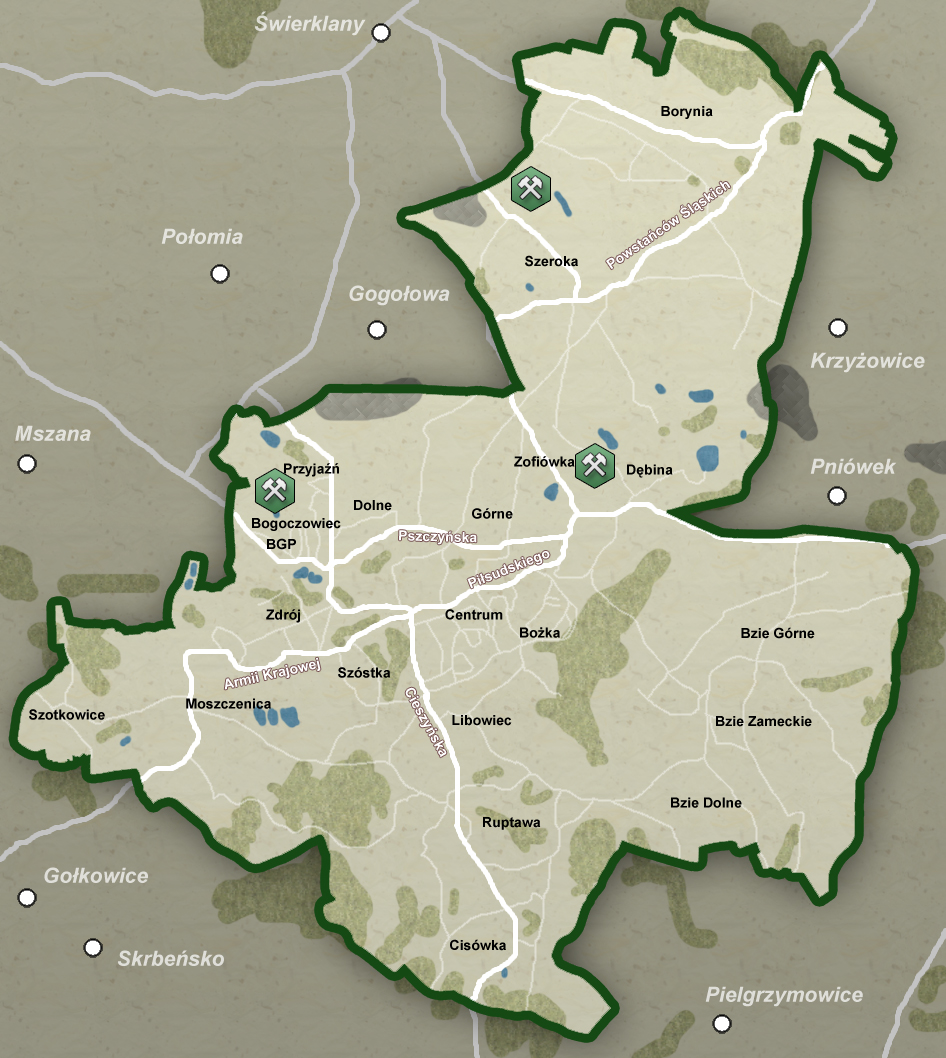
A map of Jastrzębie-Zdrój

Szeroka (German: Timmendorf) is a sołectwo of Jastrzębie-Zdrój, Silesian Voivodeship, southern Poland. It was an independent village but became administratively part of Jastrzębie-Zdrój in 1975. It has na area of 1026.64 ha and on December 31, 2012 it had 2,325 inhabitants.

== History ==
The village was first mentioned in a Latin document of Diocese of Wrocław called Liber fundationis episcopatus Vratislaviensis from around 1305 as item in Syroka et in Gogolow debent esse LIII) mansi. The creation of the village was a part of a larger settlement campaign taking place in the late 13th century on the territory of what would later be known as Upper Silesia. In 1321 appears the German name of the village, Tymendorf, which eventually evolved into Timmendorf.

A Catholic parish was established in the early years of the village. It was mentioned in the register of Peter's Pence payment from 1447 among the parishes of Żory Deanery as Tunsdorff.

Politically the village belonged initially to the Duchy of Racibórz, within feudally fragmented Poland. In 1327 the duchy became a fee of the Kingdom of Bohemia. During the political upheaval caused by Matthias Corvinus the land around Pszczyna was overtaken by Casimir II, Duke of Cieszyn, who sold it in 1517 to the Hungarian magnates of the Thurzó family, forming the Pless state country. In the accompanying sales document issued on 21 February 1517 the village was mentioned as Ssiroka. The Kingdom of Bohemia in 1526 became part of the Habsburg monarchy. In the War of the Austrian Succession most of Silesia was conquered by the kingdom of Prussia, including the village. After World War I in the Upper Silesia plebiscite 620 inhabitants voted in favour of joining Poland, against 22 for Germany. It became later a part of Silesian Voivodeship, Second Polish Republic. It was then annexed by Nazi Germany at the beginning of World War II. After the war it was restored to Poland.

A local Borynia Coal Mine, located actually in Szeroka but named after Borynia, was eventually opened in 1971, when Szeroka, Borynia and Skrzeczkowice formed one municipality with a seat in Borynia. In 1973 the seat was then moved to Szeroka.

In 1975, together with Borynia and Skrzeczkowice it was absorbed by Jastrzębie-Zdrój. In a local referendum held in 2000 the inhabitants of these three settlements voted in favour of remaining within the city.

== People ==
- Henryk Sławik, a Polish politician, was born here (in 1894)
