= Moszczenica, Jastrzębie-Zdrój =

Moszczenica
- Sołectwo of Jastrzębie-Zdrój
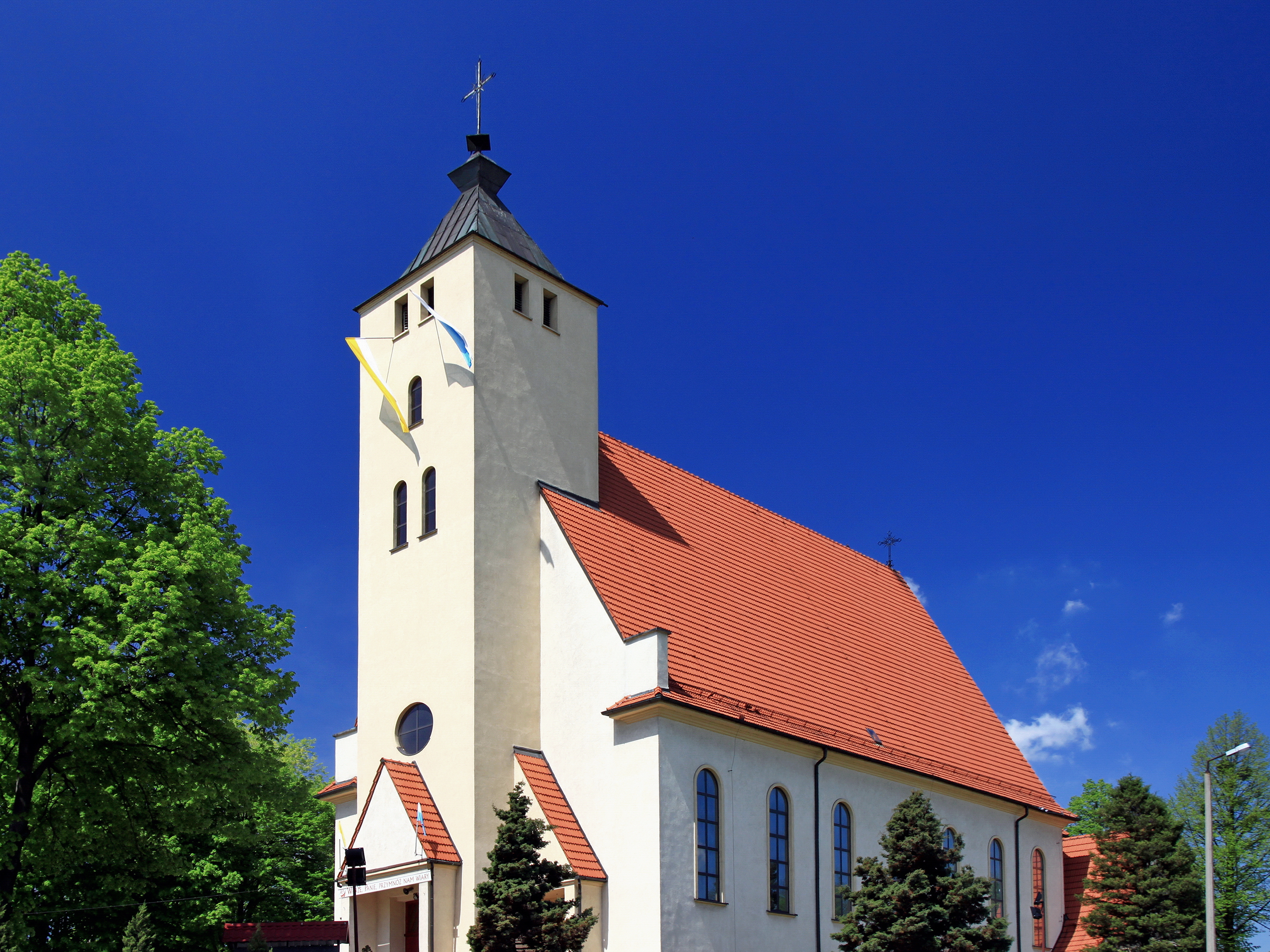
- Our Lady of the Rosary church

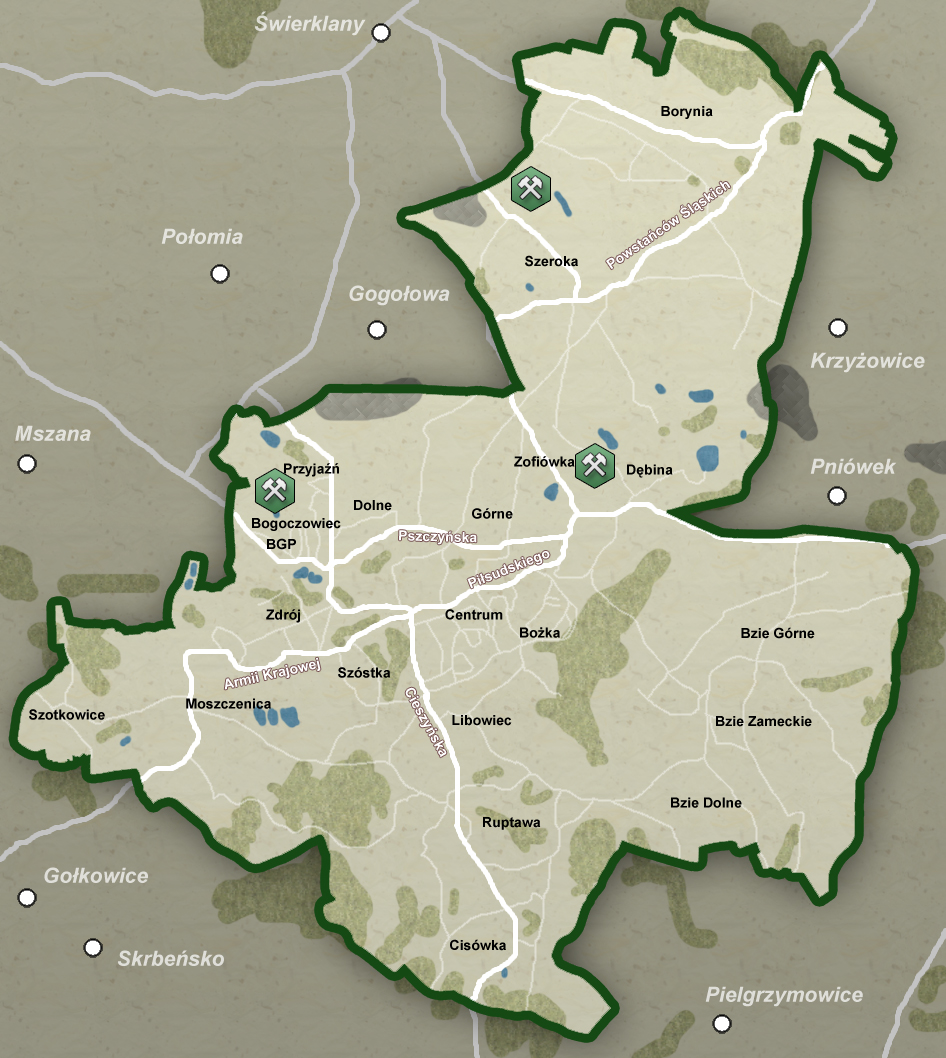
- Location of Moszczenica (south-west) within Jastrzębie-Zdrój
- Coordinates: 49.922716°N 18.601444°E
- Country: Poland
- Voivodeship: Silesian
- County/City: Jastrzębie-Zdrój

Area
  - Total: 8.03 km^{2} (3.10 sq mi)

Population (2012)
  - Total: 3,078
  - Density: 383/km^{2} (993/sq mi)
- Time zone: UTC+1 (CET)
  - Summer (DST): UTC+2 (CEST)
- Area code: (+48) 032

Moszczenica (German: Moschczenitz) is a sołectwo in the south west of Jastrzębie-Zdrój, Silesian Voivodeship, southern Poland. It was an independent village but became administratively part of Jastrzębie-Zdrój in 1975. It has na area of 803 ha and on December 31, 2012 it had 3,078 inhabitants.

== History ==
The village was first mentioned in a Latin document of Diocese of Wrocław called Liber fundationis episcopatus Vratislaviensis from around 1305 as item in Moschenicza debent esse XXIII) mansi. The creation of the village was a part of a larger settlement campaign taking place in the late 13th century on the territory of what would later be known as Upper Silesia. A Catholic parish was also established in the process. Politically the village belonged then to the Duchy of Racibórz, within feudally fragmented Poland. In 1327 the duchy became a fee of the Kingdom of Bohemia. From the 16th to the 19th century the village belonged to the Wodzisław state country. After the Silesian Wars it became a part of the Kingdom of Prussia. In years 1954-1975 Moszczenica was part of the Wodzisław County.
