= Ruptawa =

Polanski village

Coordinates: 49.922716°N 18.601444°E

- Sołectwo
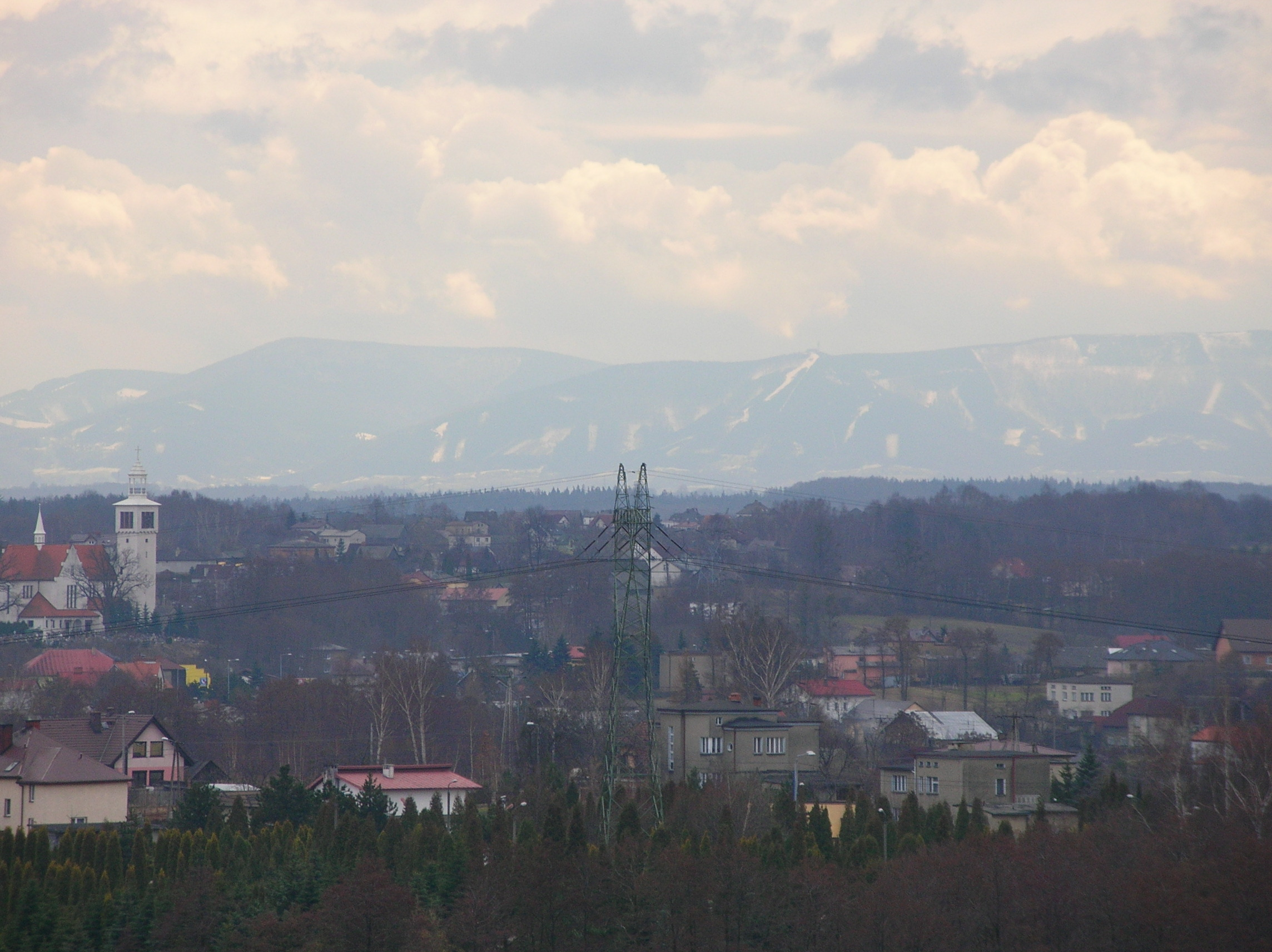
- Interactive map of Ruptawa
- Country: Poland
- Voivodeship: Silesian
- City-county: Jastrzębie-Zdrój
- Incorporated: 1975

Area
  - Total: 152,251 ha (376,220 acres)

Population (2012)
  - Total: 3,741
  - Density: 2.457/km^{2} (6.364/sq mi)

Ruptawa (German: Ruptau) is a sołectwo in the south of Jastrzębie-Zdrój, Silesian Voivodeship, southern Poland. It was an independent village but became administratively part of Jastrzębie-Zdrój in 1975.

It has an area of 1522,51 ha, and on December 31, 2012 it had 3,741 inhabitants.

== History ==
The village was first mentioned in the Latin manuscript of the Diocese of Wrocław, Liber fundationis episcopatus Vratislaviensis, from around 1305 as item in Ruptava debent esse triginta mansi. The creation of the village was a part of a larger settlement campaign taking place in the late 13th century on the territory of what would later be known as Upper Silesia. A Catholic parish was also established in the process. Politically the village belonged then to the Duchy of Racibórz, within feudally fragmented Poland. In 1327 the duchy became a fee of the Kingdom of Bohemia, which after 1526 became part of the Habsburg monarchy. From the 16th to the 19th century the village belonged to the Wodzisław state country. After Silesian Wars it became a part of the Kingdom of Prussia. In 1908 the village became a seat of a Lutheran parish.

In the interwar period it was one of only several municipalities in the Upper Silesian (thus excluding Cieszyn Silesia) part of autonomous Silesian Voivodeship which had over 10% of the Protestant population (29.7% in 1933). It was later annexed by Nazi Germany at the beginning of World War II, and returned to Poland afterwards. In 1954-1975 Ruptawa was part of Wodzisław County.

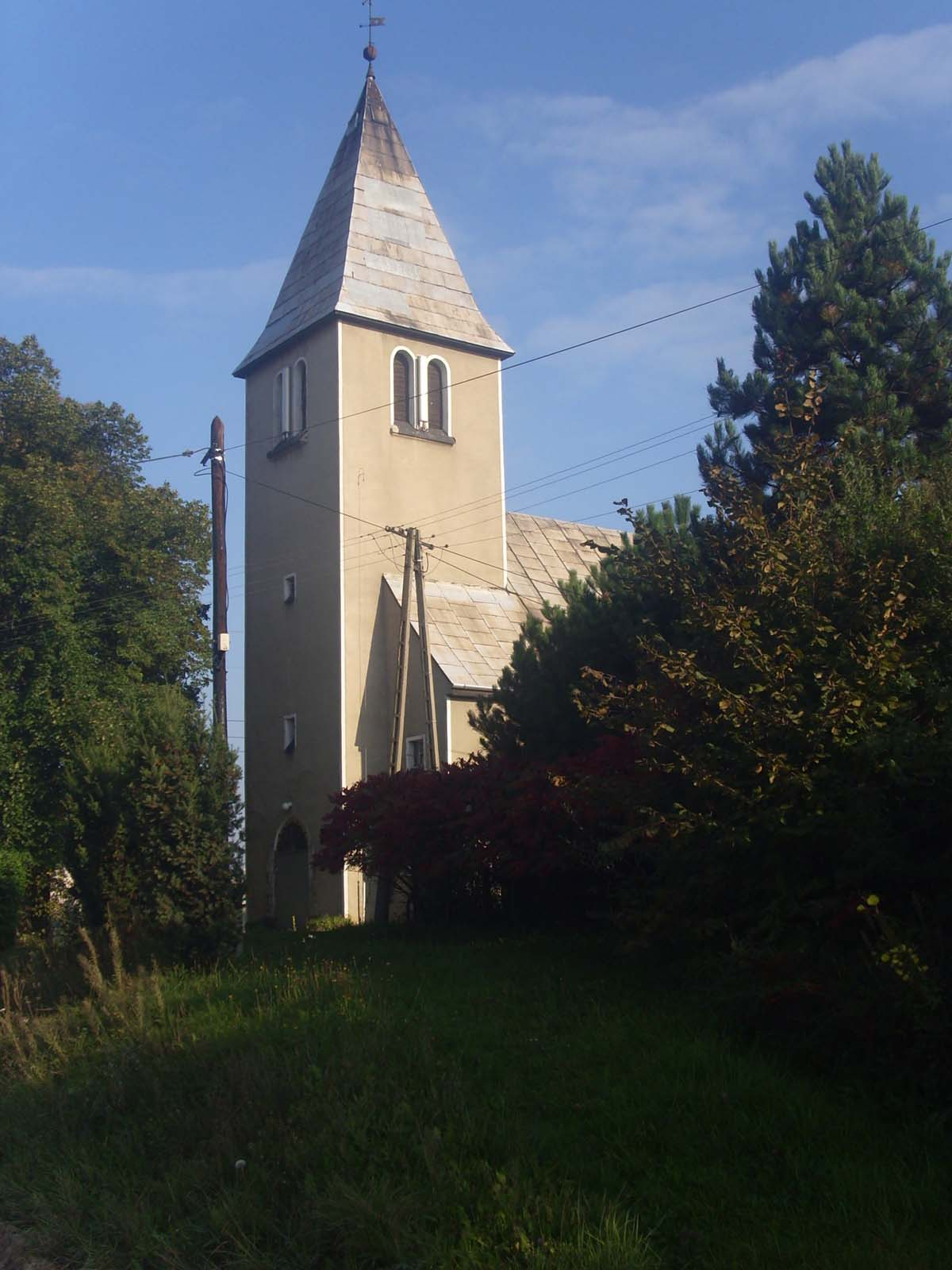
Old Lutheran church

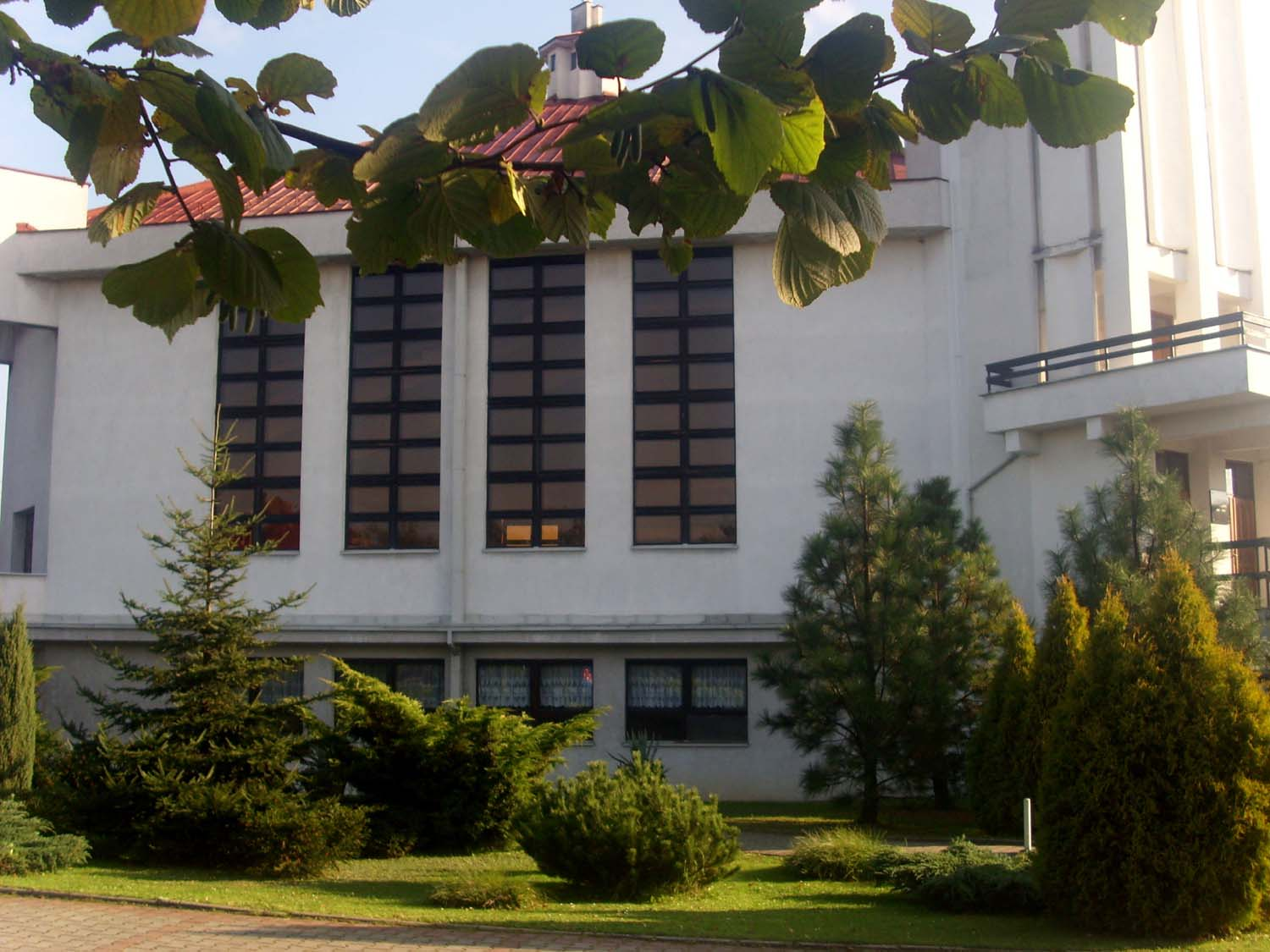
New Lutheran church
