= Borynia, Jastrzębie-Zdrój =

Borynia
- Jastrzębie-Zdrój
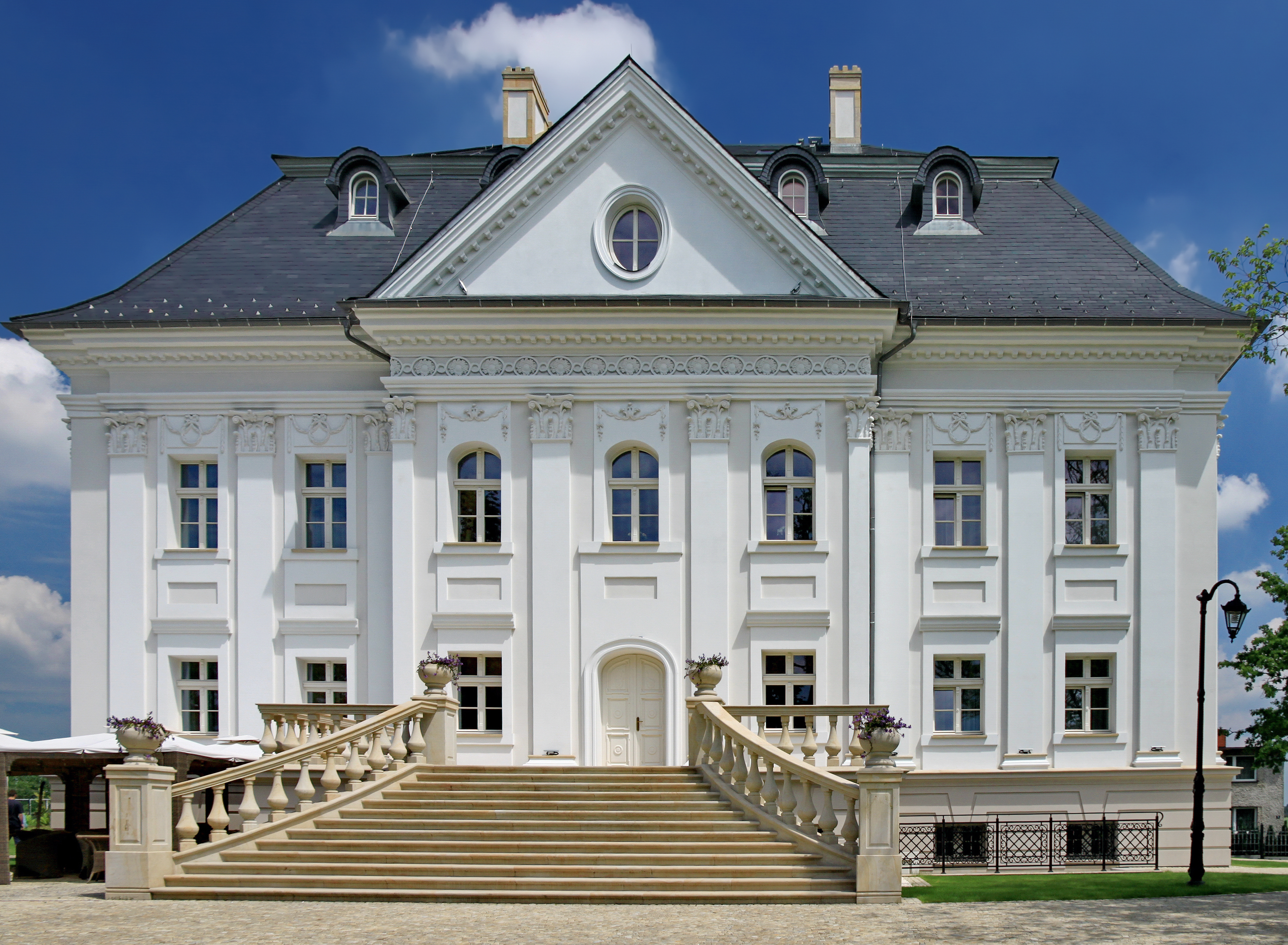
- Palace in Borynia

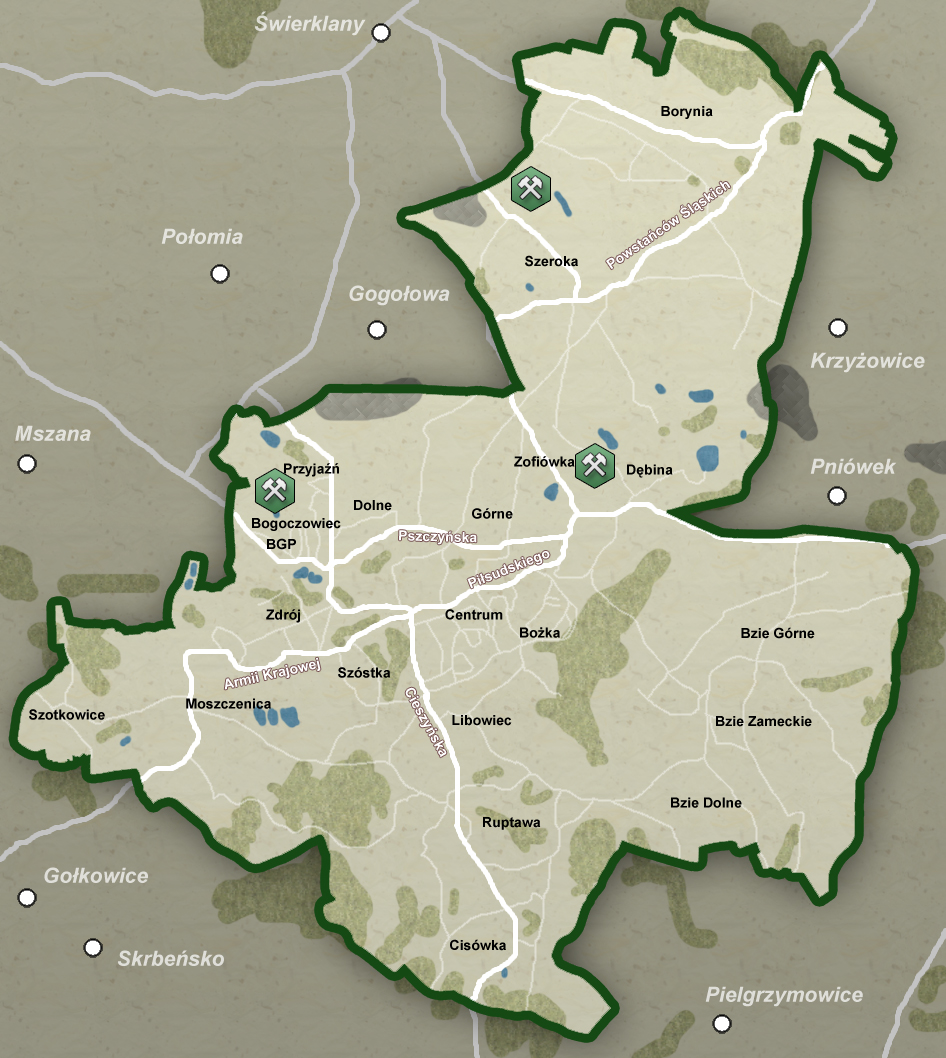
- Location of Borynia (north) within Jastrzębie-Zdrój
- Coordinates: 50°00′18″N 18°38′48″E
- Country: Poland
- Voivodeship: Silesian
- County/City: Jastrzębie-Zdrój

Area
  - Total: 8.2292 km^{2} (3.1773 sq mi)

Population (2012)
  - Total: 1,909
  - Density: 232.0/km^{2} (600.8/sq mi)
- Time zone: UTC+1 (CET)
  - Summer (DST): UTC+2 (CEST)
- Area code: (+48) 032

Borynia (German: Borin) is a sołectwo in the northern part of Jastrzębie-Zdrój, Silesian Voivodeship, southern Poland. It was an independent village but became administratively part of Jastrzębie-Zdrój in 1975. It has na area of 822.92 ha and on December 31, 2012, it had 1,909 inhabitants.

The origin of the name has three possible explanations. The first is that it is derived from the word bór (Polish: a conifer forest). The second connects it with the word bor, in Old Polish denoting fighting. The third theory explains the name as derived from the personal name Borysław.

== History ==
The village was first mentioned in a Latin document of Diocese of Wrocław called Liber fundationis episcopatus Vratislaviensis from around 1305 as item in Borina debent esse triginta novem mansi.

Politically the village belonged then to the Duchy of Racibórz, within feudally fragmented Poland. In 1327 the duchy became a fee of the Kingdom of Bohemia, which after 1526 became part of the Habsburg monarchy. After Silesian Wars it became a part of the Kingdom of Prussia.

In 1354 Nicholas II, Duke of Opava bestowed the village on a nobleman Stefan from Raszczyce. In the accompanying document the village had a second German name, Woigtsdorf (see Voigt, Polish: wójt), which later disappeared. The descendants of Stefan from Raszczyce borrowed later their surname from the village, Boryńscy. Parts of the village were in the following centuries in numerous possessions. In years 1572-1593 the village had five concurrent owners. This led to a development of many distinct parts and hamlets of the village, like Borynia Dolna (lower), Borynia Średnia (middle), Borynia Górna (upper). A local palace, which survived to modern times, was built by one of Schlutterbach family, who owned the village in the 18th century. The village was few times devastated by wars, especially in the 17th century, when in 1679 only one survivor was reported to live in the village.

In the 1770s to 1790s in the course of the Frederician colonization a colony (a settlement) called Rudolfsort was established on the fields of Borynia Dolna. It is not certain after whom was the colony named. The first settlers had mostly Polish-sounding names (Wiśniowski, Niemiec, Waliczek, Wiaterek, Pośpiechowa etc.). The colony formed an independent municipality until 1894, when it was absorbed back by Borynia. Another small colony was founded after parcellation of land in 1905. In that time the village was already largely affected by on-going industrial development in the vicinity and many of inhabitants worked in nearby coal mines. There were plans to open a local coal mine before World War II, but Borynia Coal Mine, located actually in Szeroka but named after Borynia, was eventually opened in 1971, when Szeroka, Borynia and Skrzeczkowice formed one municipality with a seat in Borynia.

After World War I in the Upper Silesia plebiscite 622 out of 644 inhabitants of Borynia voted in favour of joining Poland, against 22 for Germany. It became later a part of Silesian Voivodeship, Second Polish Republic. It was then annexed by Nazi Germany at the beginning of World War II. After the war it was restored to Poland. In 1954 it became a seat of a municipality where two other villages belonged: Szeroka and Skrzeczkowice. In 1973 the seat of the municipality, hence known as gmina, was moved to Szeroka. It was, however, in 1975 absorbed by Jastrzębie-Zdrój. In a local referendum held in 2000 the inhabitants of Borynia, Szeroka and Skrzeczkowice voted in favour of remaining within the city.

== See also ==
- Borynia Coal Mine
