= Dariusz Kłus =

Polish footballer (born 1981)

Personal information
- Full name: Dariusz Kłus
- Date of birth: 11 October 1981 (age 45)
- Place of birth: Jastrzębie-Zdrój, Poland
- Height: 1.87 m (6 ft 2 in)
- Position: Midfielder

Team information
- Current team: Decor Bełk (manager)

Senior career*
Years	Team	Apps	(Gls)
1998–1999	GKS Jastrzębie		
2000–2003	Odra Wodzisław	26	(1)
2004–2006	ŁKS Łódź	83	(7)
2007–2009	Cracovia	75	(3)
2010	Zagłębie Sosnowiec	14	(3)
2010–2012	ŁKS Łódź	39	(5)
2012–2017	Olimpia Grudziądz	128	(4)
2018	LKS 99 Pruchna	2	(0)
2021	Pniówek Pawłowice	0	(0)

Managerial career
- 2018–2021: Pniówek Pawłowice (assistant)
- 2021: GKS Jastrzębie (assistant)
- 2022: Kuźnia Ustroń
- 2022: Odra Wodzisław (assistant)
- 2022–2023: Spójnia Landek
- 2023–2024: Unia Turza Śląska
- 2025–: Decor Bełk
- * Club domestic league appearances and goals

Dariusz Kłus (born 11 October 1981) is a Polish professional football manager and former player who currently manages IV liga Silesia club Decor Bełk.

== Career ==
In February 2010, Kłus moved to Zagłębie Sosnowiec on a half-year deal.

In June 2010, Kłus joined ŁKS Łódź on a one-year contract.

== Managerial statistics ==
As of match played 15 November 2025

Managerial record by team and tenure
Team	From	To	Record							
Team	From	To	G	W	D	L	GF	GA	GD	Win %
Kuźnia Ustroń	1 April 2022	30 June 2022	12	9	2	1	28	8	+20	75.00
Spójnia Landek	1 November 2022	30 June 2023	19	9	2	8	29	24	+5	47.37
Unia Turza Śląska	18 December 2023	2 September 2024	26	10	9	7	43	32	+11	38.46
Decor Bełk	3 October 2023	Present	9	7	1	1	33	12	+21	77.78
Total			66	35	14	17	133	76	+57	53.03

== Honours ==
=== Player ===
ŁKS Łódź

- I liga: 2010–11

=== Manager ===
Spójnia Landek

- Polish Cup (Bielsko-Biała regionals): 2022–23

Unia Turza Śląska

- Polish Cup (Racibórz regionals): 2023–24
