= Skrzeczkowice =

District of Jastrzębie-Zdrój

Coordinates: 50.017057°N 18.625172°E

- Sołectwo
- Interactive map of Skrzeczkowice

Area
  - Total: 24,884 ha (61,490 acres)

Population (2012)
  - Total: 728
  - Density: 2.93/km^{2} (7.58/sq mi)

Skrzeczkowice (German: Eichendorf) is a sołectwo in the northern part Jastrzębie-Zdrój, Silesian Voivodeship, southern Poland. It was an independent village but became administratively part of Jastrzębie-Zdrój in 1975. It has na area of 248,84 ha (historically it was 326 ha) and on December 31, 2012, it had 728 inhabitants.

The name of the village is possessive in origin derived from personal name Skrzek. Since the 14th century the name has been transcribed as Skrzetzkowitz, Skrzeczkowicz, Skreczkowitz. The German name Eichendorf, after a German poet (Joseph Freiherr von Eichendorff), appeared in 1907, which was a result of the arrival of German settlers in 1904.

== History ==
The village could have been first mentioned in a Latin document of Diocese of Wrocław called Liber fundationis episcopatus Vratislaviensis from around 1305 as Friczkonis villa.

Politically the village belonged initially to the Duchy of Racibórz (in 1377 it was merged with Duchy of Opava, in 1491 Wodzisław was separated, including Skrzeczkowice), within feudally fragmented Poland. In 1327 the duchy became a fee of the Kingdom of Bohemia, which after 1526 became part of the Habsburg monarchy. After Silesian Wars it became a part of the Kingdom of Prussia.

As a private village it was sold in 1323 by a knight Piotr Steiner to somebody called Jeske-Riske. Henceforth the ownership was changing numerous times. In 1818 the territorial administration in Prussian Silesia was re-organized. Skrzeczkowice became a part of Rybnik County. In 1840 the village had 109 inhabitants, living in 17 houses, in 1890 it was 60 and in 1906 only 48. This number grew after parcellation of land in 1904, when 9 ethnic Germans settled here (another settled in Borynia Górna and Osiny). In 1910 30% of the inhabitants declared using only German-language, another 22% using both Polish and German, combined it was the highest percentage of German-speakers in Rybnik County.

After World War I in the Upper Silesia plebiscite 49 out of 76 voters in Skrzeczkowice voted in favour of staying in Germany, against 27 who opted for joining Poland. It became later a part of Silesian Voivodeship, Second Polish Republic. Around 80% of local Germans moved out, afterwards the village had about 330 inhabitants. It was then annexed by Nazi Germany at the beginning of World War II. After the war it was restored to Poland. In 1954 it became a part of a municipality with the seat in Borynia. In 1975 it was together with Borynia and Szeroka absorbed by Jastrzębie-Zdrój. In a local referendum held in 2000 the inhabitants of Borynia, Szeroka and Skrzeczkowice voted in favour of remaining within the city.
