= Borynia Coal Mine =

Coal mine in Jastrzębie-Zdrój, Poland

Borynia coal mine
- Location in Poland
- Location: Jastrzębie-Zdrój, Silesian Voivodeship, Poland; 49°59′58″N 018°36′46″E
- Products: Coal
- Production: 3,400,000
- Opened: 1971
- Company: Jastrzębska Spółka Węglowa

The Borynia coal mine is a large mine in the south of Poland in Jastrzębie-Zdrój, Silesian Voivodeship, 260 km south-west of the capital, Warsaw. Borynia has estimated reserves of 34 million tonnes of coal. The annual coal production is around 3.4 million tonnes.
