= Jastrzębie-Zdrój =

Jastrzębie-Zdrój Jastrzymbie-Zdroj (Silesian)
- City county
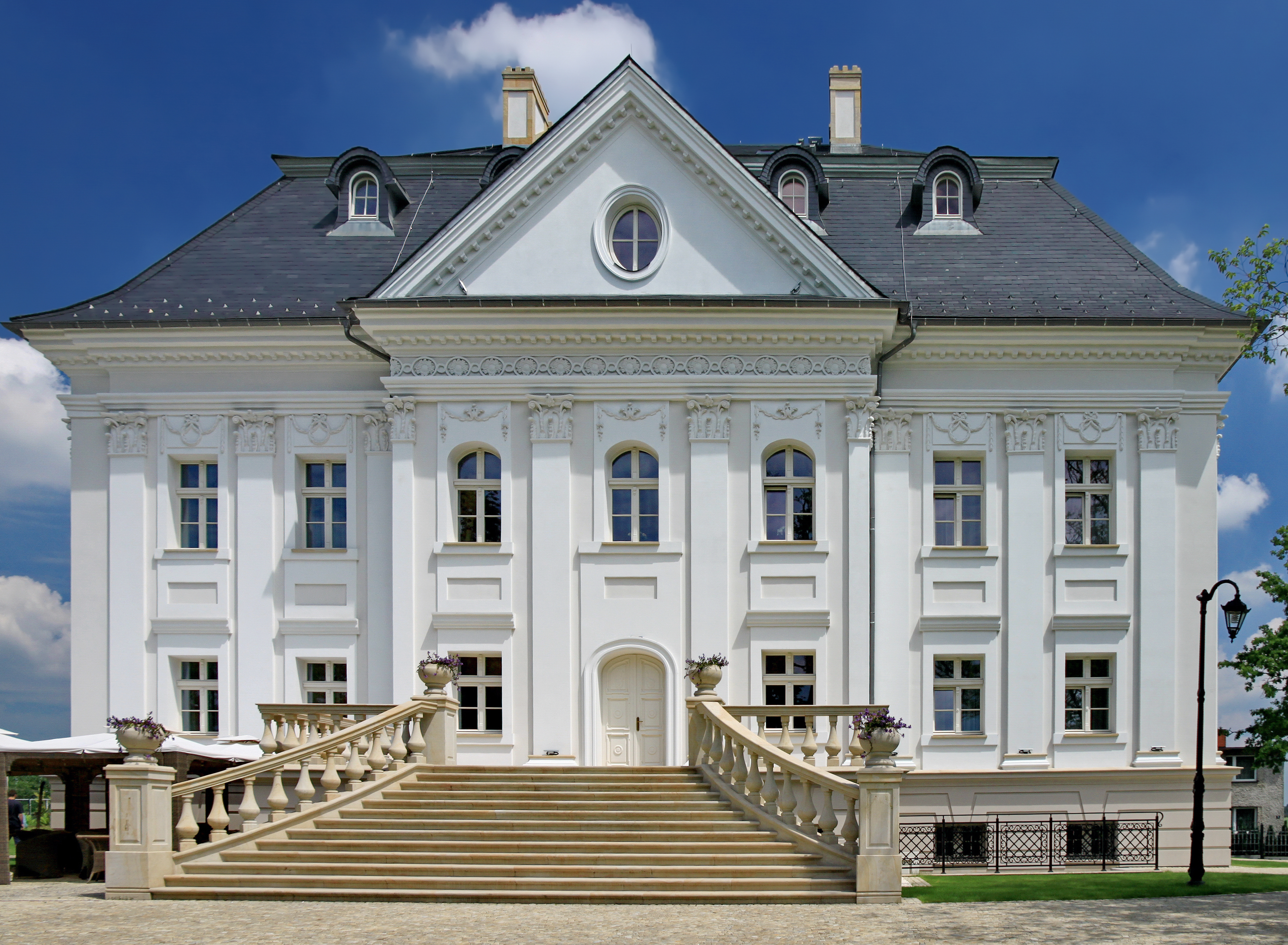
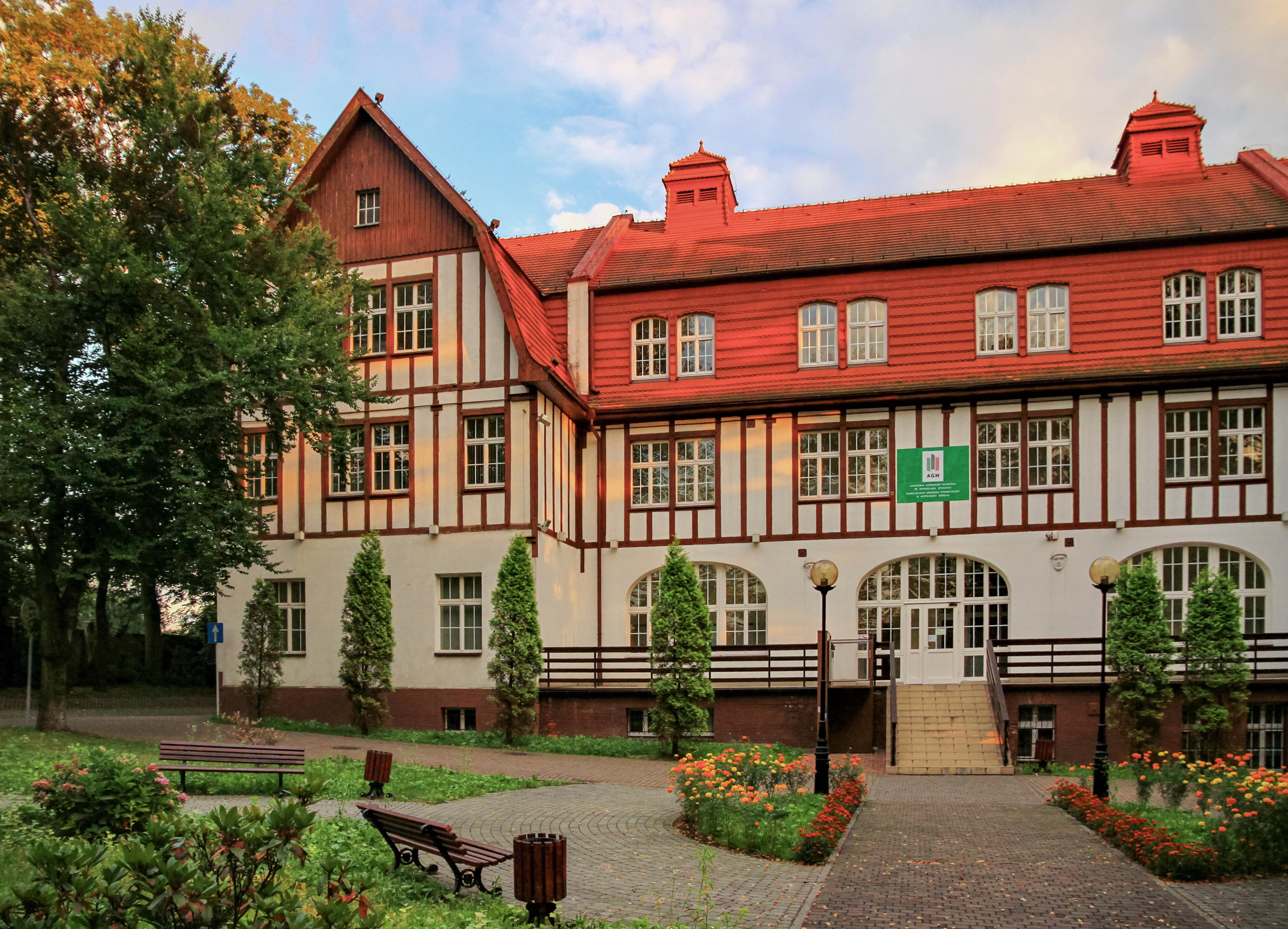
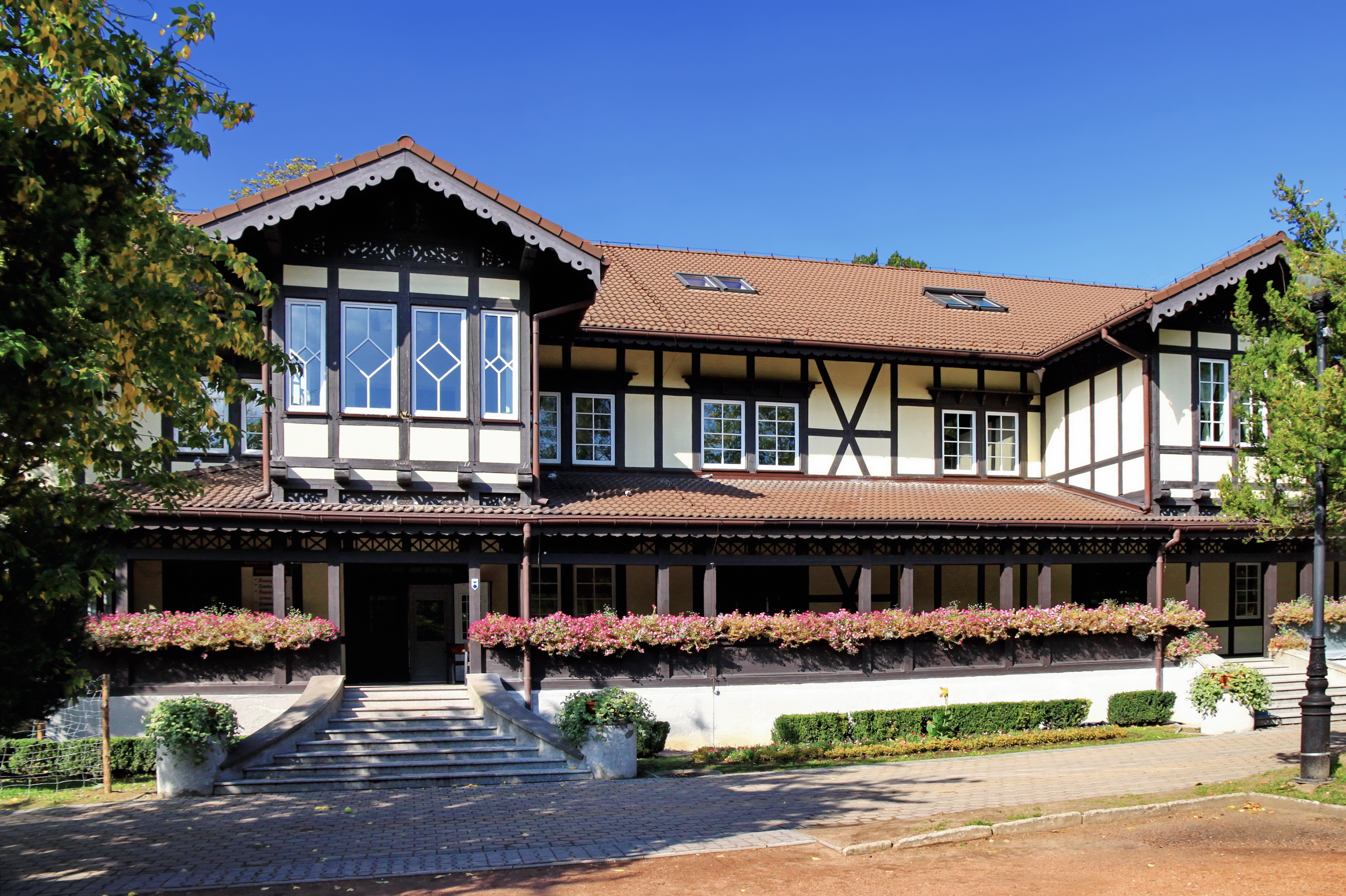
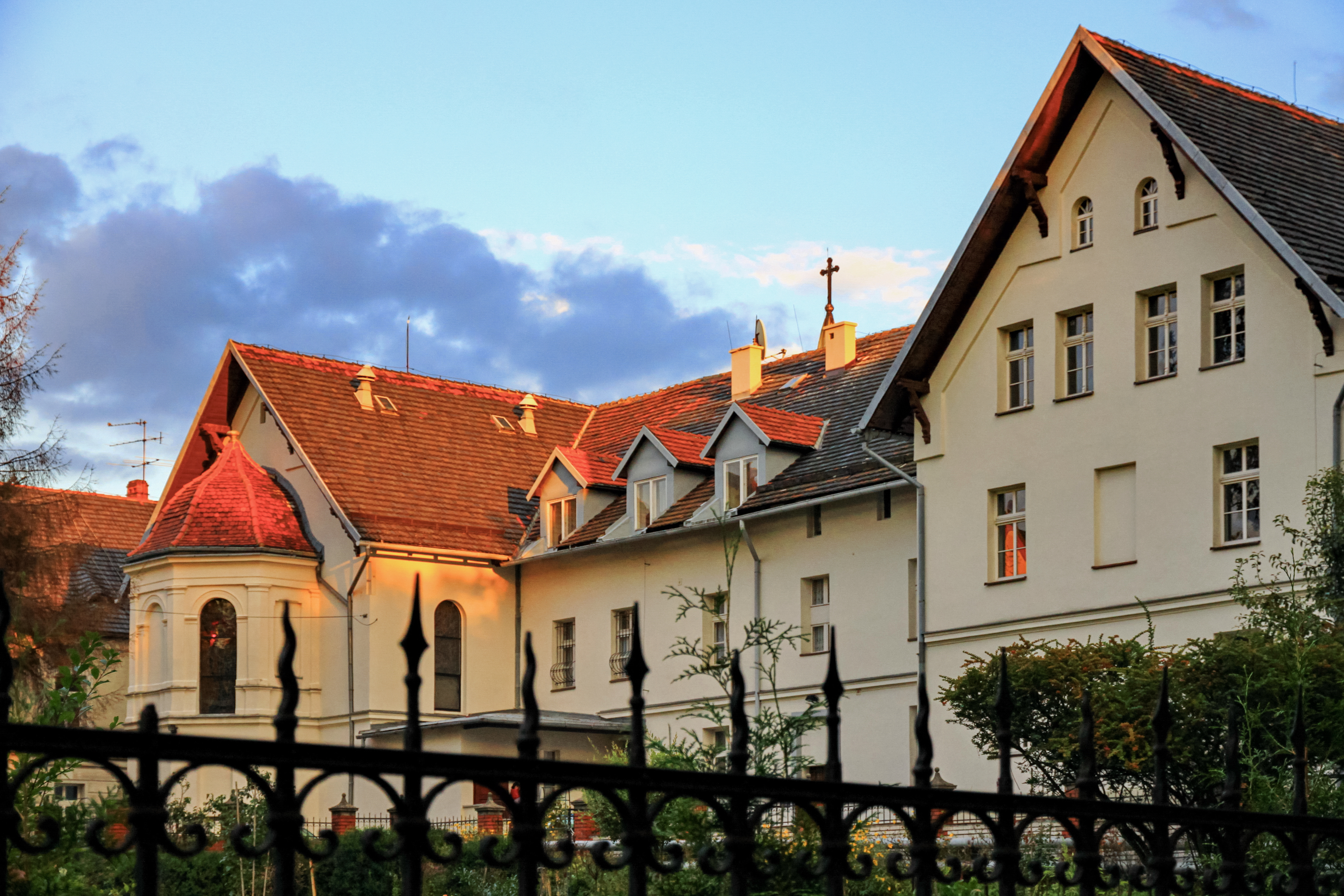
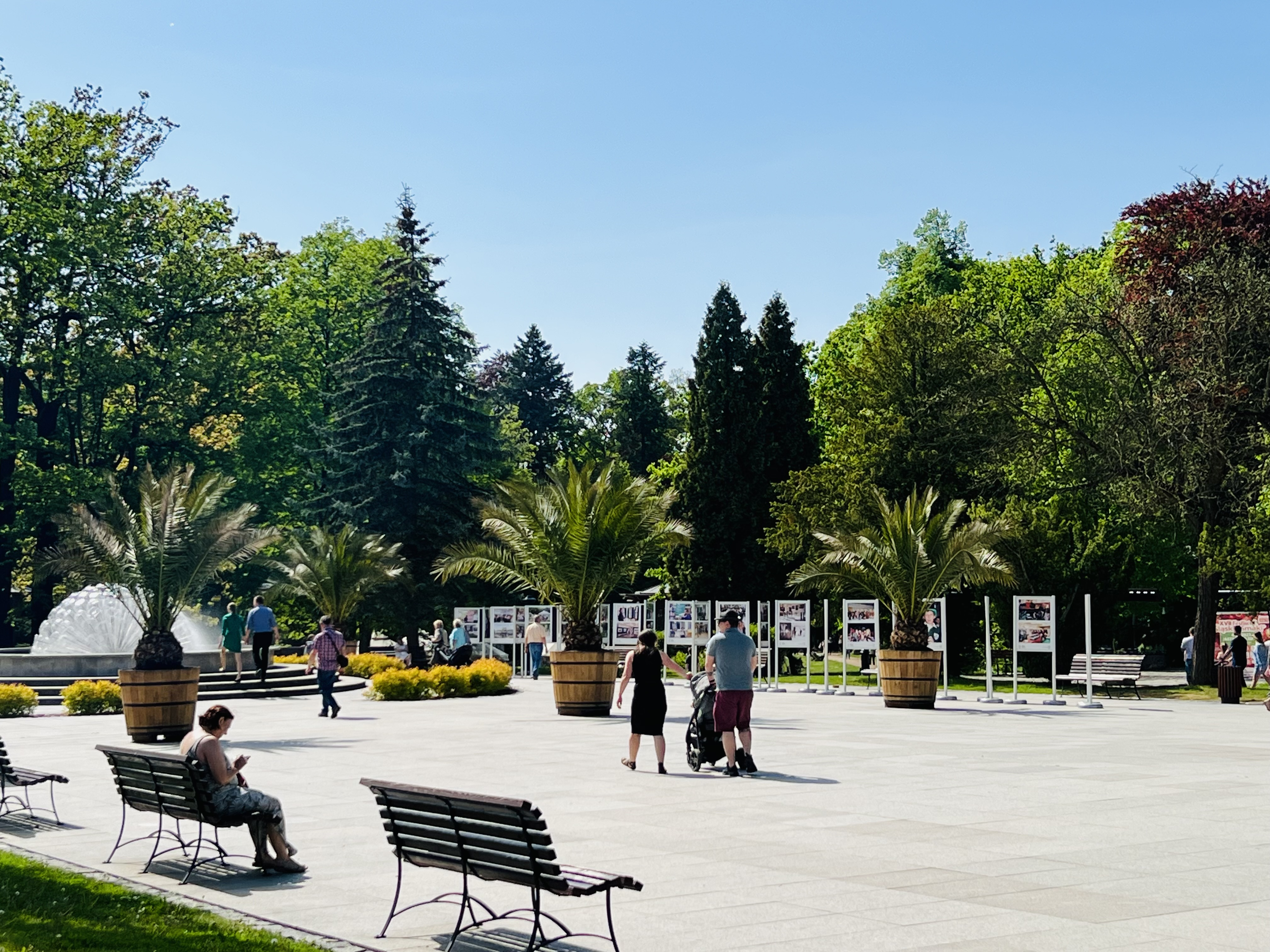
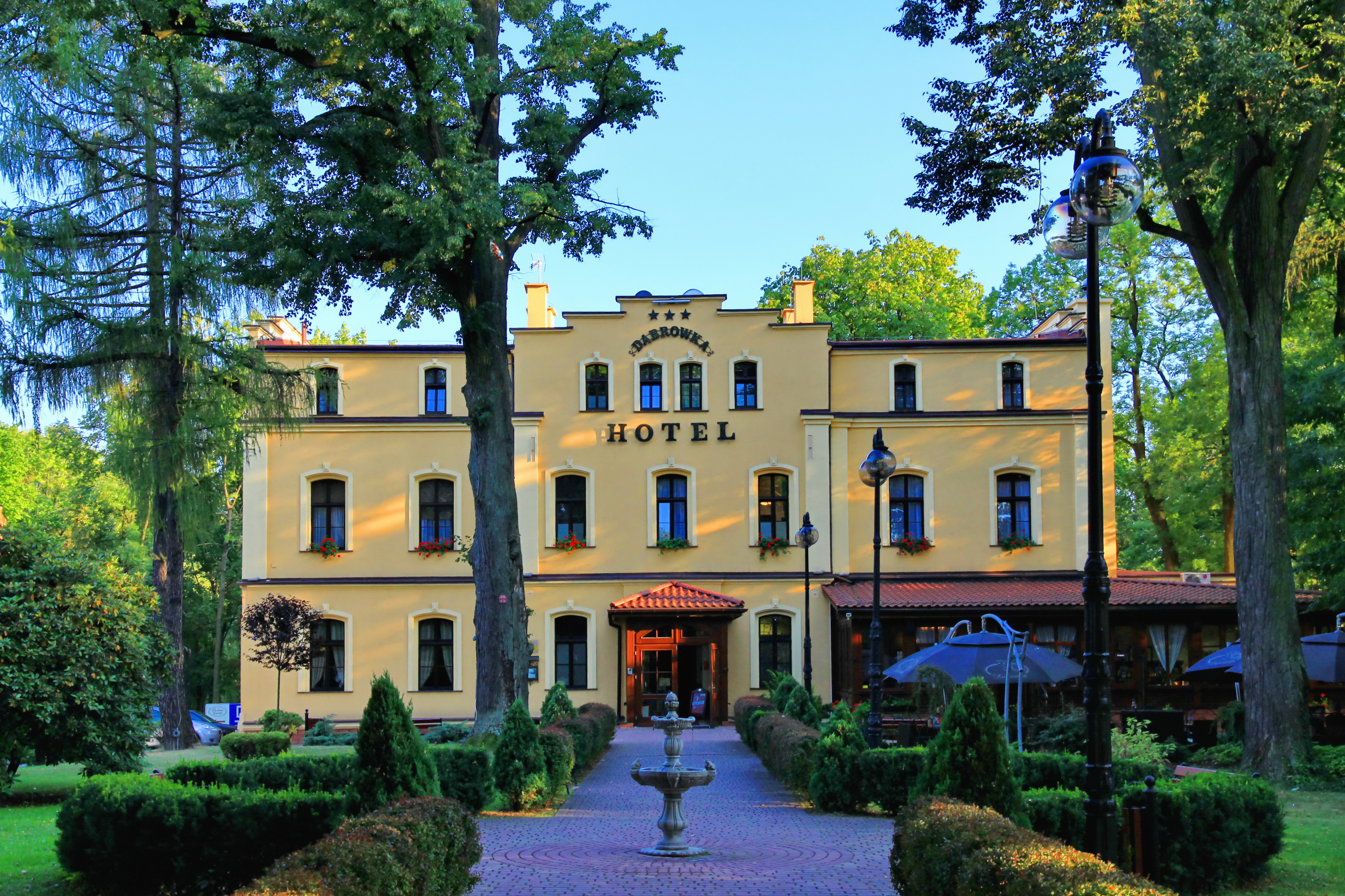
- Clockwise from top: Borynia Palace; Former Bracka Company Sanatorium; Drinking House; Sacred Heart of Jesus Church; Zdrojowy Park; Dąbrówka Hotel

- Flag Coat of arms
- Motto(s): Jastrzębie-Zdrój – city of youth, work and peace
- Location within Poland
- Coordinates: 49°57′N 18°35′E
- Country: Poland
- Voivodeship: Silesian
- County: city county
- Established: 14th century
- City rights: 1963

Government
  - City mayor: Michał Urgoł (PiS)

Area
  - Total: 85.44 km^{2} (32.99 sq mi)

Population (31 December 2021)
  - Total: 86,632 ▼
- Time zone: UTC+1 (CET)
  - Summer (DST): UTC+2 (CEST)
- Postal code: 44-330 to 44-335, 44-268
- Area code: +48 32
- Car plates: SJZ
- Website: http://www.jastrzebie.pl

Jastrzębie-Zdrój ([jaˈstʂɛmbjɛ ˈzdruj]; German: Bad Königsdorff-Jastrzemb, originally Jastrzemb; Czech: Lázně Jestřebí; Silesian: Jastrzymbie-Zdroj) is a city in the Silesian Voivodeship in southern Poland with 86,632 inhabitants (2021). Its name comes from the Polish words jastrząb ("hawk") and zdrój ("spa" or "spring").

From 1861 until the 20th century, it was an sanatorium village situated in Upper Silesia. It was granted city rights in 1963. In the early 1980s, the city was one of the main centers of workers' protests, which resulted in the creation of Solidarity.

== History ==
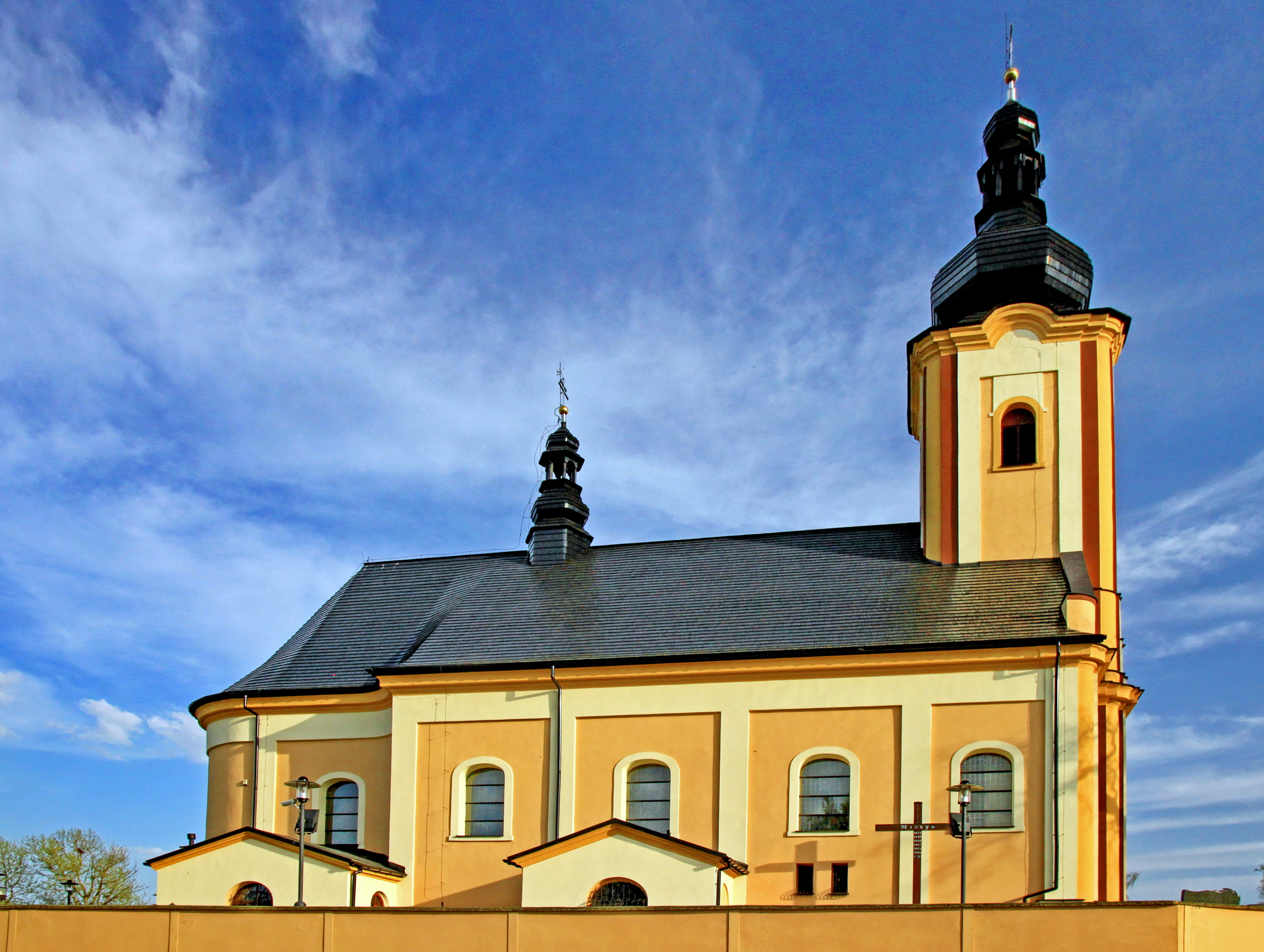
All Saints' Church, 1796–1801

The first written documentation, relating to this area, date back to around 1305 (Liber fundationis episcopatus Vratislaviensis), when it was part of fragmented Piast-ruled Poland. Administratively, the town is made up of several old settlements, whose origins go back to the distant past. The original name of the town was Jastrzemb. The origin of the name, which means 'hawk' in Polish, is connected with the legend of the black knight. From the 16th century to the beginning of the 19th century, it was part of the administration of Wodzisław. In the 18th century, it was annexed by Prussia. Between 1858 and 1860, trial excavations of hard coal were performed all over the area of Jastrzębie Dolne. These excavations ended up discovering springs containing iodine and bromine brine solutions. In 1860, the count of Königsdorff acquired the lands and suggested the construction of bath facilities. Thus, in 1862, the health resort of Bad Königsdorff-Jastrzemb was brought into life. Shortly after, the town joined the exclusive circle of the most prestigious health resorts in Europe.

In 1896, the natural health centre was taken over by a Polish doctor, Mikołaj Witczak, who oversaw the development of health resort in Bad Königsdorff-Jastrzemb. Trough his management and wise investments, the resort became well-known sanatorium within the German Empire and interbellum Poland. Further resort facilities were built in the following years.

In the plebiscite in Silesia in 1921, about 85% of the inhabitants of Jastrzębie Zdrój voted for Poland, a significant part of the inhabitants also took part in the Silesian uprisings in order to re-unite with Poland. Finally, in 1922, Jastrzębie-Zdrój was incorporated into Poland.

During World War II, Jastrzębie was occupied by Germany.

The history of Jastrzębie-Zdrój as a health resort came to its end in the 1960s, when all over the area began the intensive exploitation of coking coal deposits. Within a period of 12 years, five coal mines were set up. Between 1954–1975, Jastrzębie was part of the Wodzisław County. From 1975 to 1998, it was administratively located in the Katowice Voivodeship. During the time of political transformation in Poland, Jastrzębie-Zdrój went down in the annals of Polish modern history as the place where the Jastrzębie-Zdrój Agreement was concluded. The signing of the protocol initiated the process of political, economic and social changes in Poland.

== Population and location ==
The city itself had 91,723 inhabitants; its density is 1,047.9 per km² (as of January 31, 2012). Jastrzębie-Zdrój ranks as Poland's 36th largest city. Jastrzębie-Zdrój's unemployment rate is lower (7%) than the national average of 8.8% (as of November 2010).

== Districts ==
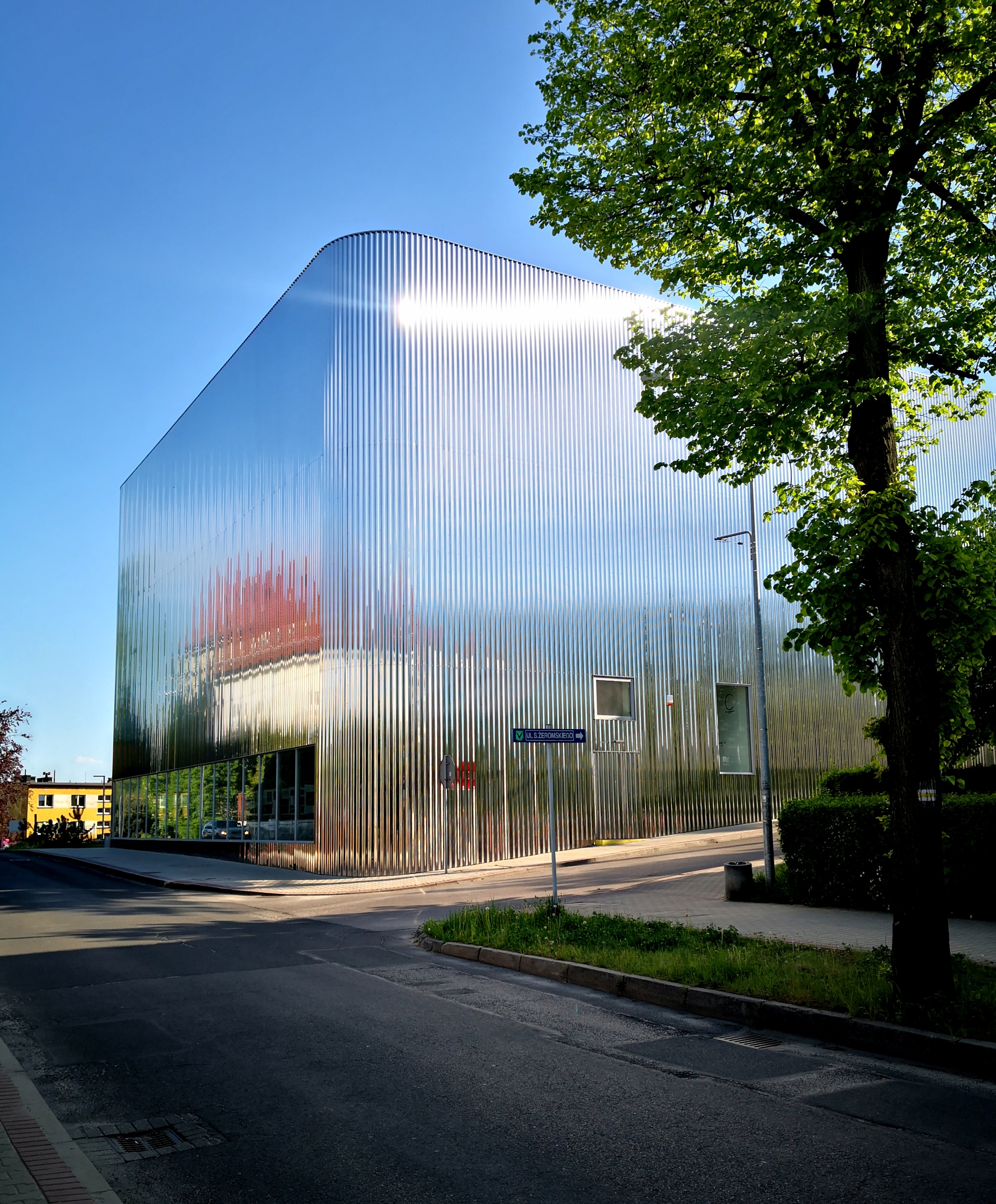
Jastrzębie Philharmonic

Jastrzębie-Zdrój is a powiat (county) divided into 15 districts and 6 sołectwos that have its own administrative body. Most of the districts are suburban, some are densely built with many blocks of flats generating huge housing estates, and the rest are of civic nature.

1. Arki Bożka (6,632 inhabitants)
2. Barbary (10,185 inhabitants)
3. Bogoczowiec (1,672 inhabitants)
4. Chrobrego (5,042 inhabitants)
5. Gwarków (8,126 inhabitants)
6. Jastrzębie Górne i Dolne (4,369 inhabitants)
7. Morcinka (4,534 inhabitants)
8. Pionierów (11,210 inhabitants)
9. Przyjaźń (4,718 inhabitants)
10. Staszica (6,079 inhabitants)
11. Tuwima (480 inhabitants)
12. Tysiąclecia (3,242 inhabitants)
13. Zdrój (7,682 inhabitants)
14. Złote Łany (1,118 inhabitants)
15. Zofiówka (3,473 inhabitants)

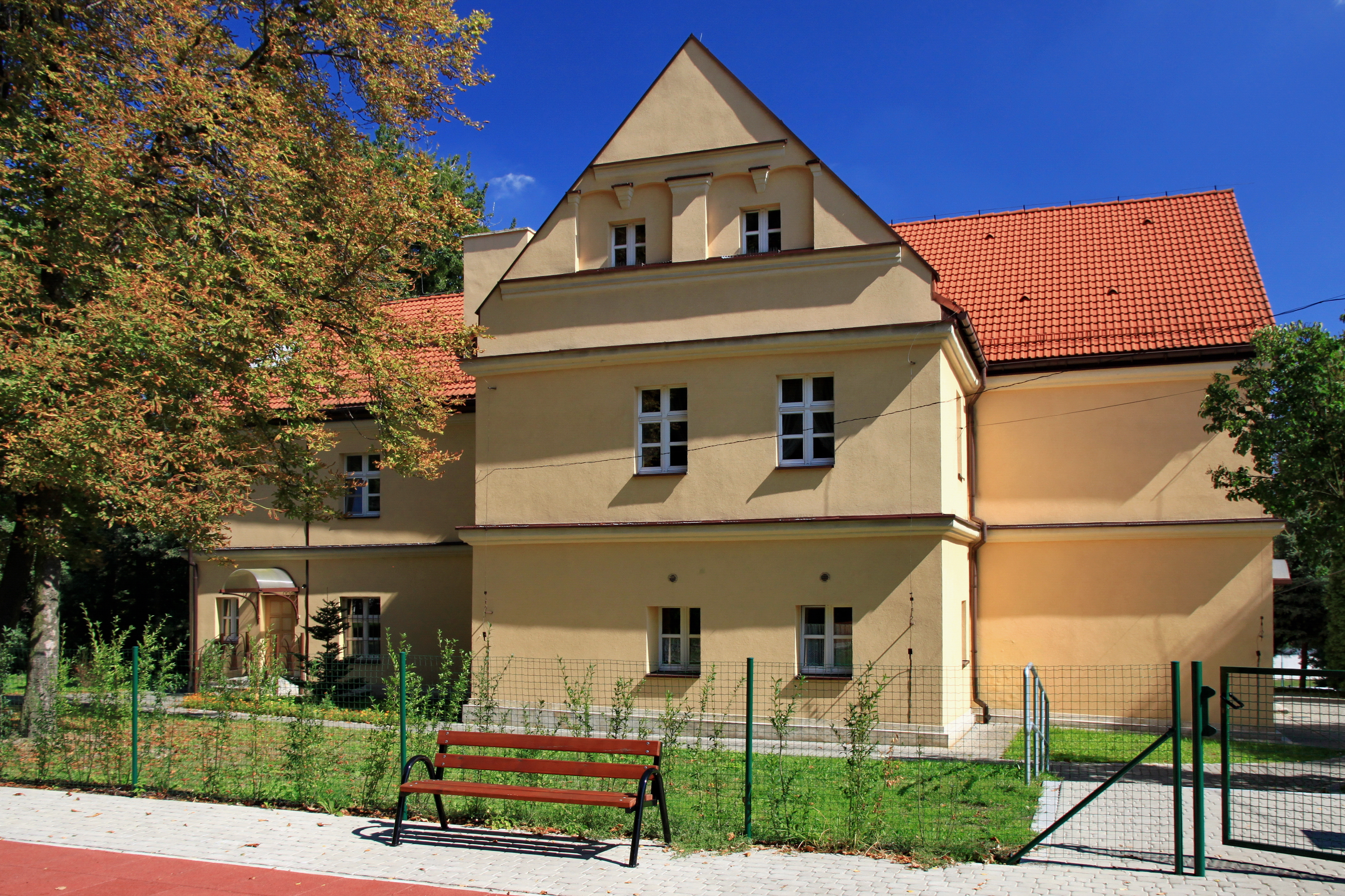
Renaissance defensive manor house of the Rostek and Skrebeński families in Bzie, now a preschool

Sołectwos:

1. Borynia (1,918 inhabitants)
2. Bzie (3,602 inhabitants)
3. Moszczenica (3,026 inhabitants)
4. Ruptawa (3,767 inhabitants)
5. Skrzeczkowice (694 inhabitants)
6. Szeroka (2,273 inhabitants)

== Sports ==
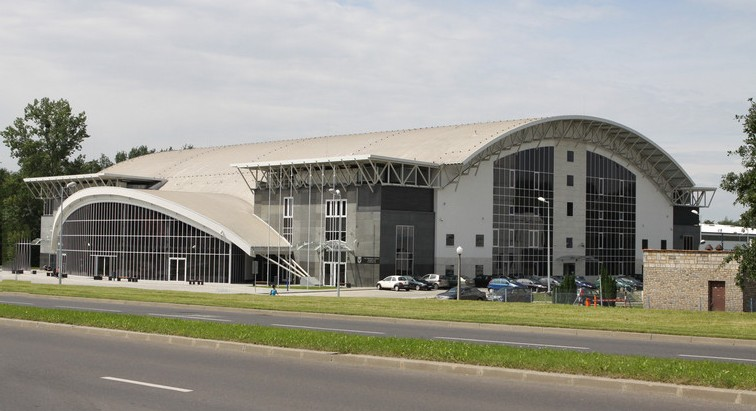
Hala Widowiskowo-Sportowa, home venue of the Jastrzębski Węgiel volleyball club

The most famous clubs

- Jastrzębski Węgiel – men's professional volleyball club, four–time Polish Champions, one-time Polish Cup winners, two-time CEV Champions League finalists, PlusLiga
- JKH GKS Jastrzębie – men's professional ice hockey club, one-time Polish Champions, four-time Polish Cup winners, Polska Hokej Liga
- GKS Jastrzębie – men's professional football club

Other clubs

- BKS Jastrzębie – boxing
- UKH Białe Jastrzębie – women's ice hockey
- LKS Granica Ruptawa – football
- LKS Zryw Bzie – football
- LKS Hadex Szeroka – football
- Koka Jastrzębie – judo
- UKS Romi Jastrzębie – women's handball

== Notable people ==
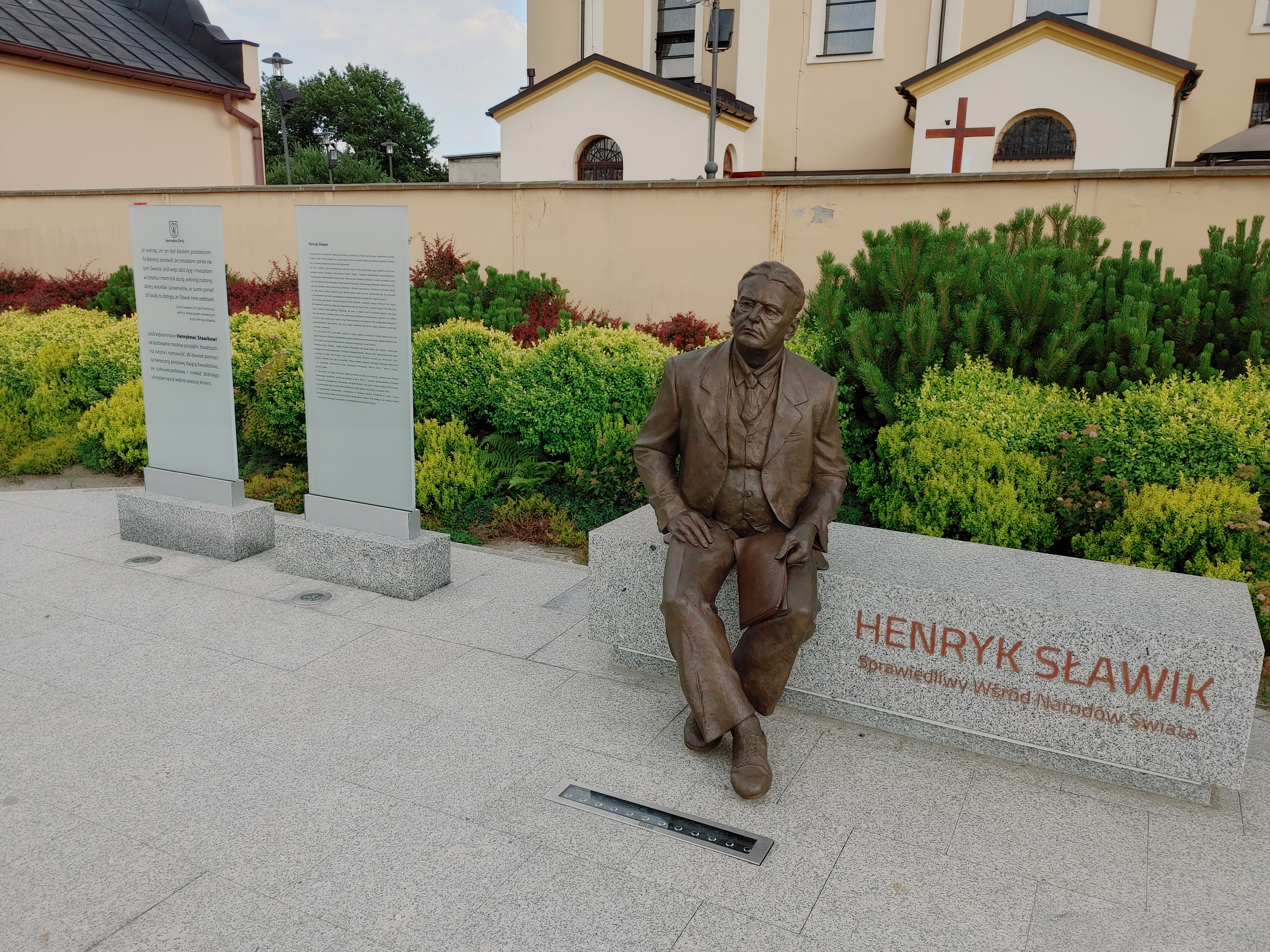
Henryk Sławik monument

- Henryk Sławik (1894–1944), Polish politician, social worker, activist, and diplomat
- Urszula Wybraniec-Skardowska (born 1940), Polish logician
- Krystian Lupa (born 1943), Polish theatre director, set designer, playwright, translator and pedagogue
- Magdalena Lewy-Boulet (born 1973), American athlete
- Leszek Laszkiewicz (born 1978), Polish ice hockey player and executive
- Marcin Radzewicz (born 1980), Polish footballer
- Dariusz Kłus (born 1981), Polish footballer
- Łukasz Pielorz (born 1983), Polish footballer
- Kamil Glik (born 1988), Polish footballer
- Michał Skóraś (born 2000), Polish footballer

== Twin towns – sister cities ==
Jastrzębie-Zdrój is twinned with:

- Borshchiv, Ukraine (2017)
- Havířov, Czech Republic (2007)
- Ibbenbüren, Germany (2007)
- Karviná, Czech Republic (1995)
- Prievidza, Slovakia (2009)
- Tourcoing, France (2007)
