= Urszula Wybraniec-Skardowska =

Polish logician (born 1940)

Urszula Wybraniec-Skardowska (born 1940) is a Polish logician whose research topics have included rough sets and inference rules for rejecting certain propositions as invalid.

== Education and career ==
Wybraniec-Skardowska was born in Jastrzębie-Zdrój, in 1940. She graduated from the University of Wrocław in 1963, with a master's degree in mathematics, earned a Ph.D. in mathematics there in 1967, and completed her habilitation in humanistic sciences (D.Sc.) in 1985.

She was given the title of professor in 1992. She worked at the University of Opole for many years, including as full professor from 1995 to 2005. After retiring from Opole she worked at WSB Merito University in Chorzów as head of the department of logic and methodology of sciences from 2005 to 2010, and also at Cardinal Stefan Wyszyński University in Warsaw.

== Books ==
Wybraniec-Skardowska is the author of Theory of Language Syntax: Categorial Approach (Kluwer, 1991), and the editor of The Lvov–Warsaw School: Past and Present (with Ángel Garrido, Springer/Birkhauser, 2018). She is also an author of several books in Polish.
