= Henryk Sławik =

Polish politician (1894–1944)

- Henryk Sławik
- Born: 16 July 1894; Timmendorf, German Empire (now part of Jastrzębie-Zdrój, Poland)
- Died: 23 August 1944 (aged 50); Gusen concentration camp, Austria
- Cause of death: Hanging
- Occupation: Politician
- Known for: Holocaust rescue
- Honours: Righteous Among the Nations, Order of the White Eagle (Poland)

Henryk Sławik (16 July 1894 – 23 August 1944) was a Polish politician in the interwar period, social worker, activist, and diplomat, who during World War II helped save over 30,000 Polish refugees, including 5,000 Polish Jews in Budapest, Hungary, by giving them false Polish passports with Catholic designation. He was executed with some of his fellow Polish activists on orders of Reichsführer SS in concentration camp Gusen on 23 August 1944.

== Life ==
Henryk Sławik was born 16 July 1894 in Timmendorf (now Szeroka, a part of Jastrzębie-Zdrój), into an impoverished Polish Silesian family as one of its 5 children. He was sent by his mother to an academic secondary school. After graduation, Sławik left his hometown for Pszczyna where he was drafted to the army during World War I. Released from internment in 1918, he joined the Polish Socialist Party in Upper Silesia and went to Warsaw for additional training. He took active part in the Silesian Plebiscite as one of its organizers and began working as a journalist for Gazeta Robotnicza. A year later, he became its editor-in-chief.

In 1922 Sławik was elected president of the Regional Chapter of the Worker's Youth Association "Siła" and took part in setting up Worker's Universities. In 1928 he married a Varsovian, Jadwiga Purzycka, and in 1929 was chosen as councillor for Katowice City Hall on PPS platform. He was an ardent opponent of Sanacja. Between 1934 and 1939 Sławik served as president of Polish Journalist Association of Silesia and Zagłębie (Syndykat Dziennikarzy Polskich Śląska i Zagłębia).

=== World War II ===
At the outbreak of the German invasion of Poland in 1939 Sławik joined the Polish mobilised police battalion attached to the Kraków Army. He fought with distinction during the retreat along the northern Carpathians. His battalion was attached to the 2nd Mountain Brigade, with which he defended mountain passes leading to Slovakia. On 15 September Sławik and his men were ordered to retreat towards the newly established border with Hungary. On 17 September, after the Soviet Union joined the war against Poland, Sławik crossed the border and was interned as a prisoner of war camp. In Silesia, his name appeared on the Nazi German list of the "enemies of the state" (Sonderfahndungsbuch Polen).

Sławik was spotted in the PoW camp near Miskolc by József Antall (Senior), a member of the Hungarian ministry of internal affairs responsible for the civilian refugees and the father of the future prime minister József Antall (Junior). Thanks to his fluent knowledge of German, Sławik was brought to Budapest and allowed to create the Citizen's Committee for Help for Polish Refugees (Komitet Obywatelski ds. Opieki nad Polskimi Uchodźcami). Together with József Antall he organised jobs for the POWs and displaced persons, schools and orphanages. He also clandestinely organised an organisation whose purpose was to help the exiled Poles leave the camps of internment and travel to France or the Middle East to join the Polish Army. His colleague was Ernest Niżałowski lieutenant and interpreter, who was a Polish-Hungarian citizen. Sławik also became a delegate of the Polish Government in Exile.

=== The Polish Wallenberg ===
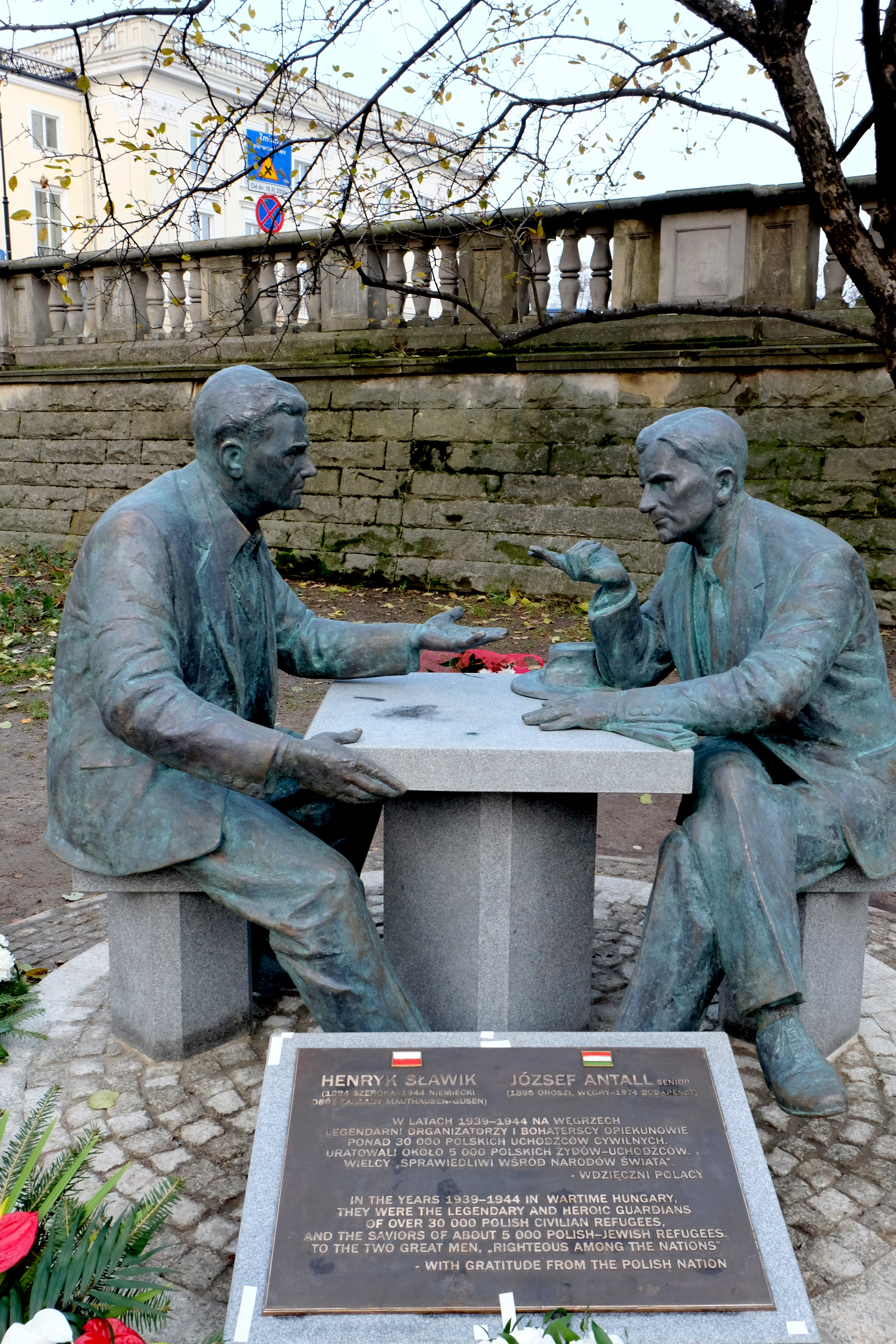
Monument to Henryk Sławik and József Antall in Warsaw

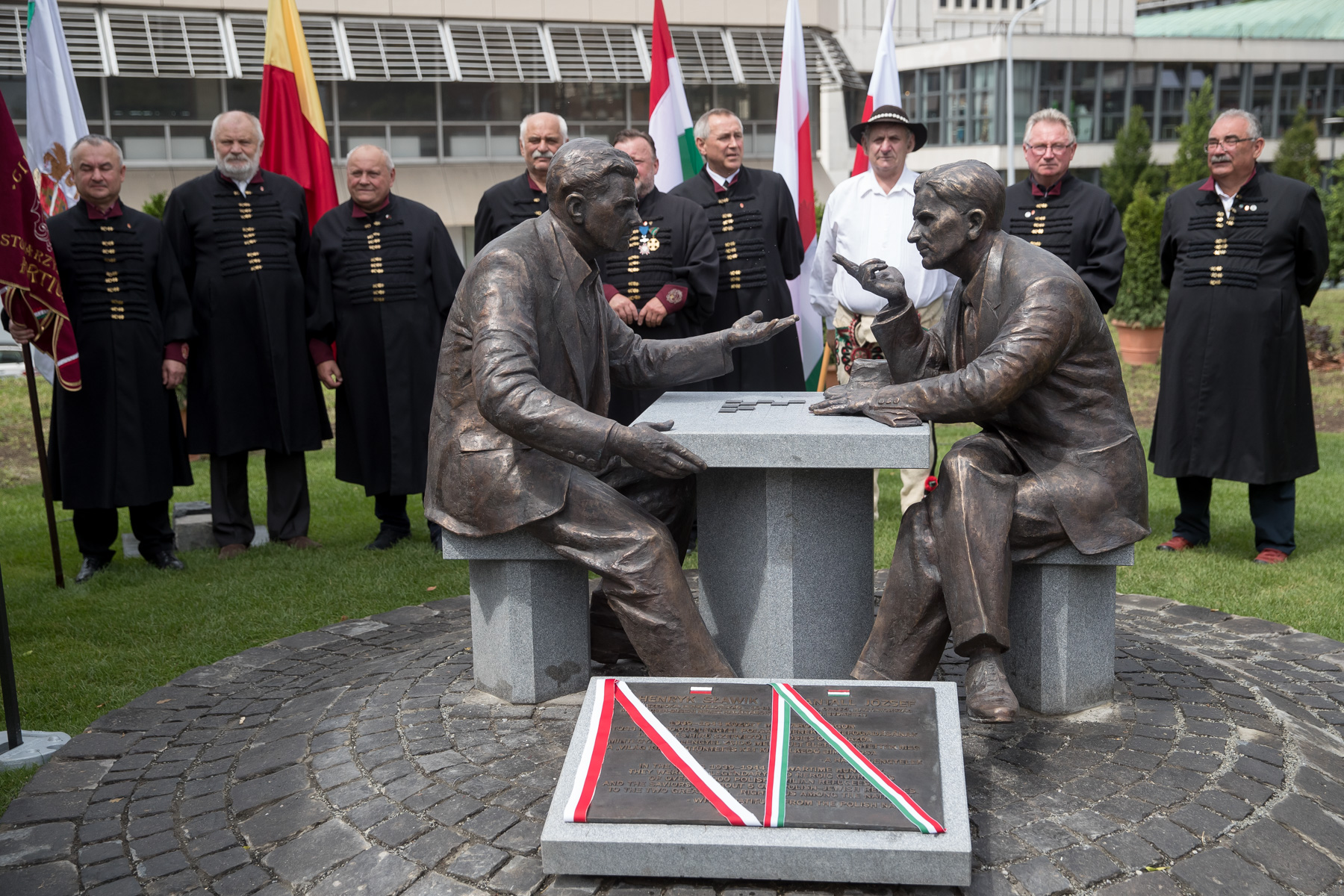
Monument to Henryk Sławik and József Antall in Budapest

After the Hungarian government issued racial decrees and separated Polish refugees of Jewish descent from their colleagues, Sławik, along with Zvi Henryk Zimmerman and Antall, started to issue false documents confirming their Polish roots and Roman Catholic faith. He also helped several hundred Polish Jews to reach Yugoslav Partisans. One of his initiatives was the creation of an orphanage for Jewish children (officially named School for Children of Polish Officers) in Vác. To help disguise the true nature of the orphanage, the children were visited by Catholic Church authorities, most notably by nuncio Angelo Rotta.

After the Nazis took over Hungary in March 1944, Sławik went underground and ordered as many of the refugees as were under his command to leave Hungary. Because he had appointed a new commanding officer of the camp for Polish Jews, all of them were able to escape and leave Hungary. The Jewish children of the orphanage in Vác were also evacuated. Sławik was arrested by the Germans on 19 March 1944. Although brutally tortured, he did not inform on his Hungarian colleagues. He was sent to the concentration camp Gusen where he was hanged with some of his fellows on 23 August 1944. His wife survived the Ravensbrück concentration camp and after the war found their daughter hidden in Hungary by the Antall family. Sławik's place of burial remains unknown.

It is estimated that Henryk Sławik helped as many as 30,000 Polish refugees in Hungary, approximately 5,000 of them Jews. After 1948, the communist authorities of both Poland and Hungary did commemorate his deeds and pointed out his importance for humanity. According to Maria Zawadzka of the Museum of the History of Polish Jews, Henryk Sławik was posthumously awarded the title of Righteous Among the Nations by Yad Vashem Commemorative Authority already on 26 January 1977, but achieved wide recognition only after Zvi Henryk Zimmerman, his wartime associate and a distinguished Israeli politician, popularized his efforts in the 1990s.

== See also ==
- Irena Sendler
- Raoul Wallenberg, diplomat
- International Raoul Wallenberg Foundation (IRWF; Buenos Aires, New York, Berlin, Rio de Janeiro, Jerusalem)
- List of Poles
