= Zarzecze, Cieszyn County =

Zarzecze
- Village
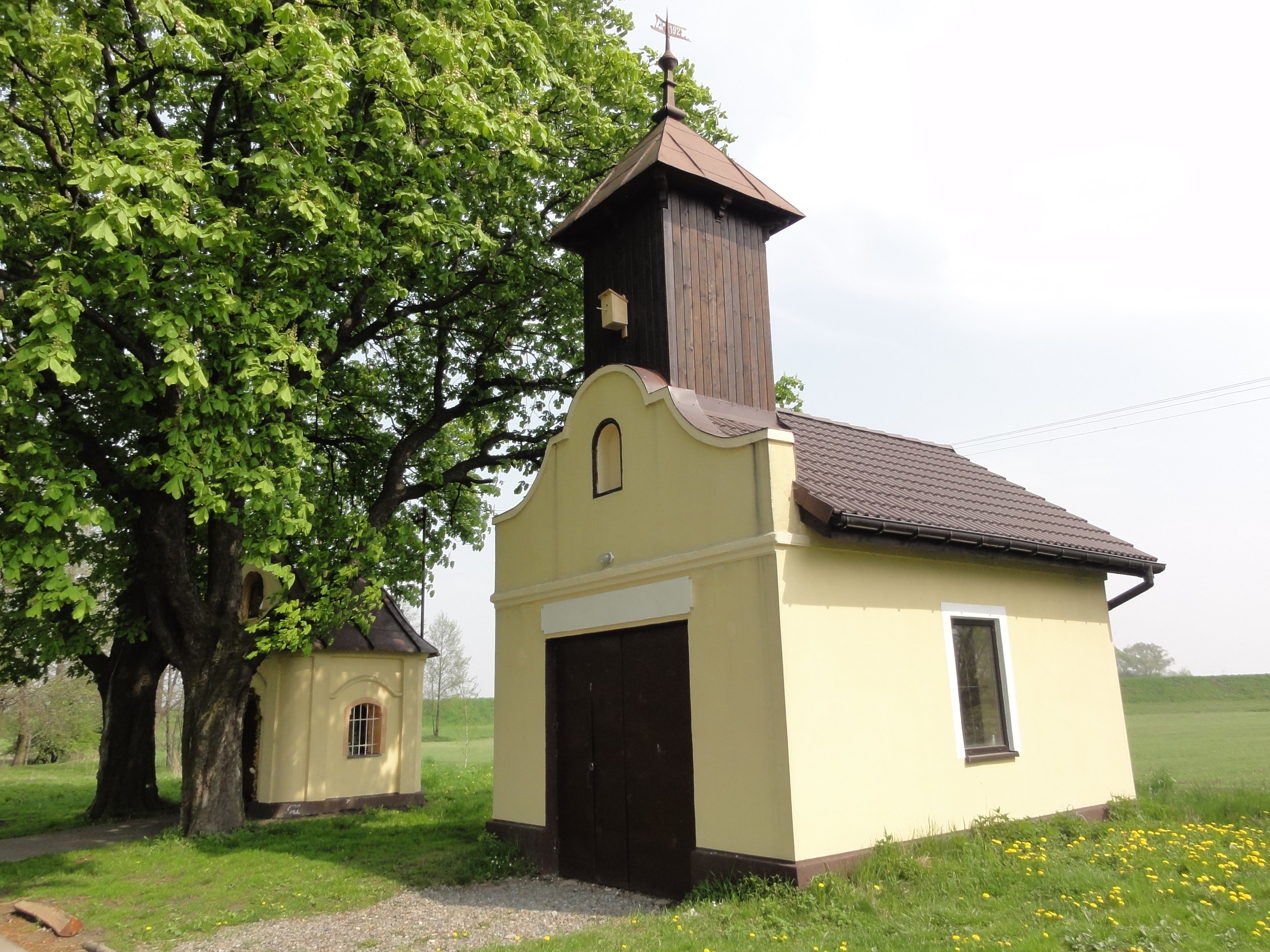
- Former fire station and a chapel

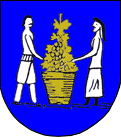
- Coat of arms

- Location within Poland
- Coordinates: 49°54′46.84″N 18°50′3.5″E
- Country: Poland
- Voivodeship: Silesian
- County: Cieszyn
- Gmina: Chybie
- First mentioned: 1223

Government
  - Mayor: Franciszek Stokłosa
- Area: 3.37 km^{2} (1.30 sq mi)
- Population (2008): 313
  - Density: 92.9/km^{2} (241/sq mi)
- Time zone: UTC+1 (CET)
  - Summer (DST): UTC+2 (CEST)
- Postal code: 43-520
- Car plates: SCI

Zarzecze [zaˈʐɛt͡ʂɛ] is a village in Gmina Chybie, Cieszyn County, Silesian Voivodeship, southern Poland. It lies on the right southern bank of the Goczałkowice Reservoir on the river Vistula. Contemporary territory covers only a small part of the former village existing since the 13th century, as it was inundated during the creation of Goczałkowice Reservoir in the 1950s.

The name is of topographic origin and literally means [a place] behind a river (Polish: za rzeką, whereas rzeka means a river).

== History ==
It is one of the oldest villages in Cieszyn Silesia. It was first mentioned in a document of Bishop of Wrocław issued on 23 May 1223 for Norbertine Sisters in Rybnik among villages paying them a tithe, as Zasere. The name Zarzecze, [a place] behind a river, indicates that the primordial settlers came from the northern bank of the Vistula river (most probably from the village of Wisła, contemporary Wisła Wielka and Wisła Mała), and it could have been a part of the land that was ceded by Duke Casimir II the Just to Mieszko I Tanglefoot around 1177.

Subsequently, it belonged then to the Duchy of Opole and Racibórz and the Castellany of Cieszyn, which was in 1290 formed in the process of feudal fragmentation of Poland into the Duchy of Teschen, ruled by a local branch of Silesian Piast dynasty. In 1327 the duchy became a fee of the Kingdom of Bohemia, which after 1526 became a part of the Habsburg monarchy.

In years 1573/1577–1594 it belonged to Skoczów-Strumień state country that was split from the Duchy of Teschen but was later purchased back.

After Revolutions of 1848 in the Austrian Empire a modern municipal division was introduced in the re-established Austrian Silesia. The village as a municipality was subscribed to the political district of Bielsko and the legal district of Strumień. According to the censuses conducted in 1880, 1890, 1900 and 1910 the population of the municipality grew from 2121 in 1880 to 2529 in 1910 with a majority being native Polish-speakers (between 98.6% and 99.6%) accompanied by a small German-speaking minority (at most 33 or 1.4% in 1900), in terms of religion in 1910 majority were Roman Catholics (99.2%), followed by 15 Jews and 2 Protestants.

After World War I, fall of Austria-Hungary, Polish–Czechoslovak War and the division of Cieszyn Silesia in 1920, it became a part of Poland. It was then annexed by Nazi Germany at the beginning of World War II. After the war it was restored to Poland.

Most of the former Zarzecze territory was engulfed by waters from the Goczałkowice Reservoir in 1955, including its centre with the church built in 1789.

== People ==
Folklorist and writer Ludwik Kobiela was born in the village.

== Gallery ==
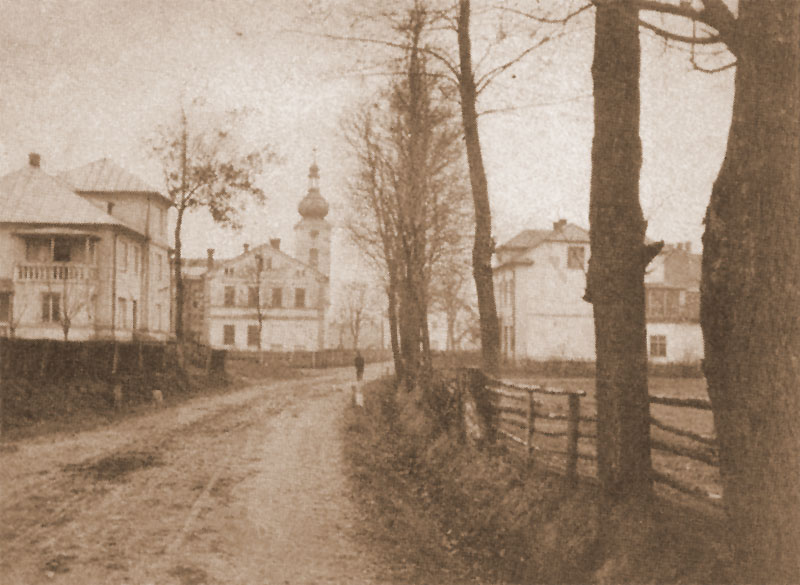
Village's centre before 1955

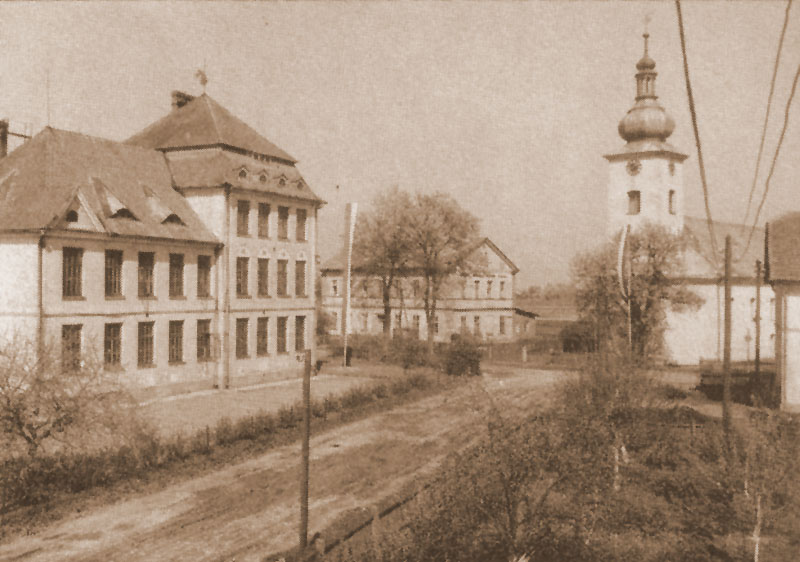
Village's centre before 1955

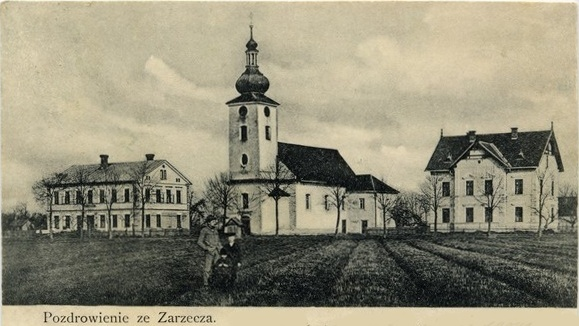
The Church of NMP Śnieżnej built in 1789 and drowned in 1955
