= Studzionka =

- Village
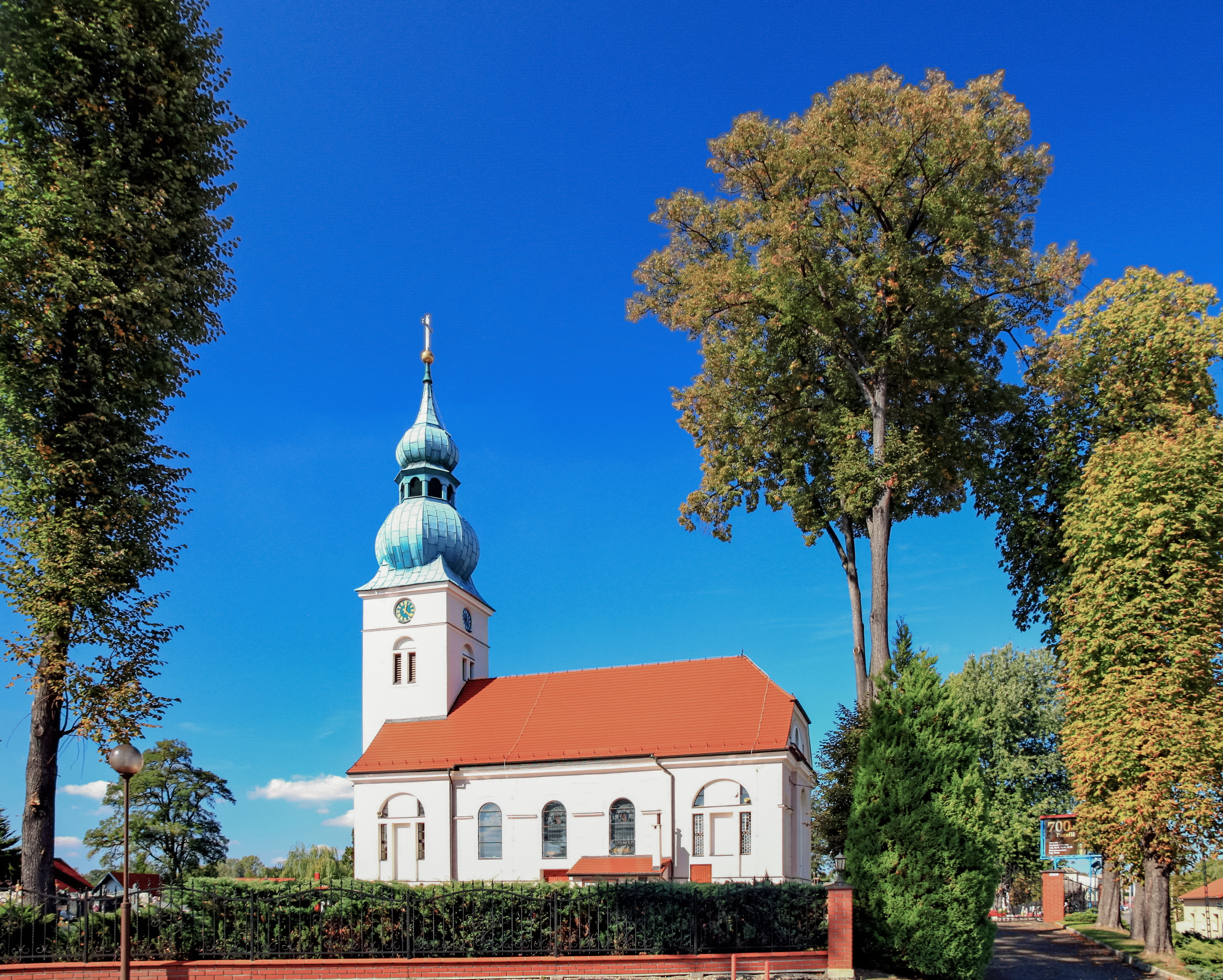
- Roman Catholic parish church in Studzionka

- Coat of arms

- Location within Poland
- Coordinates: 49°57′40″N 18°46′30″E
- Country: Poland
- Voivodeship: Silesian
- County: Pszczyna
- Gmina: Pszczyna
- Population: 2,150
- Time zone: UTC+1 (CET)
  - Summer (DST): UTC+2 (CEST)
- Vehicle registration: SPS

Studzionka [stuˈd͡ʑɔnka] is a village in the administrative district of Gmina Pszczyna, within Pszczyna County, Silesian Voivodeship, in southern Poland.

== History ==
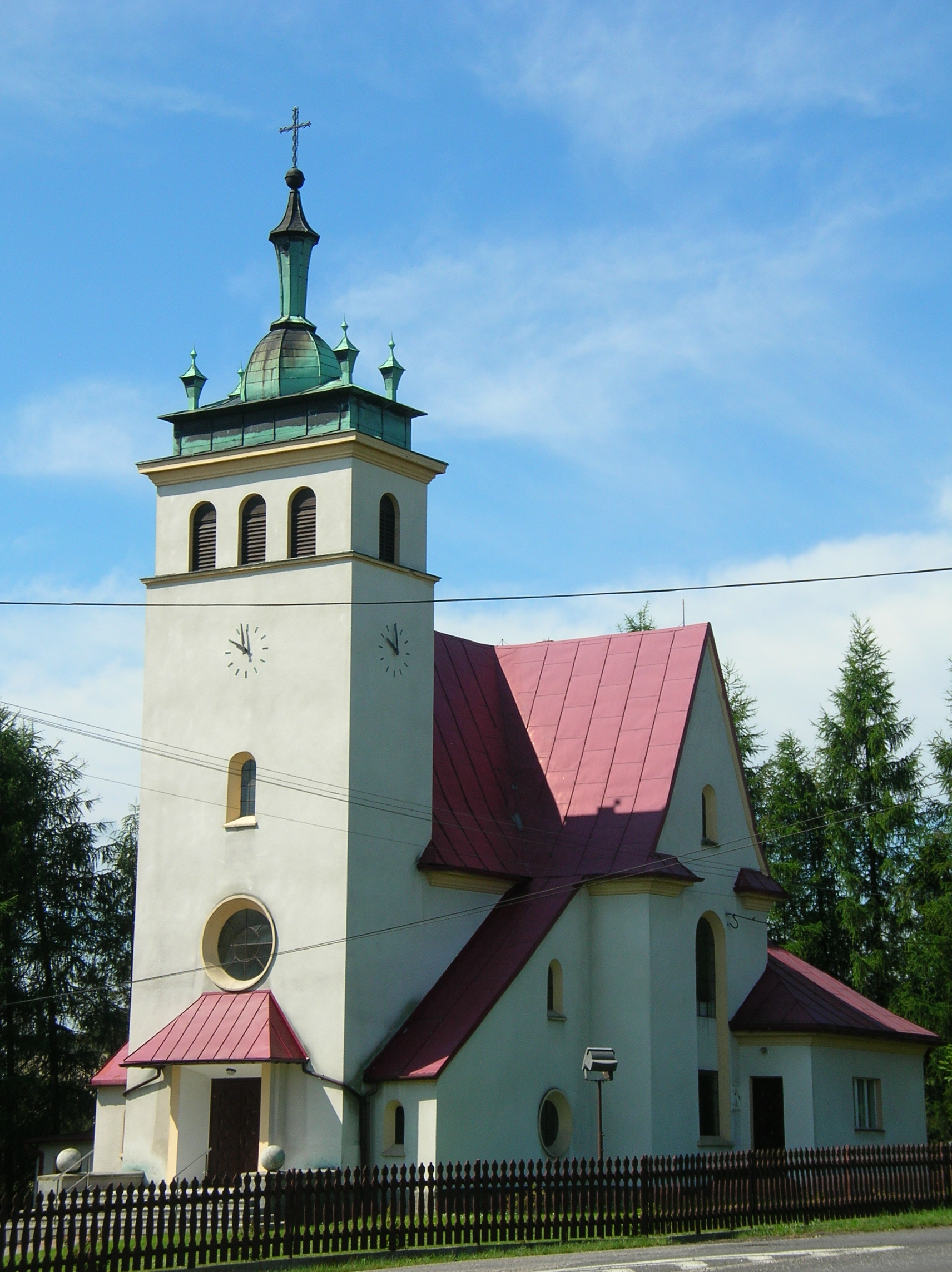
Protestant church

In the Middle Ages, the area was part of the territory of the Vistulans tribe, one of the Polish tribes. It became part of the emerging Polish state in the 10th century. As a result of the fragmentation of Poland, it was part of the Polish Seniorate Province and Duchy of Racibórz. The village was first mentioned in a Latin document of Diocese of Wrocław called Liber fundationis episcopatus Vratislaviensis from around 1305 as item in Stuczonka deberit [debent] esse XL mansi. The local Catholic parish was then first mentioned in 1326 in the register of Peter's Pence payment among Catholic parishes of Oświęcim deaconry of the Diocese of Kraków as Studna. The parish remained in Kraków diocese until the Reformation, afterwards was transferred to Diocese of Wrocław.

During the political upheaval caused by Matthias Corvinus the land around Pszczyna was overtaken by Casimir II, Duke of Cieszyn, who sold it in 1517 to the Hungarian magnates of the Thurzó family, forming the Pless state country. In the accompanying sales document issued on 21 February 1517 the village was mentioned as Studenka. With the Kingdom of Bohemia, in 1526, it became part of the Habsburg monarchy. In the War of the Austrian Succession most of Silesia was conquered by the Kingdom of Prussia, including the village, and in 1871 it became part of the German Empire. After World War I, Poland regained independence, and afterwards the village was reintegrated with the reborn Polish state.

During the German occupation (World War II), in January 1945, the Germans murdered 18 prisoners of the Auschwitz concentration camp in the village during a death march.

In March 2025 a local wayside shrine, dating from the 19th century, was restored by an anonymous person who repainted its reliefs and added a translation of the pre-existing German inscription.

== Transport ==
The Voivodeship road 933 runs through the village, and the National road 81 runs nearby, west of the village.
