= Battle of Pszczyna =

1939 battle of the Invasion of Poland

Coordinates: 49°59′00″N 18°58′42″E

- Part of Invasion of Poland
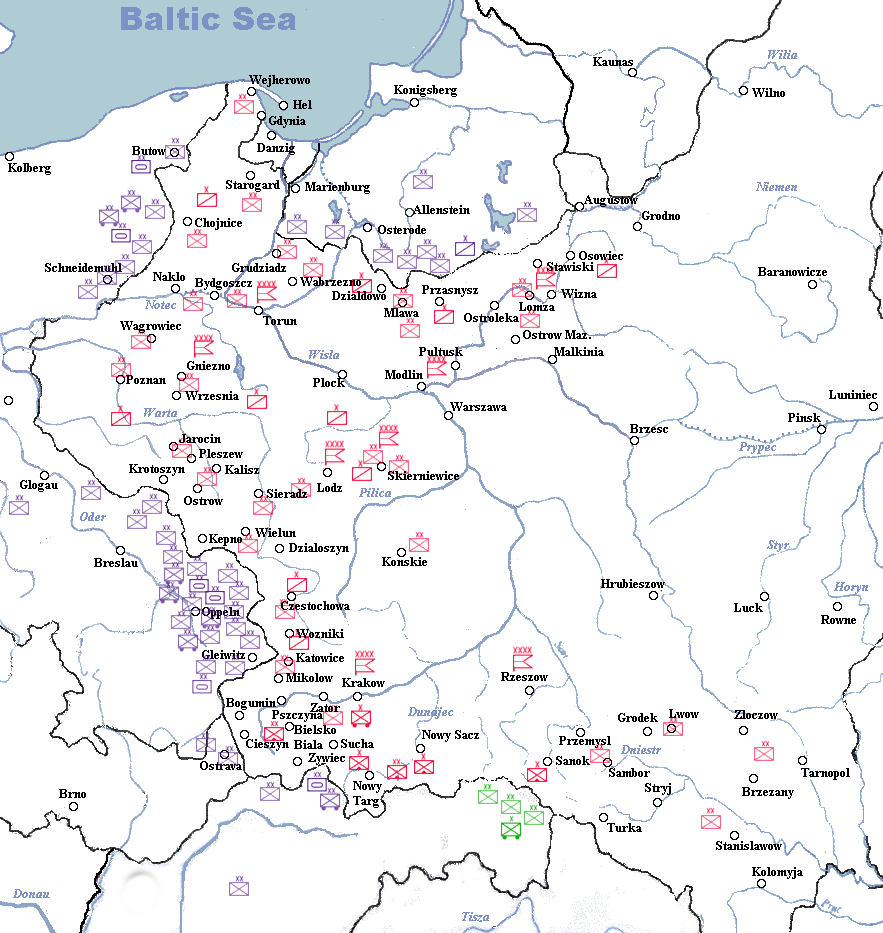
- Polish and German deployment on September 1, 1939
Date	September 1–2, 1939
Location	Near Pszczyna, Silesian Voivodeship, Poland
Result	German victory

Belligerents
Germany	Poland

Commanders and leaders
(Nazi Germany) Heinrich von Vietinghoff (Nazi Germany) Obst. Haarde (WIA) (Nazi Germany) Obst. Streich (Nazi Germany) Obst. Lubbe (commander of column "A" after Haarde)	(Second Polish Republic) Bernard Mond (Second Polish Republic) Ignacy Misiąg

Strength
5th Panzer Division; 335 tanks Waffen SS motorized regiment "Germania"	6th Infantry Division

Casualties and losses
Unknown human losses 98+ tanks and AFVs; 1 recon plane	441+ killed 7+ cars 2 tankettes 33 – 34 cannons 11 anti-tank guns

Battle of Pszczyna (Polish: Bitwa Pszczyńska) refers to a series of battles between 1 and 2 September 1939 near the town of Pszczyna during the Invasion of Poland. The battle of Pszczyna formed part of the defensive Battle of the Border. The initial, decisive victory of the Polish forces on September 1, 1939 was followed by the crushing defeat on the next day near Ćwiklice, due to a major tactical error on the part of the Polish military command, resulting in premature withdrawal of the entire Armia Kraków from Upper Silesia.

== Background ==
The battle was fought along the defense belt 20 kilometres (12 mi) wide and 70 kilometres (43 mi) long, from the west extending to the Polish-German border, and from the east to the rivers Przemsza and Soła. The Rybnicki and Kobiorski forests constituted the north-side perimeter of the battlefield, and to the south, the Vistula river along with the right tributary of Odra, the Piotrówka river provided natural protection. The defensive line some 22 kilometers in length was built by Poland already in 1929–33, as part of the strategic plan for securing the national border around the Central Industrial Region. The fortifications erected at the cost of zl 300,000, included concrete shelters manned by the Silesian 23rd Infantry Division. In 1936–37 two new bridges were built over the Vistula and the Chochułka rivers near Goczałkowice and Pszczyna for military transport, and the supply roads were paved with asphalt in late 1930s. Overall, the defense line seemed sufficient at the time to stop a successful panzer attack. The tactical mistake of the Polish command was the assumption that the attack of the German 5th Panzer Division would require the support of infantry to secure its rear.

== Overview ==
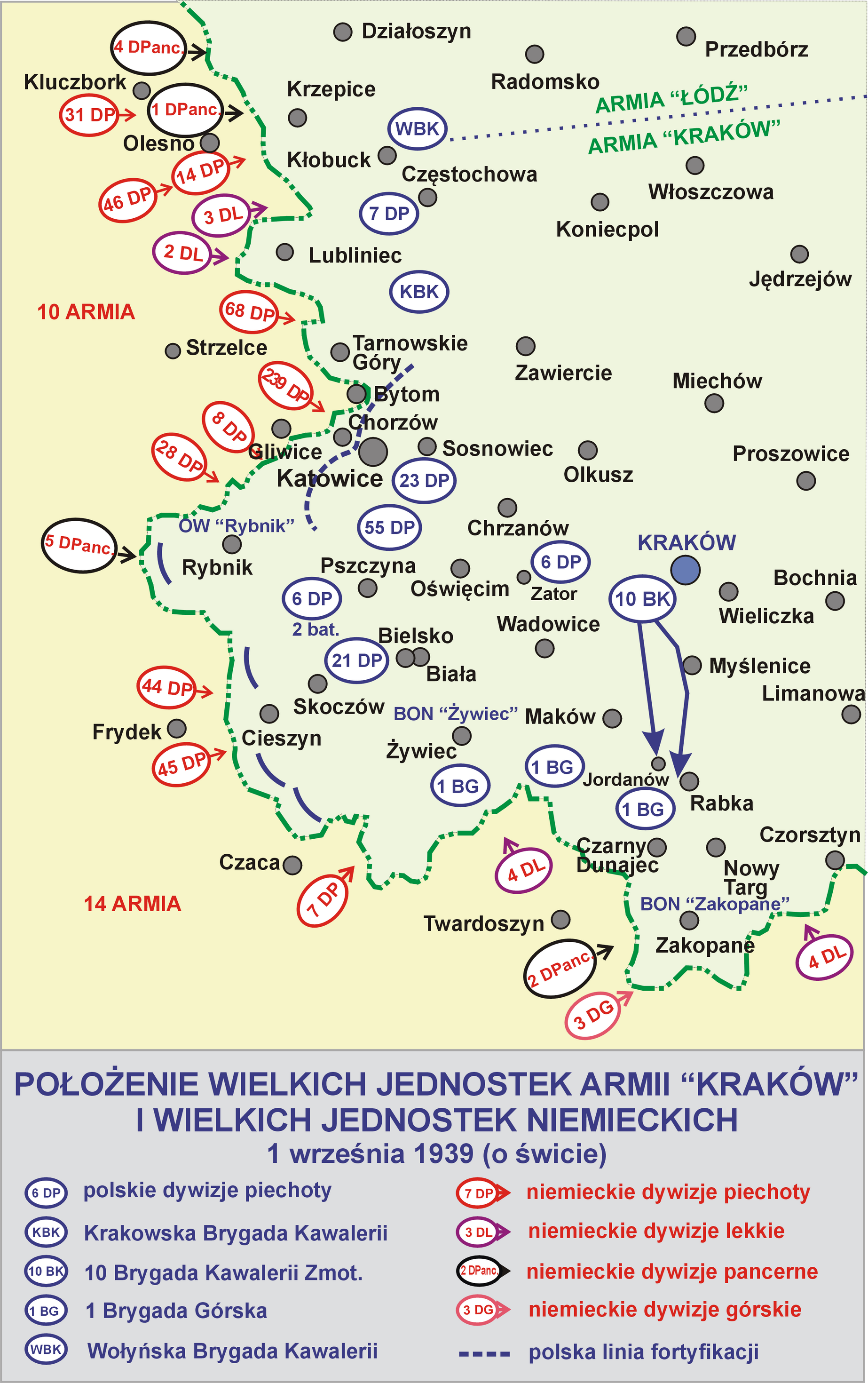
Positions of Polish and German forces before the battle. Map by Lonio17

The battle can be divided into four phases:

- 1 September: successful Polish defense of the outer positions near the Brzeźce and Wisła Wielka villages.
- 2 September, morning: Polish defense of the main positions near Pszczyna.
- 2 September, afternoon: battles near Ćwiklice.
- 3 September - 4 September: Polish successful separation and withdrawal, however they paid dearly (Polish withdrawal was successful mainly thanks to a diversionary counterattack on Ćwiklice made by two battalions from the 16th infantry regiment which gave time for other units to regroup and withdraw).

During the second day of the battle Polish forces suffered a defeat and were forced to retreat. The main reason of their defeat (apart from huge German material and numerical superiority) was that the Polish commanders incorrectly predicted the direction of the main German attack on 2 September. As the result, the whole Polish plan of defense failed, because then it became impossible to activate a huge trap, which was prepared for German tanks, called the "big bag" trap, which was weak in front, but strong on its sides - with strong artillery assisting in attacking targets which entered the 'bag'. Also, overmuch certainty after great successes of the previous day (especially fierce, few hours-long combat - with use of the "big bag" trap - near Brzeźce village) contributed to Polish defeat.

Because of their certainty, Polish commanders decided to make "the big bag trap" more shallow - which meant that it was less flexible, and Polish positions would be easier to crush if the defense was not successful (as it happened) - but on the other hand - if the defense was successful (which didn't happen since the unexpected direction and strength of the German main attack were deadly), the shallow "bag" would be more effective because the German attack would be stopped faster and with greater casualties for the enemy due to a greater concentration of firepower.

The defeat suffered at Pszczyna (which also caused a loss of a significant percent of divisional artillery) forced the Polish High Command to pull back the entire frontline, and cede the territory of Upper Silesia to the Germans.

German equipment losses and Polish equipment losses and casualties (list may be incomplete)

On 1 September 1939
Place	German casualties	Polish casualties	Polish dead
Rybnik	7 tanks	7+ cars	16+ dead
Rydułtowy	none	none	2 dead
Mszana	7 armoured cars	none	none
Branica	2 tanks	none	unknown
Łąka	few tanks	unknown	unknown
Brzeźce	13 - 14 tanks and 1 tank surrendered to the Poles (with 2 soldiers) and was destroyed	1 AT gun	1 - 2 dead
Równie	4 tanks (including 1 Pz-IV)	1 75mm cannon	unknown
Żory	4 tanks	none	11 dead
Głożyny	none	none	7 dead
Wilchwy	none	none	2 dead
Wodzisław	none	none	1 dead
Boża Góra/Jastrzębie	2 tanks and 4 - 6 armoured cars	none	3 dead
Warszowice	none	none	2 dead
Kryry	3 tanks and 2 more tanks stuck in the swamps (1 later pulled out)	none	none
Wisła Wielka	4 tanks	1 75mm cannon	15 dead
Strumień	1 light tank (by Polish tankettes TK), 1 Luftwaffe recon plane shot down over Strumień	none	2 dead
Unknown place	unknown	unknown	3 dead
Total 1 September:	45 - 47+ tanks & 11 - 13+ armoured cars, 1 recon plane	2 cannons, 1 AT gun, 7 cars+	65 - 66+ dead

Between 2 and 4 September 1939
Place	German casualties	Polish casualties	Polish dead
Łąka	none	unknown (all are included in summary for the day)	27 dead
Pszczyna	5 tanks	unknown	10 dead
Ćwiklice	17 - 18+ tanks (including at least 1 Pz-IV) and 3 more got stuck in the mud (1 later pulled out, 2 captured by Poles)	unknown, but very high - including 6 batteries of light artillery & at least 3 AT guns (all included in summary for the day)	226 or 251 dead and estimated 300 - 350 wounded
Stara Wieś	3 - 8 tanks (3 for sure by mines, up to 5 by AT gun but this is doubtful)	unknown	9 - 13 dead
Jankowice	none	unknown	6 dead
Miedźna	1 tank	unknown	none
Góra	1 tank	unknown	3 dead
Goczałkowice	none	unknown	1 dead
Unknown place	unknown	unknown	unknown
Total 2 September:	30 - 36+ tanks	23 - 24 75mm cannons, 4 105mm cannons, 4 AT guns	282 - 311+ dead
Międzyrzecze	several tanks	none	unknown
Bojszowy	5 tanks	none	none
Jankowice	none	1 AT gun	2 dead
Piasek	none	none	1 dead
Unknown place	unknown	unknown	unknown
Total 3 September:	7 - 8+ tanks	1 AT gun	3+ dead
Rajsko - 4 IX	5+ tanks	5 AT guns, 4 75mm cannons	80 - 83 dead + 11 drown in the river Soła
Unknown place 4 IX	unknown	2 tankettes - non-combat losses (one was left without seeing combat because of a technical failure during withdrawal, the second was lost in the canal along with its crew)	unknown
Grand Total Battle of Pszczyna:	87 - 96+ tanks & 11 - 13+ armoured cars, 1 Luftwaffe recon plane	2 tankettes, 29 - 30 75mm cannons, 4 105mm cannons, 11 AT guns	441 - 474+ dead

Casualty list according to monograph about the battle titled Bitwa Pszczyńska 1939 ("Battle of Pszczyna 1939") by Janusz Ryt.

After the long and bloody combat at Ćwiklice on 2 September 1939, German war correspondent K. Frowein wrote after seeing one of the Polish infantrymen heavily wounded:

This was the first Polish soldier I have ever seen. Bloody piece of human suffering. Legs pulled up to his chest because of pain, face – greenish-pale. From his thin lips almost inaudible scream was getting out – "Water! Water!". We unbuttoned his uniform jacket – smeared with blood and entrails. German orderly gave him canteen with water. For the last time a smile appeared on his face, when he whispered: "Danke". A few minutes later he died. Now he rests in peace where he fell, under a straight, wooden cross, decorated with Polish helmet and a plate with inscription: "Six Polish soldiers". This Polish infantryman died like a real soldier. Until the end he was defending his post, completing his orders. When deadly bullets reached him, his munition holds were empty, and in the magazine of his rifle there were only 2 bullets. — War correspondent K. Frowein, 2 IX 1939.

== See also ==
- List of World War II military equipment of Poland
- List of German military equipment of World War II
