= Wisła Mała =

- Village
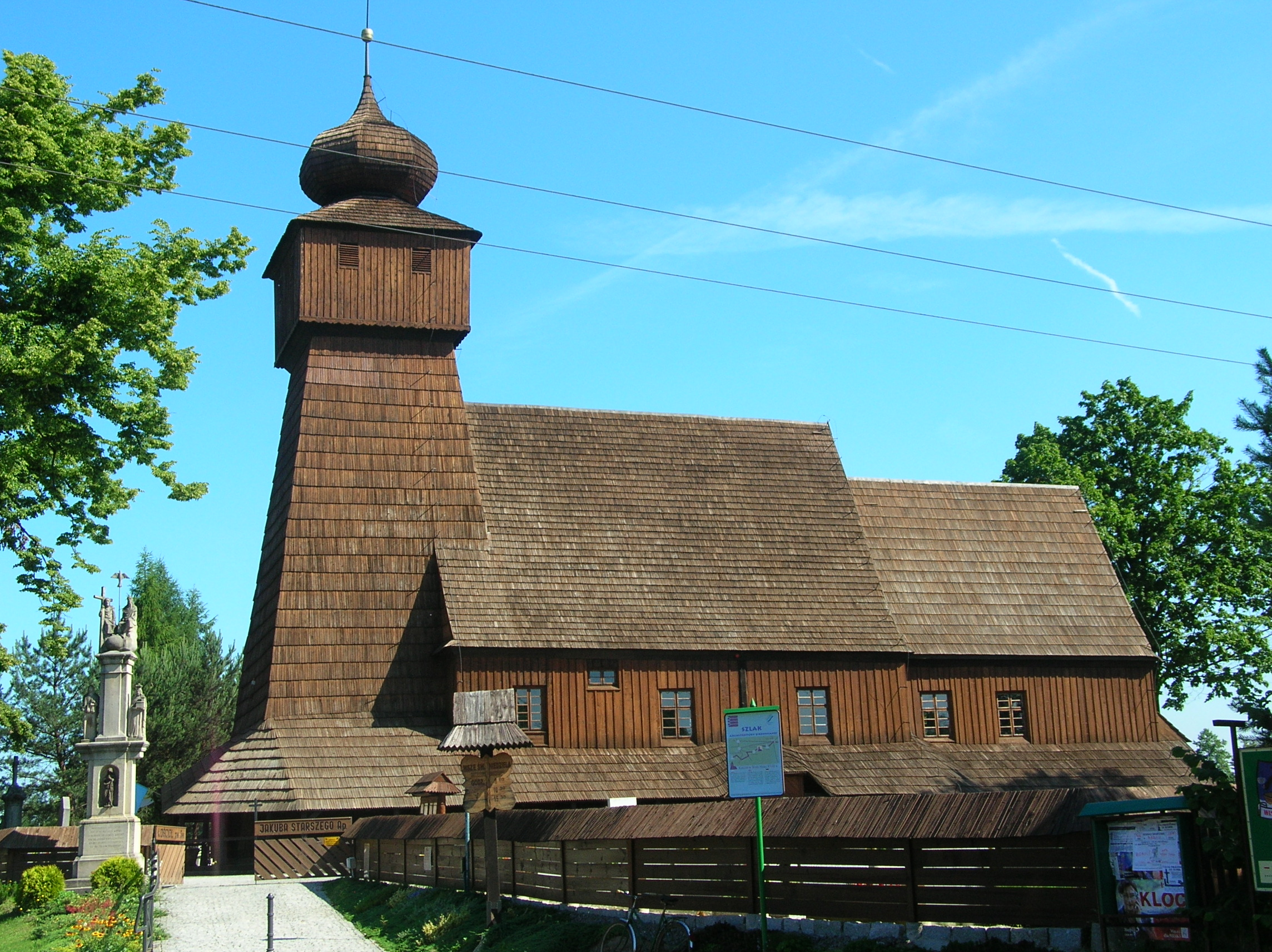
- Saint James church

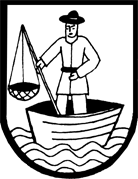
- Coat of arms

- Location within Poland
- Coordinates: 49°57′N 18°48′E
- Country: Poland
- Voivodeship: Silesian
- County: Pszczyna
- Gmina: Pszczyna
- First mentioned: 1233
- Population: 1,295
- Time zone: UTC+1 (CET)
  - Summer (DST): UTC+2 (CEST)
- Vehicle registration: SPS

Wisła Mała (Polish: [ˈviswa ˈmawa], "Little Vistula") is a village in the administrative district of Gmina Pszczyna, within Pszczyna County, Silesian Voivodeship, in southern Poland.

== History ==
In the Middle Ages, the area was part of the territory of the Vistulans tribe, one of the Polish tribes. It became part of the emerging Polish state in the 10th century. As a result of the fragmentation of Poland, it was part of the Polish Seniorate Province and Duchy of Racibórz. The village of Wisła was first mentioned in 1223 as Vizla, in a document of Bishop of Wrocław issued for Norbertine Sisters in Rybnik among villages paying them tithe. It belonged then to the Duchy of Opole and Racibórz and Castellany of Cieszyn. Later it belonged together with Wisła Wielka to the state country of Pszczyna. The adjective German differentiated it from Wisła Wielka, which most likely referred to it being established according to the so-called German Law as opposed to the old ius ducale (Polish Law).

== Transport ==
The Voivodeship road 939 runs through the village and the National road 81 runs nearby, west of the village.
