= Jankowice, Pszczyna County =

Jankowice
- Village
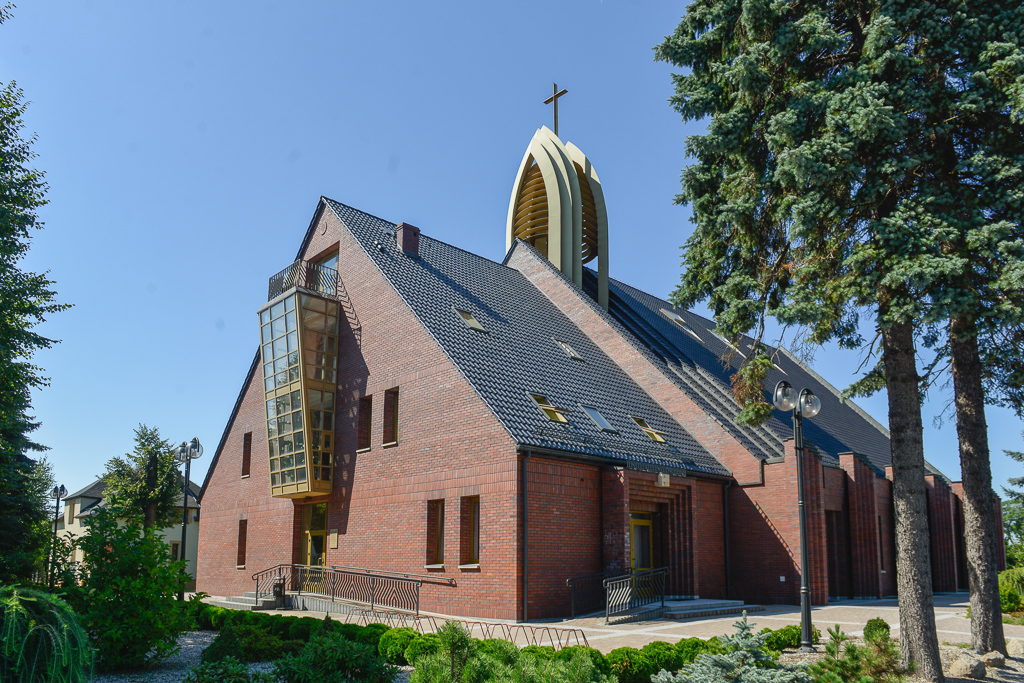
- Saint Isidore church in Jankowice

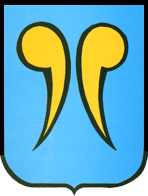
- Coat of arms

- Location within Poland
- Coordinates: 50°0′5″N 18°59′18″E
- Country: Poland
- Voivodeship: Silesian
- County: Pszczyna
- Gmina: Pszczyna
- Population: 2,697
- Time zone: UTC+1 (CET)
  - Summer (DST): UTC+2 (CEST)
- Vehicle registration: SPS

Jankowice [jankɔˈvit͡sɛ] is a village in the administrative district of Gmina Pszczyna, within Pszczyna County, Silesian Voivodeship, in southern Poland.

== History ==
The village lies in the historical region of Upper Silesia.

In the Middle Ages, the area was part of the territory of the Vistulans tribe, one of the Polish tribes. It became part of the emerging Polish state in the 10th century. As a result of the fragmentation of Poland, it was part of the Polish Seniorate Province and Duchy of Racibórz. Later on, the village passed under Bohemian (Czech) suzerainty, and in the 15th century, it became part of the newly formed Duchy of Pszczyna. During the political upheaval caused by Matthias Corvinus the duchy was overtaken in 1480 by Casimir II, Duke of Cieszyn from the Piast dynasty, who sold it in 1517 to the Hungarian magnates of the Thurzó family, forming the Pless state country. In the accompanying sales document issued on 21 February 1517, the village was mentioned as Jankowicze. Along with the Kingdom of Bohemia in 1526 it became part of the Habsburg monarchy. In the War of the Austrian Succession most of Silesia was conquered by the Kingdom of Prussia, including the village, and in 1871 it became part of the German Empire.

After World War I in the Upper Silesia plebiscite, 467 out of 505 inhabitants voted in favour of rejoining Poland, which just regained independence, compared to 38 for Germany. It later became a part of Silesian Voivodeship, Second Polish Republic. On September 3, 1939, during the German invasion of Poland which started World War II, the German Freikorps committed a massacre of 13 Poles in the village, including a family of six with four children aged 8 to 14 (see Nazi crimes against the Polish nation). The village was then occupied and annexed by Nazi Germany. After the war, in 1945, it was restored to Poland.

== Transport ==
The Voivodeship road 931 runs through the village and the National road 1 runs nearby, west of the village.

== Sports ==
The local football team is Znicz Jankowice. It competes in the lower leagues.
