= Ignacy Misiąg =

Polish officer (1891–1942)

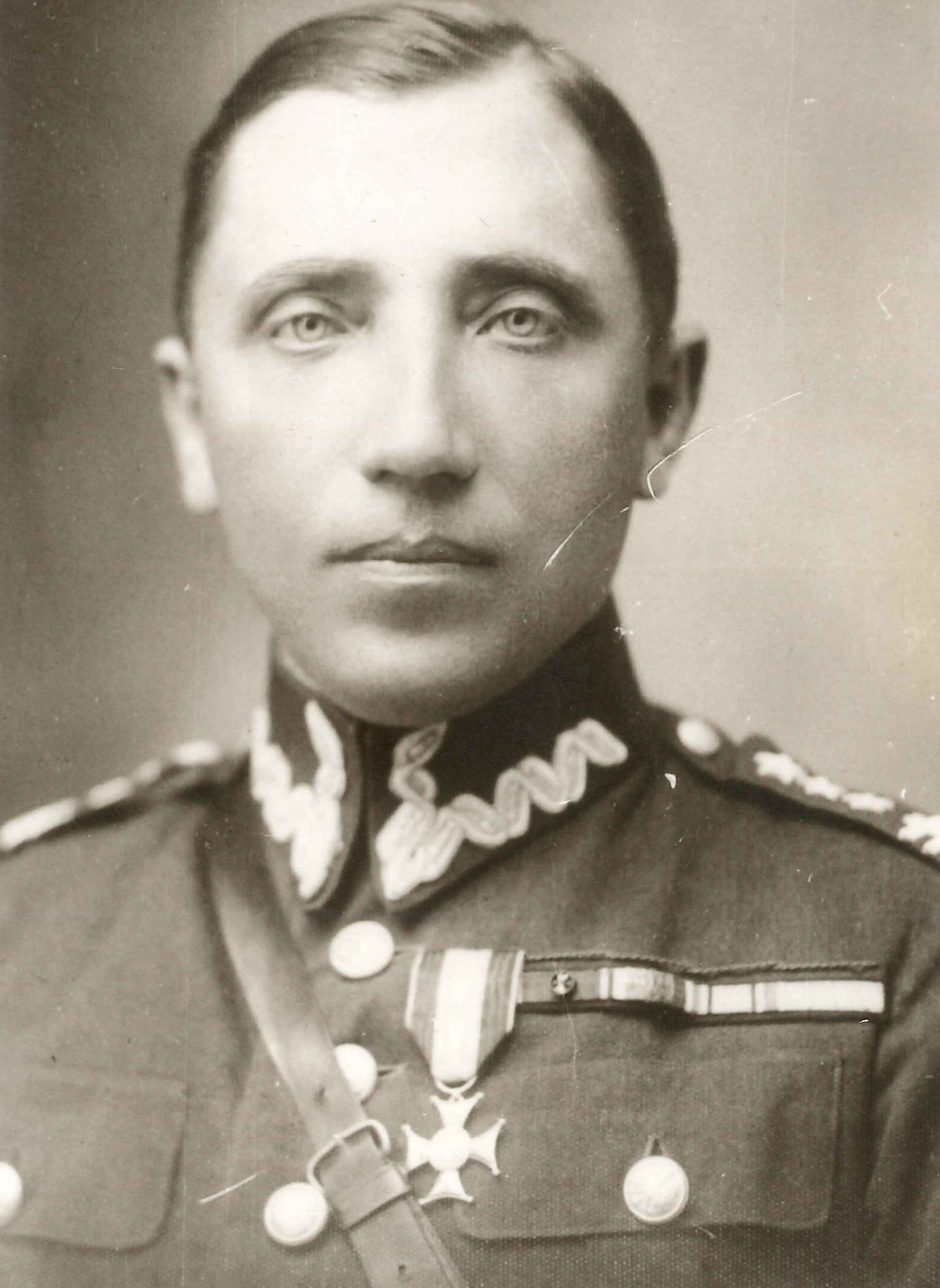
- Born: July 30, 1891; Tywonia, Kingdom of Galicia and Lodomeria, Austria-Hungary
- Died: January 24, 1942 (aged 50); Stargard, Gau Pomerania, Nazi Germany
- Burial place: War Cemetery in Stargard, Stargard, West Pomeranian Voivodeship, Poland
- Military career
- Allegiance: Austria-Hungary; Poland
- Branch: Austro-Hungarian Army; Polish Armed Forces
- Service years: 1914–1942
- Rank: Colonel
- Commands: 14th Kujavian Infantry Regiment; 6th Infantry Division
- Conflicts: World War I Polish–Ukrainian War; Polish–Soviet War; World War II: Battle of Pszczyna; Battle of Tomaszów Lubelski

Ignacy Misiąg (July 30, 1891 – January 24, 1942) was a Polish infantry colonel who was most notable for his service in World War II.

== Biography ==
=== Early years and World War I ===
Misiąg was the son of Jan Misiąg (1853–1927) and Franciszka née Krajnig who both were poor peasants. He attended a gymnasium in Jarosław, where he obtained his secondary school- leaving examination in 1910. After graduating from the gymnasium, he began law studies at the Jagiellonian University in Kraków, which he had to leave because he was drafted into the Austro-Hungarian Army. In the years 1910 to 1911 he completed a one-year volunteer military service in the independent battalion of the 90th Infantry Regiment. At that time, he was serving in Bosnia and Herzegovina. After fulfilling his military obligations, he returned to education, at the same time joining the Sports and Gymnastic Society "Strzelec".

After the outbreak of World War I, in 1914 he was mobilized into the Austro-Hungarian Army. After graduating from officer training, he was sent to the Serbian campaign as a reserve cadet. In 1915 he was promoted to the rank of second lieutenant in reserve with seniority on 1 July 1915. He fought in Montenegro and Italy where he underwent malaria. In 1918, Ignacy Misiąg was promoted to the rank of lieutenant with seniority on May 1, 1915.

=== Service in the Polish Armed Forces ===
After the end of World War I, he returned from the front to Jičín. He became the organizer and the first commander of the 14th Kujavian Infantry Regiment, because at the turn of October and November 1918 he took command of the reserve battalion of the 90th Infantry Regiment, most of which consisted of Poles. On the basis of this battalion, he created a unit called the 9th Infantry Regiment. After the 9th infantry regiment was transported to Jarosław, Lieutenant Misiąg became actively involved in organizing the units of the Polish Armed Forces. In February 1919, the 9th Infantry Regiment was renamed the 14th infantry regiment, and on February 17, 1919, Ignacy Misiąg became adjutant to the commander of this regiment. At that time, on the basis of the decree of December 27, 1918 of the Commander-in-Chief Józef Piłsudski, he was admitted as a former Austro-Hungarian army officer to the Polish Armed Forces. In turn, on the basis of order No. 178 issued by the Chief of the General Staff Maj. Gen. Stanisław Szeptycki, on November 1, 1918, he was assigned (with the rank of lieutenant) to the Przemyśl Military District. In the ranks of the 14th infantry regiment he took part in the Polish-Ukrainian War as well as in the Polish-Soviet War, incl. in the offensive on the Volyn front (August 1919), the Kiev offensive, the fighting in Belarus in May 1920, the retreat in July 1920 and the counteroffensive in Eastern Lesser Poland. On July 8, 1919, he was appointed tactical adjutant of the regiment, in June 1920 he became the acting commander of the regiment, and on August 3, 1920, he took command of the 14th infantry regiment. Under the decree of the Commander-in-Chief of the Polish Army of July 15, 1920. He was approved on April 1, 1920, with the rank of major in infantry. Ignacy Misiąg was courageous, tactical and organizational, as evidenced by the award of the Silver Cross of the Virtuti Militari War Order (awarded by the decree of the Commander-in-Chief of April 13, 1921) and four times with the Cross of Valor.

On May 1, 1921, he arrived with the regiment to Włocławek and at the same time took the position of the commander of the local garrison. On June 1, 1921, he served in the 14th Infantry Regiment with the rank of major. By the decree of the Chief of State and the Commander-in-Chief of May 3, 1922 (decree L. 19400 / OV), he was verified with seniority on June 1, 1919, and 205th position in the corps of infantry officers. In 1923 he was already on the 191st place among the majors of the infantry corps and he was the officer acting as the commander of the 14th infantry regiment. On October 28, 1923, in Włocławek, he received a banner from the President of the Republic of Poland, funded for 14 pp by the city's society. On the basis of the regulation of March 31, 1924, issued by the President of the Republic of Poland, Stanisław Wojciechowski, he was promoted to the rank of lieutenant colonel, with seniority on July 1, 1923, and 82nd position in the corps of infantry officers. In 1924, Ignacy Misiąg was still the commander of 14th Infantry Division and at that time he was 83rd among infantry colonels in his seniority. In the same year, he also held the position of the president of the Military Sports Club of the 14th "Zagoń" infantry regiment. By order of the Minister of Military Affairs, published on January 20, 1928, he was officially transferred on February 3, 1928, to the 3rd unification three-month course for regimental commanders at the Experimental Training Center in Rembertów. In 1928, as the commander of the 14th Infantry Division, he was ranked 55 among the infantry lieutenant colonels of his seniority.

During his stay in Włocławek, he turned out to be an excellent administrator and organizer of social life. The period of command of the 14th Infantry Regiment by Ignacy Misiąg was the heyday of the Włocławek garrison. The barracks facilities were renovated, expanded and electrified, a residential house for non-commissioned officers was built, and the regiment achieved a high level of training. Lieutenant-colonel (and then colonel) Misiąg put a special effort into the development of physical culture in the city. He was a member of the Municipal Committee of Physical Education and Military Training, and from 1932 he was the president of the "Cuiavia" sports club, in which many new sections were created under his rule. He fought illiteracy among soldiers by organizing courses completed by over four thousand soldiers. He was active in the scouting in Włocławek from 1922 and in the Airborne and Antigas Defence League. During the period of high unemployment in Włocławek (1931–1932), on his order, the army distributed food and fuel to those in need, and distributed free meals to children and adolescents.

By order of the President of the Republic, Ignacy Mościcki, he was promoted to the rank of colonel, with seniority on January 1, 1929, and 18th place in the corps of infantry officers. On November 27, 1929, President Mościcki awarded Col. Misiąg, Officer's Cross of the Order of Polonia Restituta for merits in the field of organization, administration and training of the army. In 1930, he was placed 105th overall on the seniority list of infantry colonels while still being 18th in his seniority. At that time, he was still the commander of the 14th infantry regiment. Also in 1932, as the commander of 14 infantry regiment, he was ranked 18 among the colonels of the infantry corps in his seniority.

On June 20, 1933, he was appointed by the minister of military affairs to the position of the head of the Personnel Office of the Ministry of Military Affairs and received a commemorative saber with a golden head as a farewell from the authorities and residents of Włocławek) While remaining in this position, as of July 1, 1933, he was ranked 83 in total among infantry colonels while he was 17th place in seniority. In turn, on June 5, 1935, it was already 67th among all colonels of the infantry corps (and at the same time 16th in its seniority). By order of March 19, 1937, he was awarded by the President of the Republic of Poland with the Commander's Cross of the Order of Polonia Restituta, with exceptional merits in military service. Colonel Ignacy Misiąg was also decorated by Ignacy Mościcki with the Cross of Independence (in 1933) and the Golden Cross of Merit in 1935.

In February 1938 he took the position of the infantry commander of the 6th Infantry Division (the division headquarters was in Kraków). As of March 23, 1939, he was in the 13th place among the colonels of the infantry corps in his seniority and still served as the 1st division commander of the 6th Infantry Division.

=== World War II ===
In July 1939 he became the commander of the "Ignacy" Detached Unit and at its head took part in the September Campaign. The task of OW "Ignacy" (otherwise known as "Brzeźce") was to cover the direction of Pszczyna . On September 1 and 2, the group of Col. Misiąga fought fierce battles with the German 5th Panzer Division, as a result of which, despite its initial success, it was defeated near Pszczyna. Further fights were conducted by Colonel Misiąg together with the 6th Infantry Division (as part of the "Bielsko" Operational Group ) in Silesia, on the Dunajec, on the San, in the Biłgoraj forests and in the first Battle of Tomaszów Lubelski. On September 20, 1939, after the surrender of the 6th Infantry Division in the area of Rawa Ruska, he was taken prisoner by the Germans.

=== Captivity and Death ===
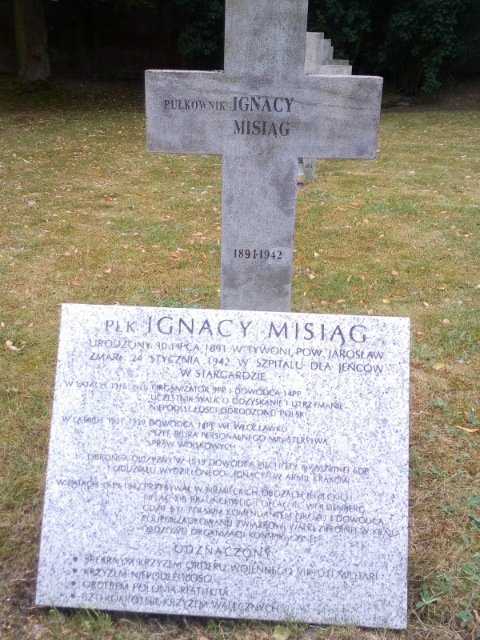
The grave of Col. Ignacy Misiąg with a commemorative plaque

Initially, he stayed in the camp in Bochnia, and then in Oflag XI B Braunschweig, where he was in the senior camp. In April 1940 was transferred to Oflag II C Woldenberg, where he also took over the duties of the camp elder. He was in charge of the camp's underground organization, but in December 1941, due to his health condition, resigned from this function.

Severely ill with Buerger's disease, he was placed in the POW hospital in Stargard, where both his legs were amputated. Nevertheless, the disease spread and he died in hospital on January 24, 1942. After his death, an academy was held in the oflag, and as a sign of mourning, all camp events were suspended for two days. He was buried at the International War Cemetery in Stargard.

For his participation in the defensive war of 1939, he was posthumously awarded the Gold Cross of the Virtuti Militari in 1967.

=== Family ===
Ignacy Misiąg was married to Maria Średnicka, with whom they had two sons: Marian Ignacy (born June 19, 1922) [n] and Jan Kazimierz (born March 4, 1926) and a daughter, Zofia Wanda (born January 22, 1926). 1925). All children were born in Włocławek.

== Awards ==
- Virtuti Militari, Gold Cross (1967)
- Virtuti Militari, Silver Cross (1921)
- Cross of Independence (December 19, 1933)
- Order of Polonia Restituta, Commander's Cross (March 19, 1937)
- Order of Polonia Restituta, Officer's Cross (1929)
- Cross of Valour (Awarded four times)
- Cross of Merit (March 19, 1935)
- Commemorative Medal for the War of 1918-1921
- Medal of the Decade of Regained Independence

== Bibliography ==
- Władysław Steblik: The "Kraków" Army 1939 . Warsaw: MON Publishing House, 1975
- Bogusław Rusztecki, Col. Ignacy Misiąg, Polish Armed Forces.
- "Portrait photo of Col. Ignacy Misiąg". NAC collections on-line.
- "The ceremony of blessing the boarding school at the Gimnazjum im. Jan Długosz in Włocławek (Colonel Ignacy Misiąg is sitting second from the right)". NAC collections on-line. 1930-10-04.
