= Kobiór =

- Village
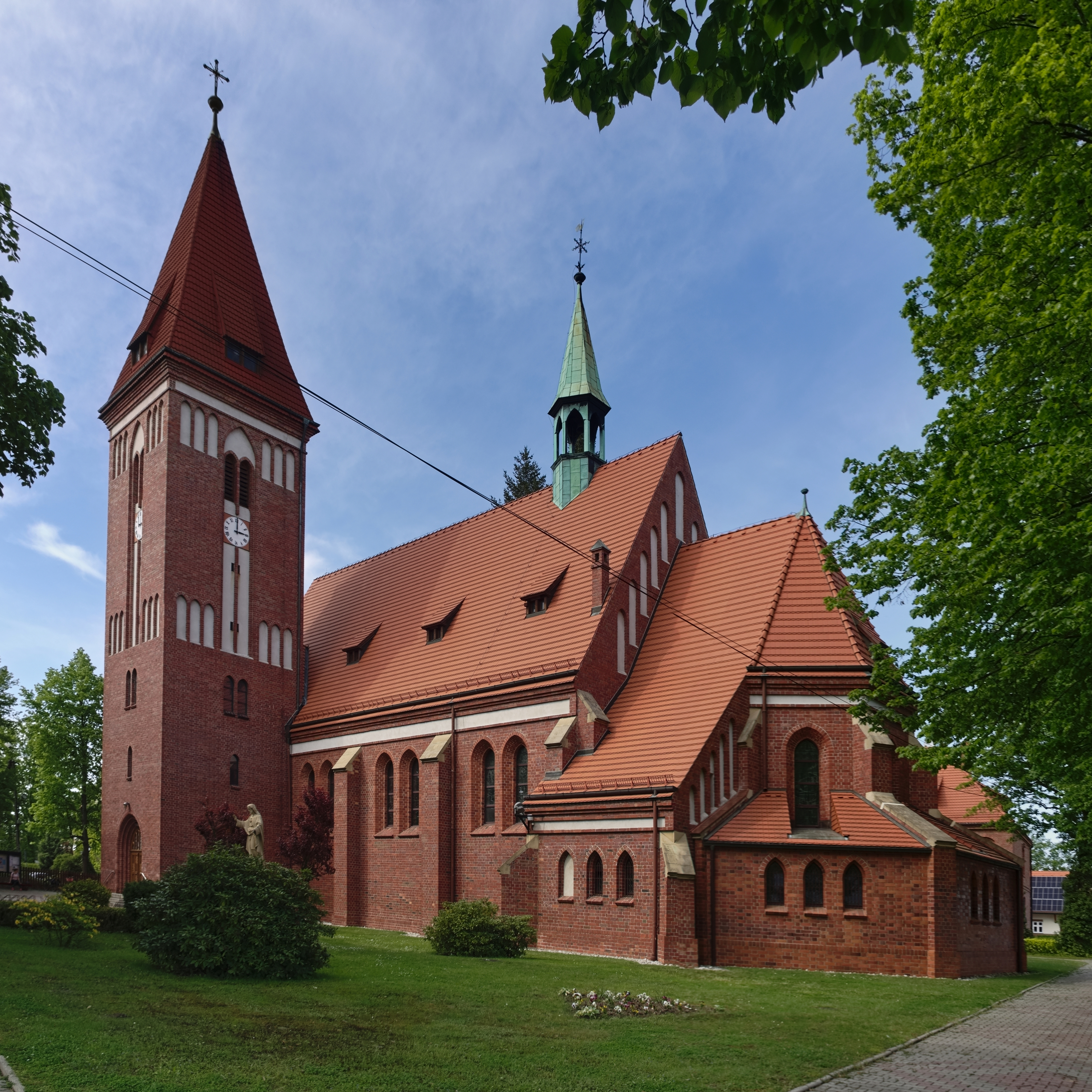
- Catholic church in Kobiór

- Coat of arms

- Location within Poland Location within Silesian Voivodeship
- Coordinates: 50°3′37″N 18°56′22″E
- Country: Poland
- Voivodeship: Silesian
- County: Pszczyna
- Gmina: Kobiór
- Population: 4,702
- Time zone: UTC+1 (CET)
  - Summer (DST): UTC+2 (CEST)
- Vehicle registration: SPS
- Website: http://www.forum.kobior.com/

Kobiór [ˈkɔbjur] (Silesian: Kobierz) is a village in Pszczyna County, Silesian Voivodeship, in southern Poland. It is the seat of the gmina (administrative district) called Gmina Kobiór. It lies approximately 9 kilometres (6 mi) north of Pszczyna and 22 km (14 mi) south of the regional capital Katowice.

== History ==
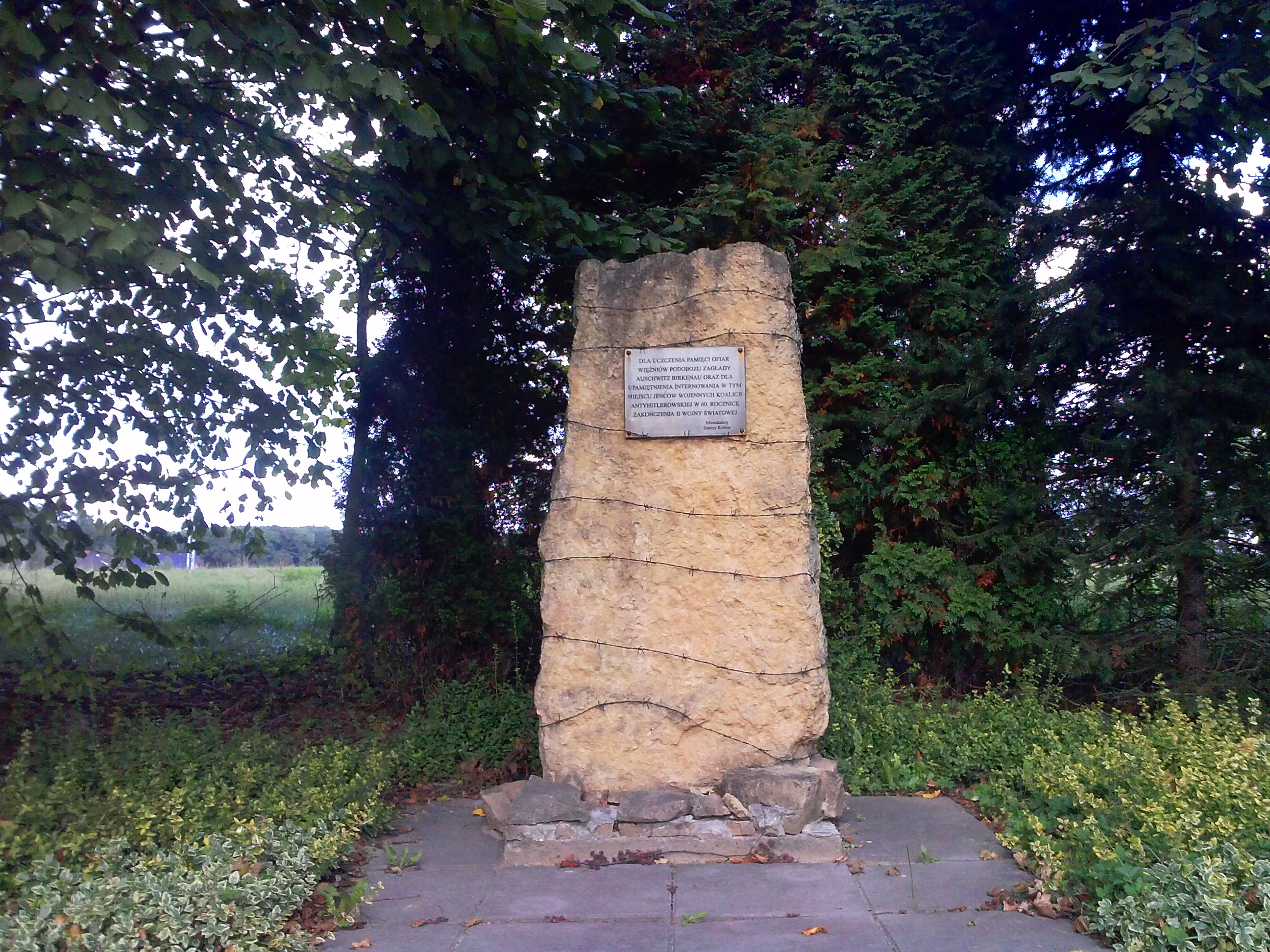
Memorial to prisoners of local subcamps of the Stalag VIII-B/344 and Auschwitz camps from World War II

In the Middle Ages, the area was part of the territory of the Vistulans tribe, one of the Polish tribes. It became part of the emerging Polish state in the 10th century. As a result of the fragmentation of Poland, it was part of the Polish Seniorate Province and Duchy of Racibórz. The village was established in the 15th century. Its name is of Polish origin.

In the 15th century, it became part of the newly formed Duchy of Pszczyna. During the political upheaval caused by Matthias Corvinus the duchy was overtaken in 1480 by Casimir II, Duke of Cieszyn from the Piast dynasty, who sold it in 1517 to the Hungarian magnates of the Thurzó family, forming the Pless state country. In the accompanying sales document issued on 21 February 1517 the village was mentioned as Kobyer. Along with the Kingdom of Bohemia in 1526 it became part of the Habsburg monarchy. In the War of the Austrian Succession most of Silesia was conquered by the Kingdom of Prussia, including the village, and in 1871 it became part of the German Empire. After World War I, Poland regained independence, and following the subsequent Polish Silesian Uprisings against Germany, the village was reintegrated with the reborn Polish state.

During the German occupation (World War II), the occupiers established and operated the E740 forced labour subcamp of the Stalag VIII-B/344 prisoner-of-war camp, and a subcamp of the Auschwitz concentration camp in the village.

== Sports ==
The local football team is Leśnik Kobiór. It competes in the lower leagues.
