= Brzeźce =

- Village
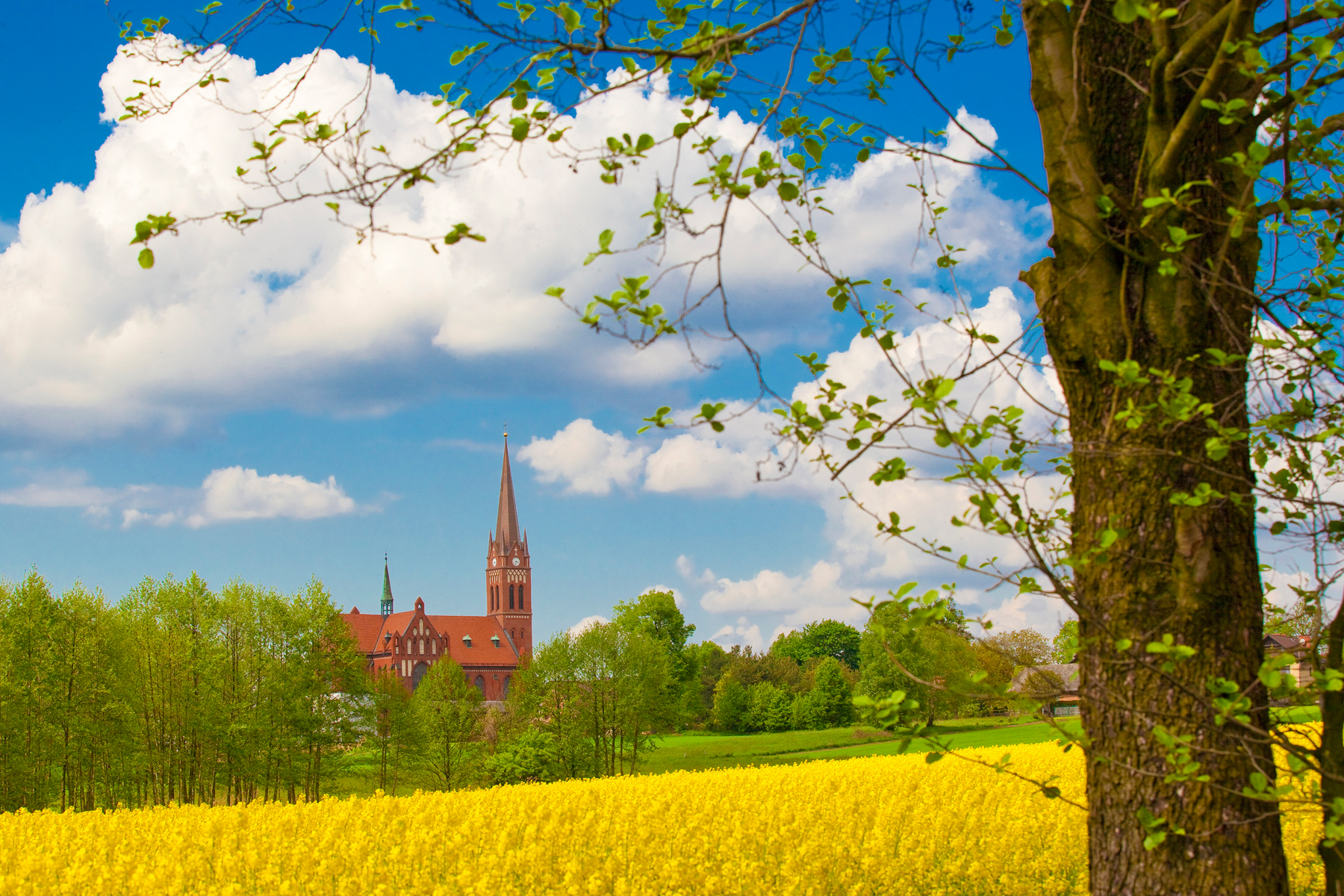
- View of Brzeźce with the Our Lady of Scapular church

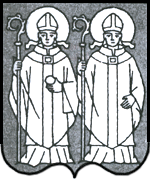
- Coat of arms

- Location within Poland
- Coordinates: 49°58′N 18°49′E
- Country: Poland
- Voivodeship: Silesian
- County: Pszczyna
- Gmina: Pszczyna
- First mentioned: 1326
- Population: 1,041
- Time zone: UTC+1 (CET)
  - Summer (DST): UTC+2 (CEST)
- Vehicle registration: SPS
- Website: http://www.brzezce.info

Brzeźce [ˈbʐɛɕt͡sɛ] is a village in the administrative district of Gmina Pszczyna, within Pszczyna County, Silesian Voivodeship, in southern Poland.

== History ==
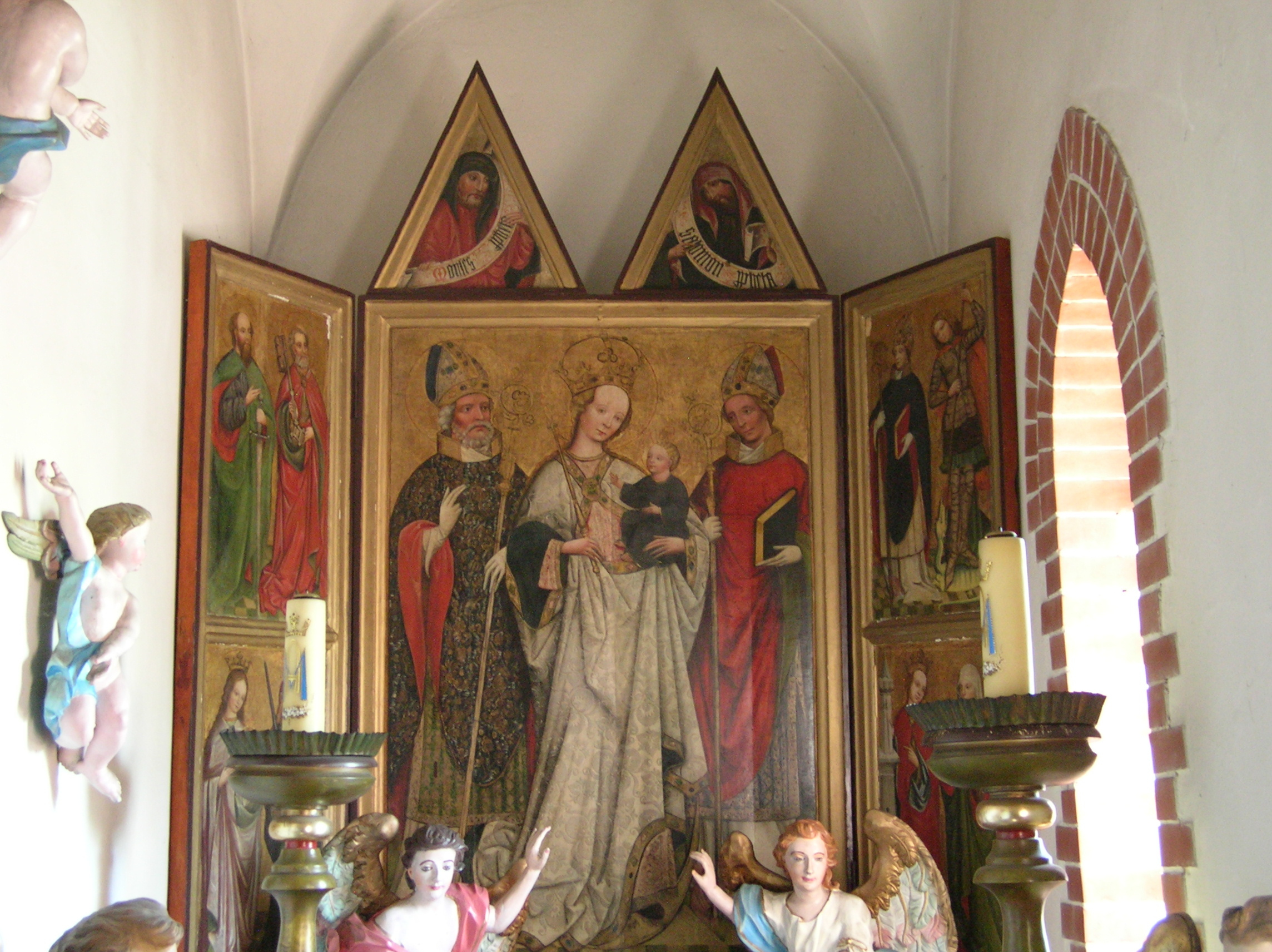
Gothic altar in the church of Our Lady of the Scapular

In the Middle Ages, the area was part of the territory of the Vistulans tribe, one of the Polish tribes. It became part of the emerging Polish state in the 10th century. The village was first mentioned in 1326 in the register of Peter's Pence payment among Catholic parishes of Oświęcim deanery of the Diocese of Kraków as Breze. It had a note that a local priest, Konrad, does not pay any taxes and is excommunicated.

Politically it belonged then to the Duchy of Racibórz, within feudally fragmented Poland, but a year later it became a fee of the Kingdom of Bohemia. During the political upheaval caused by Matthias Corvinus the land around Pszczyna was overtaken by Casimir II, Duke of Cieszyn, who sold it in 1517 to the Hungarian magnates of the Thurzó family, forming the Pless state country. In the accompanying sales document issued on 21 February 1517 the village was mentioned as Brzezcze. The Kingdom of Bohemia in 1526 became part of the Habsburg monarchy. In the War of the Austrian Succession most of Silesia was conquered by the Kingdom of Prussia, including the village.

During the German-Soviet invasion of Poland, which started World War II, the village was defended by Polish troops on September 1, 1939, and afterwards it was captured by Germany. During the German occupation, the populace was subjected to repressions, the usage of the Polish language was banned. In January 1945, the German SS murdered around 20 prisoners of the Auschwitz concentration camp in the village during a death march. In February 1945, the village was captured by the Soviets and was soon restored to Poland.

== Sports ==
The local football team is LKS Brzeźce. It competes in the lower leagues.
