= Józef Żmij =

Polish soldier and politician

Józef Żmij (1897–1972) was a Polish soldier and politician in the period before the World War II. In the World War I served in prussian Army. During the Silesian Uprisings he took part in the fights around the village of Wisła Wielka in the rank of 2nd Lieutenant. After the war, in 1930s, he became the mayor of the town of Pszczyna, where he married Filomena née Kopeć. In 1938 he was appointed by Pszczyna town court as a trustee to countess Beatrice von Hochberg, an underage daughter of Prince Hans Heinrich XV of Pless. Arrested by the Germans after the Polish Defensive War, he was imprisoned in Mauthausen-Gusen concentration camp.
