= Gmina Goczałkowice-Zdrój =

Gmina Goczałkowice-Zdrój Goczałkowice-Zdrój Commune
- Gmina
- Coat of arms
- Interactive map of Gmina Goczałkowice-Zdrój
- Coordinates (Goczałkowice-Zdrój): 49°56′14″N 18°58′57″E
- Country: Poland
- Voivodeship: Silesian
- County: Pszczyna
- Seat: Goczałkowice-Zdrój

Area
  - Total: 48.64 km^{2} (18.78 sq mi)

Population (2019-06-30)
  - Total: 6,761
  - Density: 139.0/km^{2} (360.0/sq mi)
- Website: http://goczalkowicezdroj.pl

Gmina Goczałkowice-Zdrój is a rural gmina (administrative district) in Pszczyna County, Silesian Voivodeship, in southern Poland. Its seat is the village of Goczałkowice-Zdrój, which lies approximately 6 kilometres (4 mi) south-east of Pszczyna and 35 km (22 mi) south of the regional capital Katowice.

The gmina covers an area of 48.64 square kilometres (18.8 sq mi), and as of 2019 its total population is 6,761.

== Neighbouring gminas ==
Gmina Goczałkowice-Zdrój is bordered by the gminas of Chybie, Czechowice-Dziedzice, Pszczyna and Strumień.
