= Katarzyna Szymon =

Polish mystic

Katarzyna Szymon (October 21, 1907 – August 24, 1986) was a Polish mystic, said to have stigmatic wounds.

== Life ==
She was born October 21, 1907, in Studzienice near Pszczyna. She came from a large and poor family. From the age of one, after the death of her mother, she was raised by her father and stepmother. She was a victim of domestic violence and extreme poverty. She completed three grades of elementary school and could not read or write.

Katarzyna Szymon's memoirs reveal that as a child, when her father once again kicked her out of the house, she went to a roadside cross, where she allegedly experienced an apparition. According to her account, she first heard a voice from heaven saying: "that her father would change." Her father actually converted after some time and joined the Third Order of St. Francis.

After the death of her father and stepmother, she was forced out of the family farm and had no permanent home. For a while she worked for farmers in Studzienice and Poręba, lived in Pszczyna until 1976, then in Łaziska near Turza Śląska. From 1979 to 1986 she lived in Kostuchna, Katowice on Karol Stabik Street in the home of Marta Godziek.

=== Stigmata ===
According to reports, on March 8, 1946, the first Friday of Lent, stigmatic wounds appeared in her body. She was also often said to experience visions of Jesus' passion in ecstasy. According to Marta Godziek's account, when Katarzyna Szymon's wounds opened, it was accompanied by the smell of flowers. In addition to the stigmata, she was said to have visions of the future, and claimed to communicate with the dead. She experienced visions during which, according to witnesses, she spoke languages foreign to her, such as Hebrew and Aramaic. During martial law, crowds of people gathered under the windows of the house where she lived.

=== Death ===
Katarzyna Szymon died on August 24, 1986, in Katowice, Poland. The funeral took place on August 28. She was buried in the cemetery at Holy Trinity Parish in Kostuchna. The funeral ceremony was attended by tens of thousands of people.

== Worship ==
In 1988, the Metropolitan Curia in Katowice ruled that the wounds on the visionary's body were not supernatural in nature. Despite the pleas of those she came into contact with, the beatification process has not formally begun. The apparitions have not been recognized as consistent with the teaching of the Catholic Church, and the Rev. Dr. Michał Kaszowski, in the pages of the Catholic publication "Vox Domini," calls her a false visionary.
