= Ćwiklice =

- Village
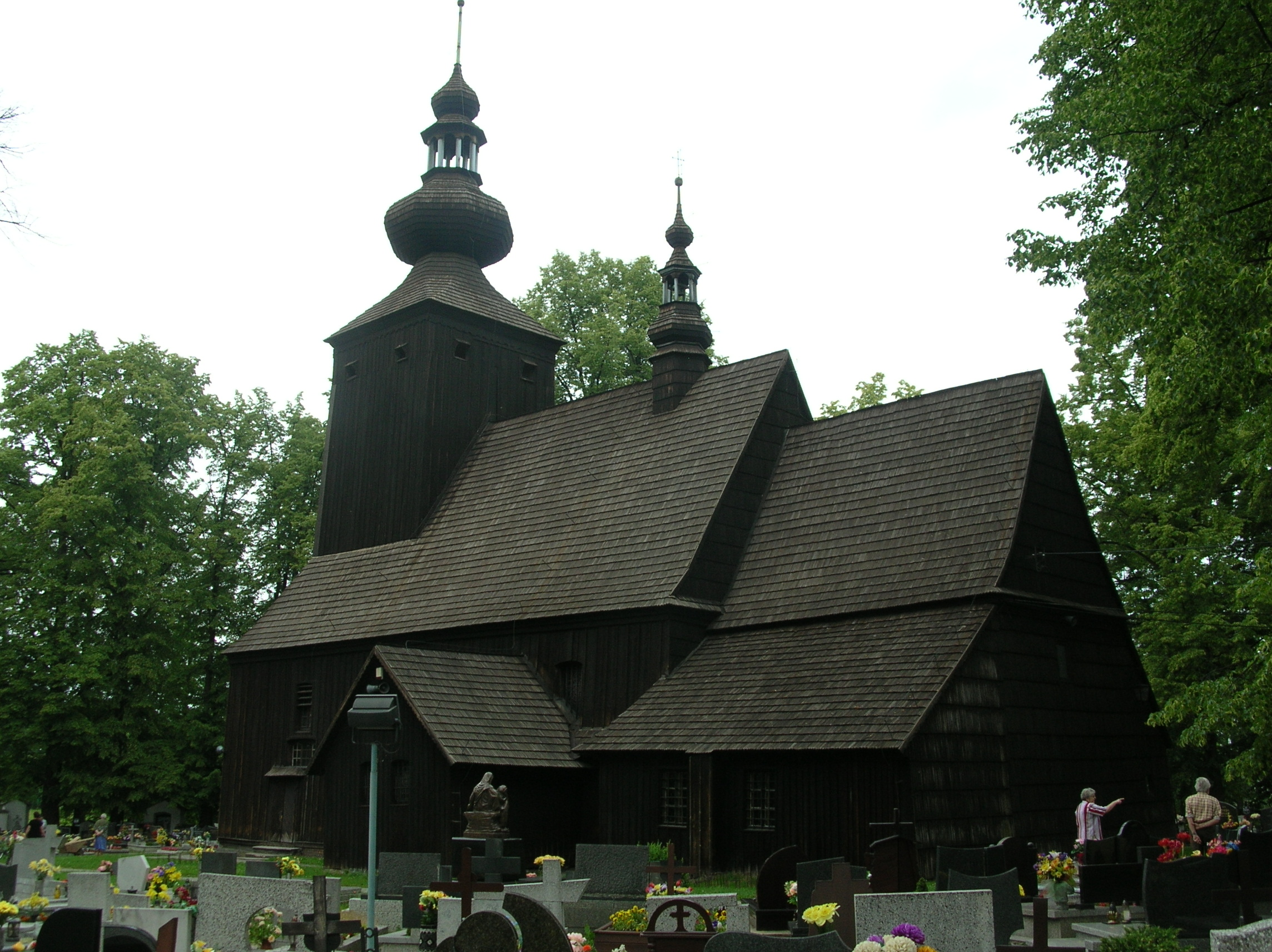
- Saint Martin church

- Location within Poland
- Coordinates: 49°59′N 18°59′E
- Country: Poland
- Voivodeship: Silesian
- County: Pszczyna
- Gmina: Pszczyna
- First mentioned: 1326
- Population: 2,400
- Time zone: UTC+1 (CET)
  - Summer (DST): UTC+2 (CEST)
- Vehicle registration: SPS
- Website: http://www.cwiklice.ehh.pl

Ćwiklice [t͡ɕfiˈklit͡sɛ] is a village in the administrative district of Gmina Pszczyna, within Pszczyna County, Silesian Voivodeship, in southern Poland.

== History ==
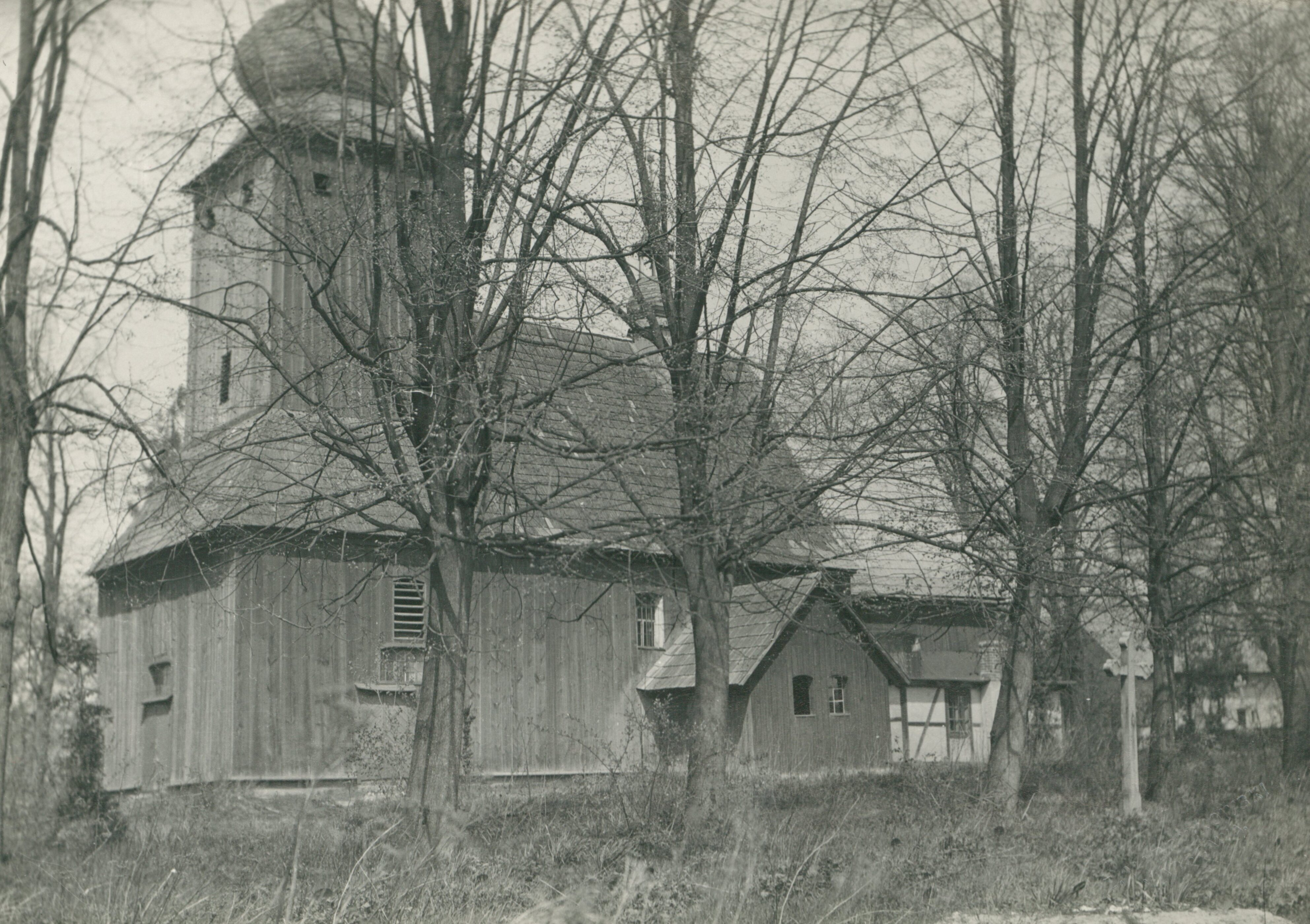
View of the church before 1930

In the Middle Ages, the area was part of the territory of the Vistulans tribe, one of the Polish tribes. It became part of the emerging Polish state in the 10th century. The village was first mentioned in 1326 in the register of Peter's Pence payment among Catholic parishes of Oświęcim deanery of the Diocese of Kraków as Cviclicz.

In September 1939, heavy fighting took place on the outskirts of the village, with the Polish 16th Infantry Regiment suffering devastating losses against German panzers, when caught in the open. During the German occupation (World War II), in January 1945, the death march from the Auschwitz concentration camp passed through Ćwiklice, and 42 prisoners (26 women and 16 men) were buried in the village.

== Transport ==
The Voivodeship road 933 runs through the village and the National road 1 runs nearby, west of the village.
