= Gmina Pszczyna =

Gmina Pszczyna Pszczyna Commune
- Gmina
- Flag Coat of arms
- Interactive map of Gmina Pszczyna
- Coordinates (Pszczyna): 49°59′N 18°57′E
- Country: Poland
- Voivodeship: Silesian
- County: Pszczyna
- Seat: Pszczyna

Area
  - Total: 174.01 km^{2} (67.19 sq mi)

Population (2019-06-30)
  - Total: 52,627
  - Density: 302.44/km^{2} (783.31/sq mi)
  - Urban: 25,823
  - Rural: 26,804
- Website: http://www.pszczyna.pl

Gmina Pszczyna is an urban-rural gmina (administrative district) in Pszczyna County, Silesian Voivodeship, in southern Poland. Its seat is the town of Pszczyna, which lies approximately 30 kilometres (19 mi) south of the regional capital Katowice.

The gmina covers an area of 174.01 square kilometres (67.2 sq mi), and as of 2019 its total population is 52,627.

== Villages ==
Apart from the town of Pszczyna, Gmina Pszczyna contains the villages and settlements of Brzeźce, Ćwiklice, Czarków, Jankowice, Łąka, Piasek, Poręba, Rudołtowice, Studzienice, Studzionka, Wisła Mała and Wisła Wielka.

== Neighbouring gminas ==
Gmina Pszczyna is bordered by the gminas of Bestwina, Bojszowy, Czechowice-Dziedzice, Goczałkowice-Zdrój, Kobiór, Miedźna, Pawłowice, Strumień and Suszec.

== Twin towns – sister cities ==
Gmina Pszczyna is twinned with:

- Bergisch Gladbach, Germany
- Holešov, Czech Republic
- Kaštela, Croatia
- Klein Rönnau, Germany
