= Gmina Kobiór =

Gmina Kobiór Kobiór Commune
- Gmina
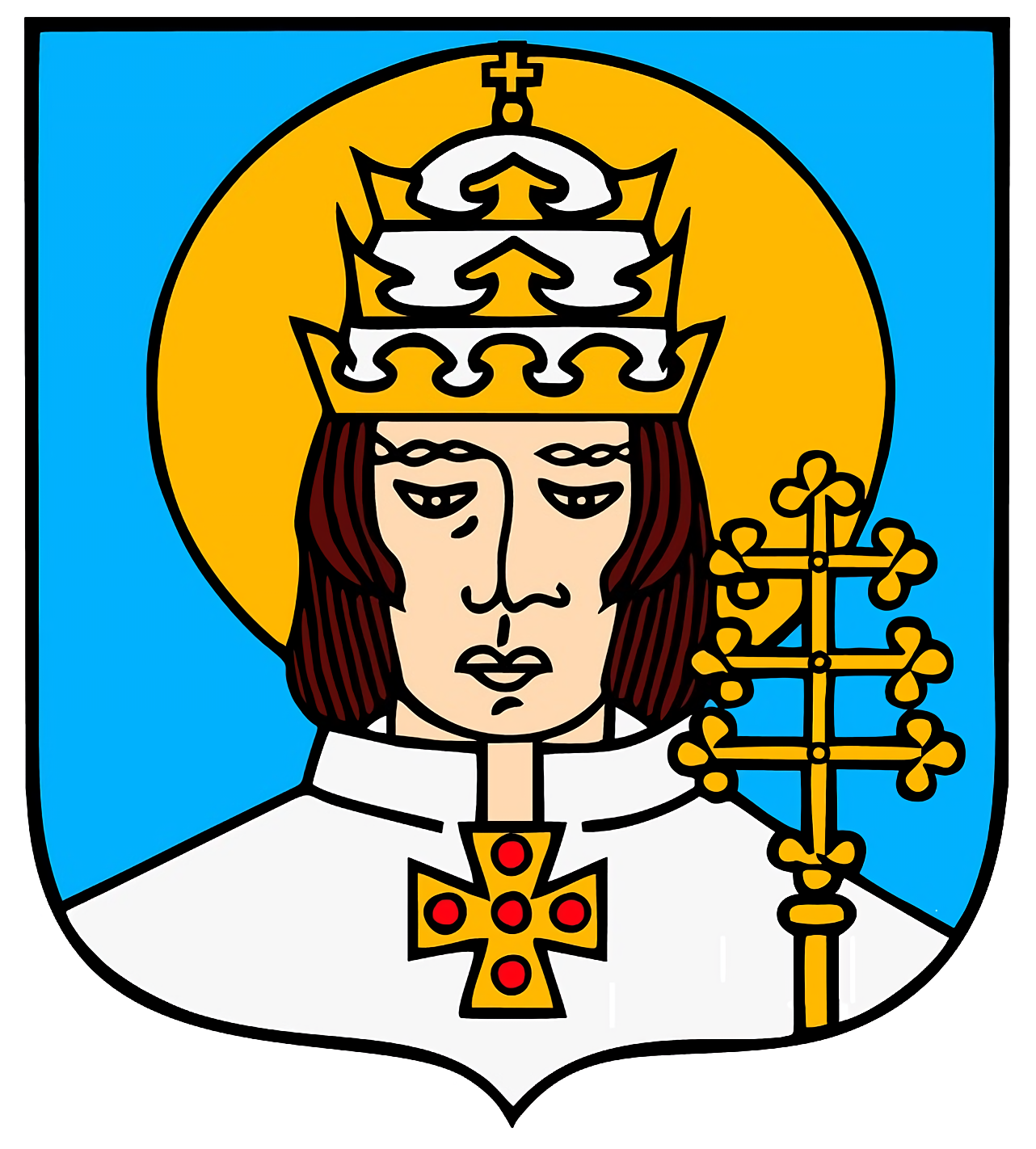
- Coat of arms
- Interactive map of Gmina Kobiór
- Coordinates (Kobiór): 50°3′37″N 18°56′22″E
- Country: Poland
- Voivodeship: Silesian
- County: Pszczyna
- Seat: Kobiór

Area
  - Total: 49.5 km^{2} (19.1 sq mi)

Population (2019-06-30)
  - Total: 4,890
  - Density: 98.8/km^{2} (256/sq mi)
- Website: http://www.kobior.pl/

Gmina Kobiór is a rural gmina (administrative district) in Pszczyna County, Silesian Voivodeship, in southern Poland. Its seat is the village of Kobiór, which lies approximately 9 kilometres (6 mi) north of Pszczyna and 22 km (14 mi) south of the regional capital Katowice.

The gmina covers an area of 49.5 square kilometres (19.1 sq mi), and as of 2019 its total population is 4,890.

== Neighbouring gminas ==
Gmina Kobiór is bordered by the towns of Orzesze and Tychy, and by the gminas of Bojszowy, Pszczyna, Suszec and Wyry.

== Twin towns – sister cities ==
Gmina Kobiór is twinned with:

- Dobšiná, Slovakia
- Sajószentpéter, Hungary
- Šternberk, Czech Republic
