= 14th Infantry Regiment (Poland) =

14th Infantry Regiment of the Land of Kujawy (Polish language: 14 Pułk Piechoty Ziemi Kujawskiej, 14 pp) was an infantry regiment of the Polish Army. It existed from 1918 until 1939. Garrisoned in Włocławek, the unit belonged to the 4th Infantry Division from Toruń.

== Beginnings ==
On October 26, 1918, in Jicin (Austrian Kingdom of Bohemia), ethnic Poles, serving in the reserve battalion of Austro-Hungarian 90th Infantry Regiment, rebelled against Austrian authorities and took control of the unit.

On October 27, 1918 in Kryvyi Rih, which was occupied by Austro-German forces, ethnic Polish soldiers of the 90th Austro-Hungarian Infantry Regiment also rebelled against their superiors, and decided to return on their own to their hometowns of Rzeszów and Jarosław. In the night of November 10/11, 1918, the soldiers clashed with the Ukrainians at the rail station of Chodorow. The battle resulted with 13 Poles KIA.

On November 6, the reserve battalion returned from Jicin to Jarosław, and soon afterwards, all battalions joined forces in a new, Polish 90th Infantry Regiment, commanded by Colonel Ignacy Misiag. At the same time, officers of the Austro-Hungarian 34th Infantry Regiment from Jarosław, decided to form 1st Infantry Regiment of the Land of Jarosław, commanded by Colonel Wiktor Jarosz-Kamionka. Facing the Polish-Ukrainian War, both units merged into the 9th Infantry Regiment. In February 1919, its name was changed into the 14th Infantry Regiment. As part of the 7th Infantry Brigade, the regiment fought in the Polish–Soviet War, after which it was moved to Zambrów. Finally, in 1921, the unit took barracks in Włocławek, remaining there until 1939.

In August 1920, the soldiers of the 14th Regiment defended Włocławek from Soviet invaders, and to commemorate this event, a monument dedicated to them was unveiled on December 15, 1923.

== 1939 Invasion of Poland ==
On August 14, 1939, the mobilization of the regiment began, and on August 26, after the oath, the soldiers marched to their positions near Golub-Dobrzyń, in the village of Debowa Laka. On September 1, the regiment clashed with the advancing Wehrmacht, covering the wing of the retreating 16th Infantry Division. Due to difficult situation of Polish units, the regiment regrouped and withdrew behind the Drweca river, near Golub-Dobrzyń.

Following a long march southwards, the regiment clashed with the enemy on September 11, near the village of Sobota. During the battle, Colonel Wlodzimierz Brayczewski, who commanded the unit was wounded. Brayczewski was replaced by Colonel Bohdan Soltys, who himself was killed during the attack on Głowno. New commandant, Major Jan Lobza, ordered the regiment to take defensive positions along the Bzura river (see Battle of Bzura).

On September 16, after several clashes with the enemy, the regiment was forced to retreat to the village of Witusza. It was then ordered to march to a forest near Brzeziny, to join other Polish units in the area. Due to enemy activity, the regiment was unable to reach the new positions, and concentrated in a forest near Stare Budy. Since the situation of Polish forces was desperate, General Władysław Bortnowski ordered all units to disperse into small groups, and try to reach Warsaw. The 14th Infantry Regiment of the Land of Kujawy ceased to exist as a cohesive unit.

== Commandants ==
- Colonel Ignacy Misiag (1918),
- Colonel Wiktor Jarosz-Kamionka (1918–1919),
- Colonel Waclaw Fara (1919),
- Major Alfred Kawecki (1920),
- Major Ignacy Misiag (1920),
- Colonel Stefan Iwanowski (1920),
- Major Ignacy Misiag (1920–1933),
- Colonel Franciszek Sudol (1933 – V 1939),
- Colonel Wladyslaw Dziobek (V – VII 1939),
- Colonel Wlodzimierz Brayczewski (VII – 11 IX 1939),
- Colonel Bohdan Soltys (11 – 12 IX 1939),
- Major Jan Lobza (13 – 18 IX 1939).

== Symbols ==
The flag, funded by the residents of Włocławek, was handed to the regiment on October 27, 1923 in Włocławek, by President Stanislaw Wojciechowski.

The badge approved in 1929, was in the shape of the Cross of Valour with the inscription 14 PP 1929, and the Polish Eagle in the middle.

== Sources ==
- Kazimierz Satora: Opowieści wrześniowych sztandarów. Warszawa: Instytut Wydawniczy Pax, 1990
- Zdzisław Jagiełło: Piechota Wojska Polskiego 1918–1939. Warszawa: Bellona, 2007

== See also ==
- 1939 Infantry Regiment (Poland)
