= Wisła Wielka =

- Village
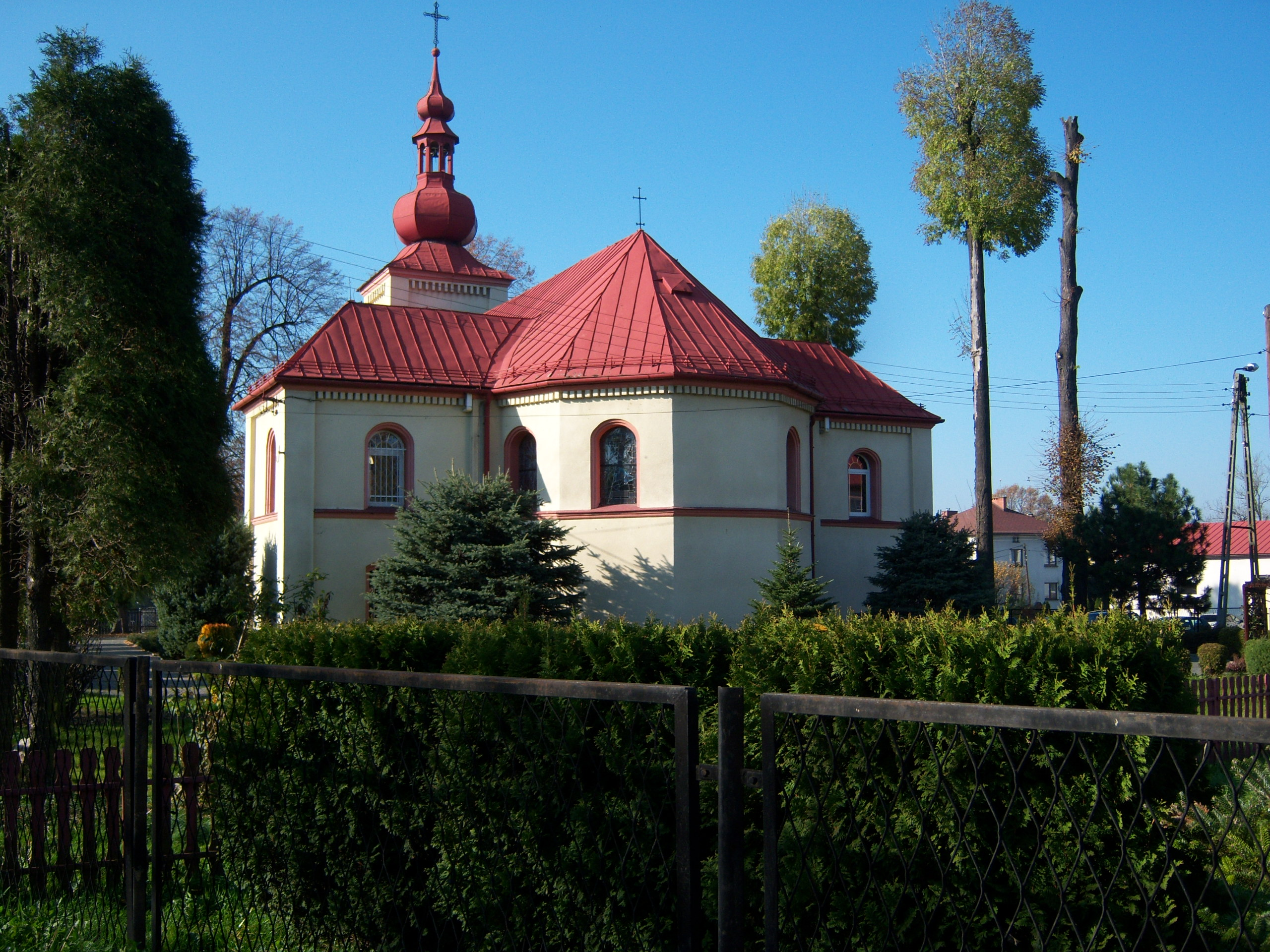
- Holy Trinity church

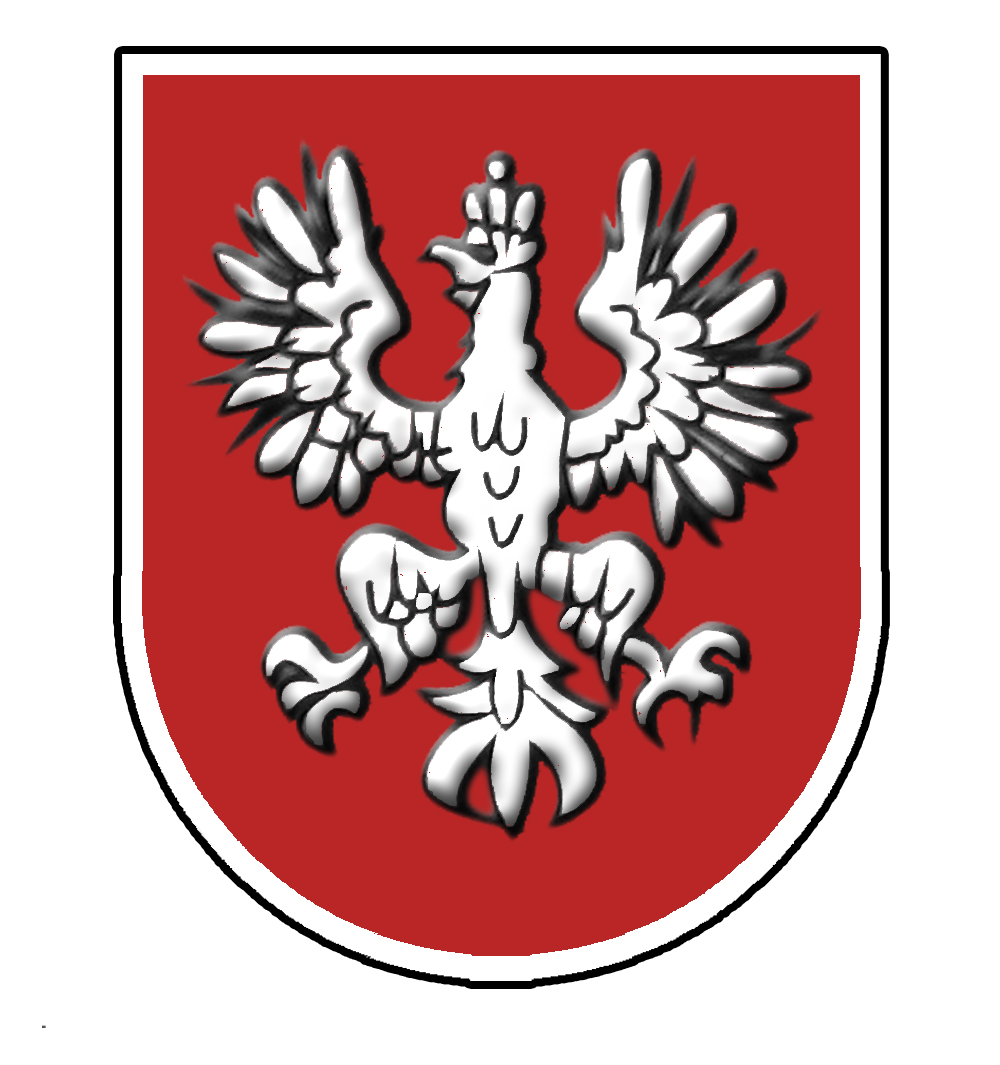
- Coat of arms

- Location within Poland
- Coordinates: 49°57′N 18°52′E
- Country: Poland
- Voivodeship: Silesian
- County: Pszczyna
- Gmina: Pszczyna
- First mentioned: 1233

Population
  - Total: 1,900
- Time zone: UTC+1 (CET)
  - Summer (DST): UTC+2 (CEST)
- Vehicle registration: SPS
- Website: http://www.wisla-wielka.pl/

Wisła Wielka (Polish: [ˈviswa ˈvjɛlka]; "Big Vistula") is a village in the administrative district of Gmina Pszczyna, within Pszczyna County, Silesian Voivodeship, in southern Poland.

== History ==
In the Middle Ages, the area was part of the territory of the Vistulans tribe, one of the Polish tribes. It became part of the emerging Polish state in the 10th century. As a result of the fragmentation of Poland, it was part of the Polish Seniorate Province and Duchy of Racibórz. The village of Wisła was first mentioned in 1223 as Vizla, in a document of Bishop of Wrocław issued for Norbertine Sisters in Rybnik among villages paying them tithe. It belonged then to the Duchy of Opole and Racibórz and Castellany of Cieszyn.

Afterwards, the village passed under Bohemian (Czech) suzerainty, and in the 15th century, it became part of the newly formed Duchy of Pszczyna. During the political upheaval caused by Matthias Corvinus the duchy was overtaken in 1480 by Casimir II, Duke of Cieszyn from the Piast dynasty, who sold it in 1517 to the Hungarian magnates of the Thurzó family, forming the Pless state country. In the accompanying sales document issued on 21 February 1517 the village was mentioned as wes Wisla Polska. Along with the Kingdom of Bohemia in 1526, it became part of the Habsburg monarchy. In the War of the Austrian Succession most of Silesia was conquered by the Kingdom of Prussia, including the village, and in 1871 it became part of the German Empire. After World War I, Poland regained independence, and following the subsequent Polish Silesian Uprisings against Germany, the village was reintegrated with the reborn Polish state.

During the invasion of Poland, which started World War II in September 1939, the village was invaded by Germany, and was one of the sites of executions of Poles carried out by German troops (see Nazi crimes against the Polish nation). The local Polish police chief was murdered by the Russians in the Katyn massacre in 1940.

== Transport ==
The Voivodeship road 939 runs through the village and the National roads 1 and 81 run nearby.

== Sports ==
The local football team is LKS Wisła Wielka. It competes in the lower leagues.
