= National road 81 (Poland) =

National road in Poland

Coordinates: 50°03′46″N 18°43′27″E

National Road 81
- Droga krajowa nr 81

Route information
- Maintained by GDDKiA
- Length: 60 km (37 mi)

Location
- Country: Poland
- Regions: Silesian Voivodeship
- Major cities: Katowice, Mikołów, Łaziska Górne, Orzesze, Żory, Skoczów

Highway system
- National roads in Poland; Voivodeship roads

National road 81 (Polish: Droga krajowa nr 81) is a route belonging to the Polish national road network. The highway connects Katowice with Skoczów, the whole stretch lies within Silesian Voivodeship.

In 1985 the numbering system was reorganized. The route from Katowice to Skoczów was numbered as DK 93 until 2000, after which it was renumbered to DK 81 (the section from Skoczów to Wisła is now DW 941).

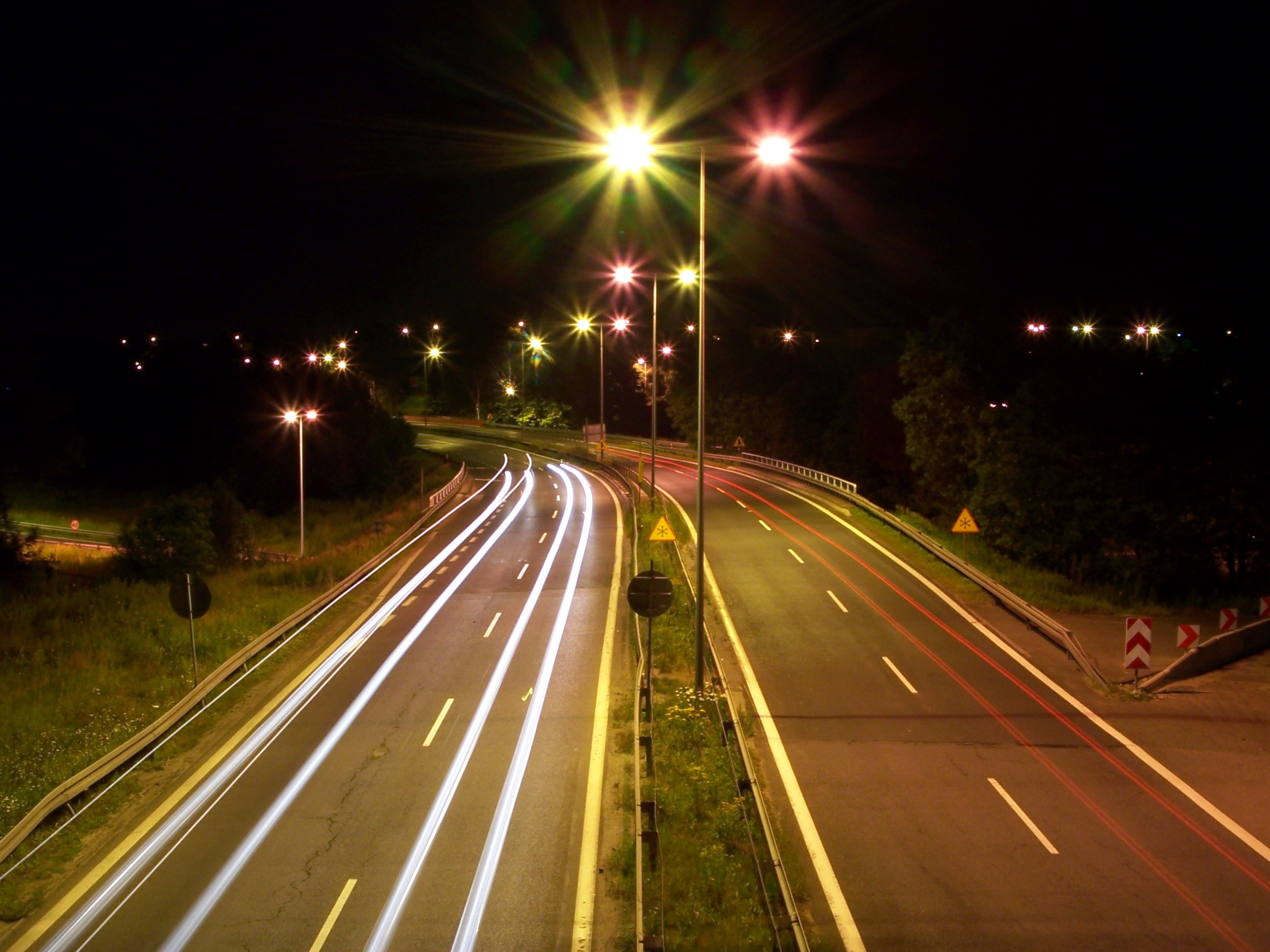
DK81 in Mikołów

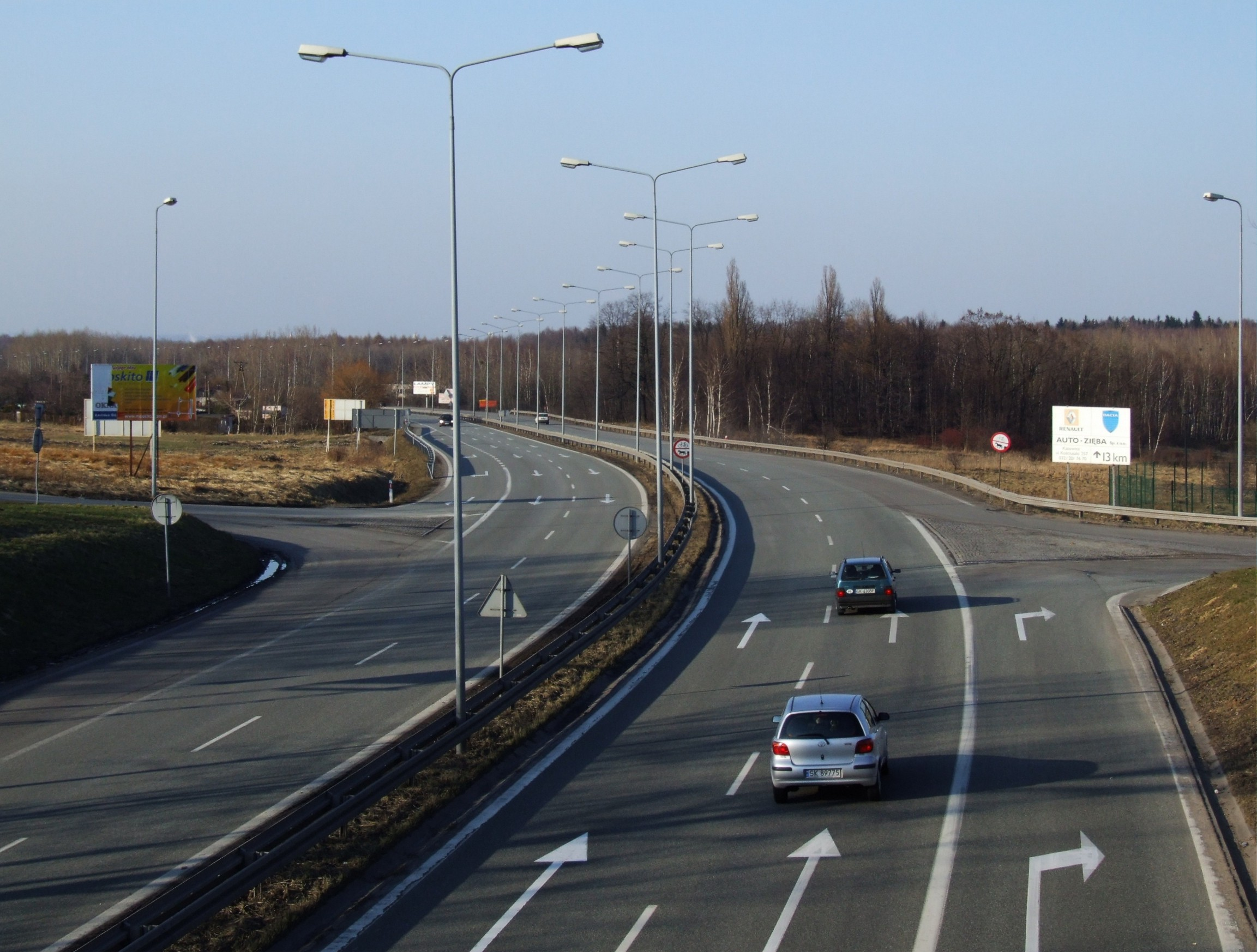
DK81 in Łaziska Górne
