= State country =

15th-18th century European territories

State country (German: Freie Standesherrschaft; Czech: stavovské panství; Polish: państwo stanowe) was a unit of administrative and territorial division in the Bohemian crown lands of Silesia and Upper Lusatia, existing from 15th to 18th centuries. These estates were exempt from feudal tenure by privilege of the Bohemian kings. Some of the state countries were highly autonomous, they had their own legal code and their lords were vassals of the king himself, not of the local dukes or princes.

== Silesia ==
The state countries were formed from former Duchies of Silesia, whose ruling dynasties - branches of the Silesian Piasts (see Dukes of Silesia) - had died out. As a ceased fief their possessions would fall to the Bohemian crown and sometimes were granted to lords of lesser nobility not affiliated with the ducal Piast family. In 1492 King Vladislas II Jagiellon of Bohemia established three state countries within the Duchy of Oleśnica (Oels), after Duke Konrad X the White had died without issue:

- Syców (Groß Wartenberg), granted to the noble Haugwitz family, acquired by Ernst Johann von Biron in 1734,
- Żmigród (Trachenberg), acquired by the House of Schaffgotsch in 1592, from 1494 together with
- Milicz (Militsch), acquired by the noble Maltzan family in 1590.

In 1502 King Vladislas II Jagiellon of Bohemia from the former Duchy of Wodzisław (Loslau) established next one state:

- Wodzisław (Loslau) granted to the noble Schallenberg family.

In 1548 Emperor Ferdinand I of Habsburg granted the former Duchy of Pszczyna (Pless) as a state country to Balthasar von Promnitz, Bishop of Wrocław, who also received the hereditary title of a Freiherr. In 1697 Emperor Leopold I of Habsburg established two more state countries:

- Bytom (Beuthen), held by the Henckel von Donnersmarck comital family
- Bytom Odrzański (Beuthen an der Oder), held by the House of Schoenaich-Carolath.

All Silesian state countries de jure existed even after the annexation by Prussia in 1742 until the end of World War I, when the Weimar Constitution of 1919 abolished all noble privileges.

In years 1571-1573 Wenceslaus III Adam, Duke of Cieszyn sold several parts of the Duchy of Cieszyn forming state countries:

- Fryštát, sold in 1572, later split into several state countries
- Bielsko, sold in 1572, later a duchy
- Skoczów with Strumień, sold in 1573, bought back into the duchy in 1594
- Frýdek, sold in 1573

== Upper Lusatia ==
The estates of Upper Lusatia:

- Muskau (Mużaków), from 1811 until 1845 held by Prince Hermann von Pückler-Muskau
- Zawidów (Seidenberg),
- Hoyerswerda and later also
- Königsbrück established in 1562

held the status of a state country under the Bohemian crown, represented in the Landtag diet, where they met the strong opposition of the Lusatian League. Together with whole Lusatia they came under the overlordship of the Saxon Electorate by the 1635 Peace of Prague: Muskau and Hoyerswerda were incorporated into the Prussian Province of Silesia according to the Final Act of the Vienna Congress in 1815.
