= Pszczyna County =

Pszczyna County Powiat pszczyński
- County
- Flag Coat of arms

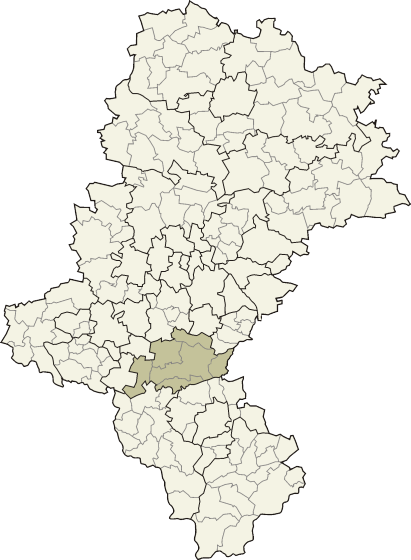
- Location within Silesian Voivodeship
- Coordinates (Pszczyna): 49°59′N 18°57′E
- Country: Poland
- Voivodeship: Silesian
- Seat: Pszczyna
- Gminas: Total 6: Gmina Goczałkowice-Zdrój; Gmina Kobiór; Gmina Miedźna; Gmina Pawłowice; Gmina Pszczyna; Gmina Suszec

Area
  - Total: 473.46 km^{2} (182.80 sq mi)

Population (2019-06-30)
  - Total: 111,324
  - Density: 235.13/km^{2} (608.98/sq mi)
  - Urban: 25,823
  - Rural: 85,501
- Car plates: SPS
- Website: www.powiat.pszczyna.pl

Pszczyna County (Polish: powiat pszczyński) is a unit of territorial administration and local government (powiat) in Silesian Voivodeship, southern Poland. It came into being on January 1, 1999, as a result of the Polish local government reforms passed in 1998. Its administrative seat and only town is Pszczyna, which lies 30 kilometres (19 mi) south of the regional capital Katowice.

The county covers an area of 473.46 square kilometres (182.8 sq mi). As of 2019 its total population is 111,324, out of which the population of Pszczyna is 25,823 and the rural population is 85,501.

== Neighbouring counties ==
Pszczyna County is bordered by Mikołów County, the city of Tychy and Bieruń-Lędziny County to the north, Oświęcim County to the east, Bielsko County to the south, Cieszyn County to the south-west, and the cities of Jastrzębie-Zdrój and Żory to the west.

== Administrative divisions ==
Map of Pszczyna County

The county is subdivided into six gminas (one urban-rural and five rural). These are listed in the following table, in descending order of population.

Gmina	Type	Area (km^{2})	Population (2019)	Seat
Gmina Pszczyna	urban-rural	174.0	52,627	Pszczyna
Gmina Pawłowice	rural	75.8	18,171	Pawłowice
Gmina Miedźna	rural	49.9	16,544	Miedźna
Gmina Suszec	rural	75.6	12,331	Suszec
Gmina Goczałkowice-Zdrój	rural	48.6	6,761	Goczałkowice-Zdrój
Gmina Kobiór	rural	49.5	4,890	Kobiór
