= Bzie =

- Sołectwo of Jastrzębie-Zdrój
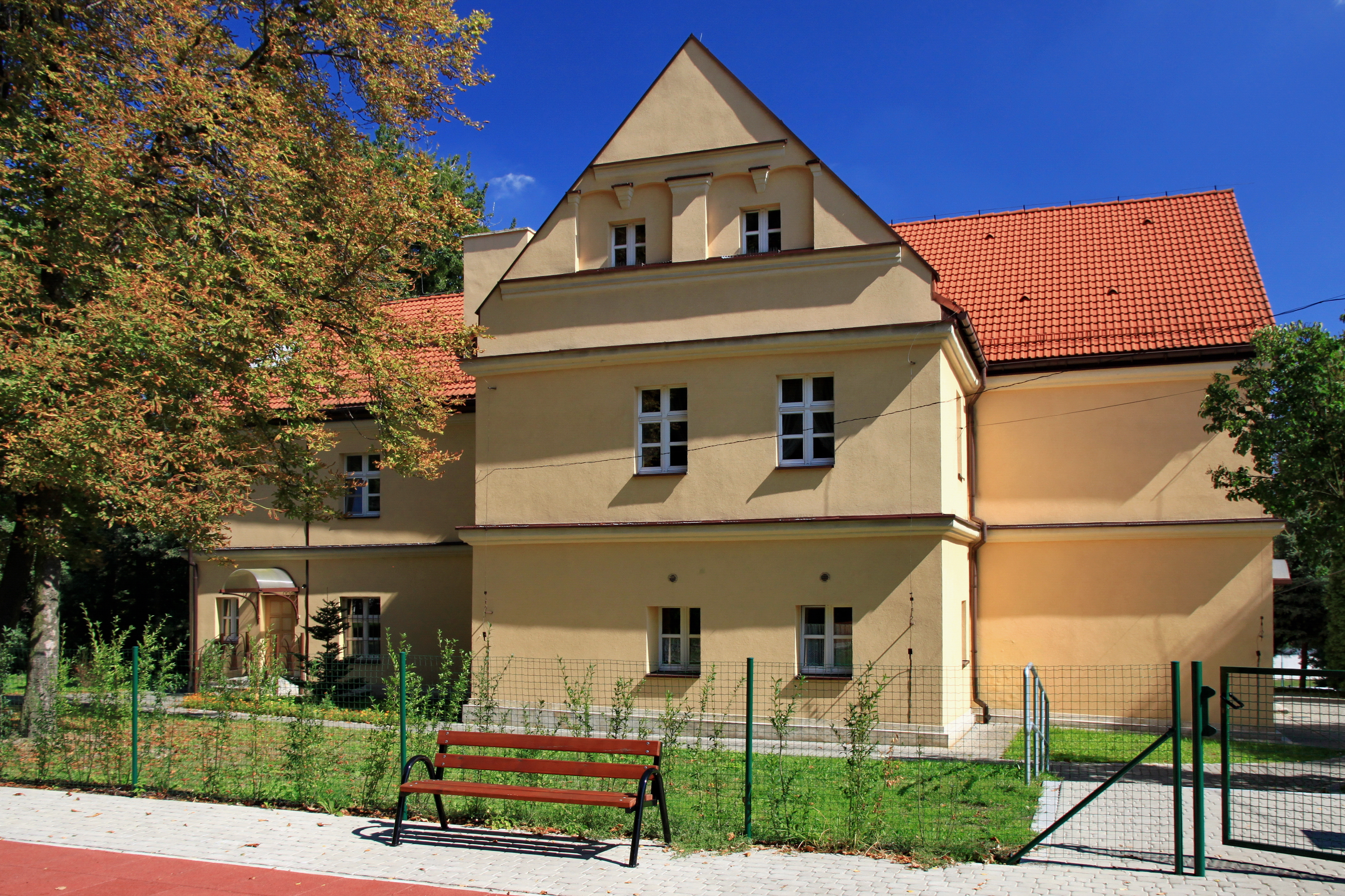
- Manor in Bzie

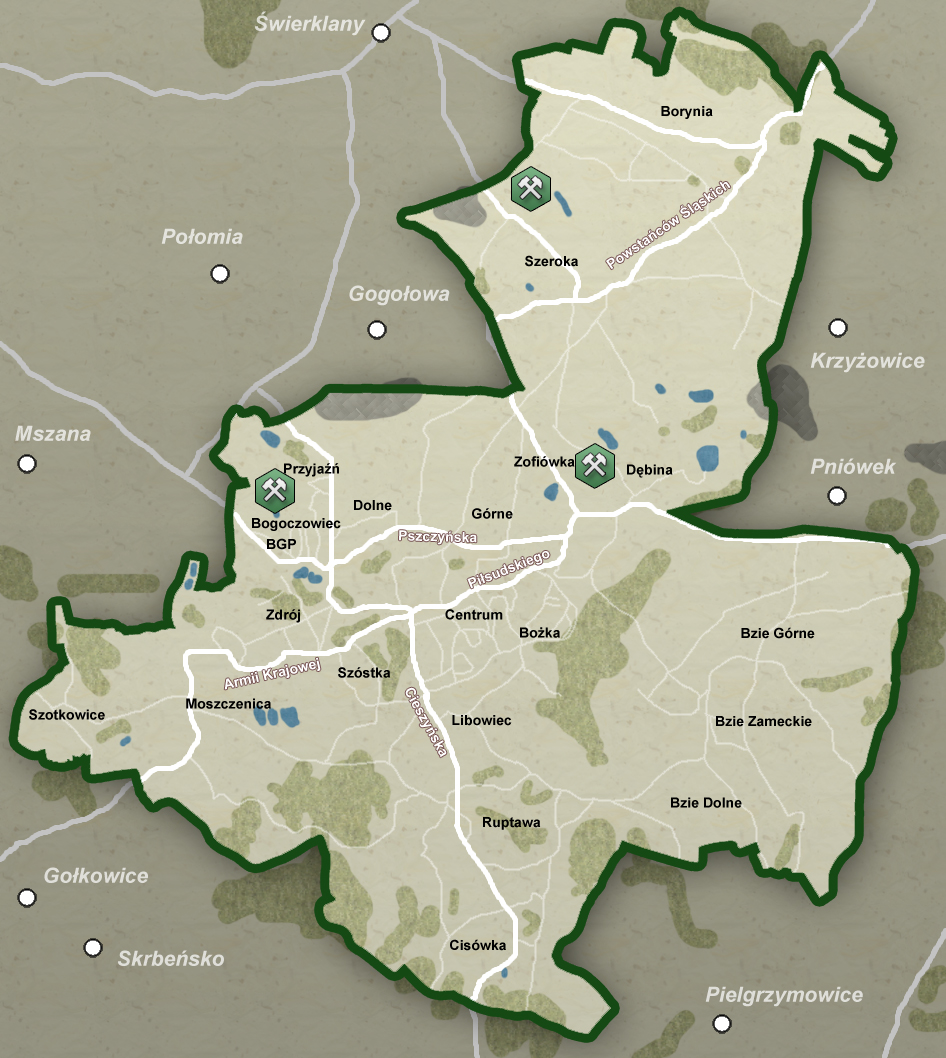
- Location of Bzie (south-east) within Jastrzębie-Zdrój
- Coordinates: 49°56′31″N 18°38′51″E
- Country: Poland
- Voivodeship: Silesian
- County/City: Jastrzębie-Zdrój

Area
  - Total: 1.72873 km^{2} (0.66747 sq mi)

Population (2012)
  - Total: 3,757
  - Density: 2,173/km^{2} (5,629/sq mi)
- Time zone: UTC+1 (CET)
  - Summer (DST): UTC+2 (CEST)
- Area code: (+48) 032

Bzie (German: Goldmannsdorf) is a sołectwo in the south-east of Jastrzębie-Zdrój, Silesian Voivodeship, southern Poland. It was an independent village but became administratively part of Jastrzębie-Zdrój in 1975.

It has an area of 1728.73 ha and on December 31, 2012, it had 3,757 inhabitants.

== History ==
The village was first mentioned as Byze and Goldmannsdorf in a document issued by Przemysław of Racibórz on October 25, 1293, allowing Wojan from Pawłowice to (re)colonize 50 Franconian lans on German law between Bzie and Golasowice. Later it was also mentioned a Latin document of Diocese of Wrocław called Liber fundationis episcopatus Vratislaviensis from around 1305 as item in Goltimanni villa debent esse LXIII mansi. The village became a seat of a Catholic parish, the first church was built probably around 1310, and was first mentioned in 1335 as Ecclesia de Goltmansdorff in an incomplete register of Peter's Pence payment in Żory deanery composed by Galhard de Carceribus. In 1409 it was mentioned as Goldmirsdorf (so hieß damals Goldmannsdorf).

Politically the village belonged then to the Duchy of Racibórz, within feudally fragmented Poland. In 1327 the duchy became a fee of the Kingdom of Bohemia, which after 1526 became part of the Habsburg monarchy. After Silesian Wars it became a part of the Kingdom of Prussia.

Three distinct parts of the village had developed throughout history: Bzie Górne (upper, in the north), Bzie Zameckie (adjective from the word zamek, castle, in the middle), Bzie Dolne (lower, in the south).

After World War I in the Upper Silesia plebiscite 152 out of 296 voters in Bzie Zameckie (Schloss Goldmannsdorf) voted in favour of joining Poland, against 142 for Germany. In Bzie Dolne (Nieder Goldmannsdorf) out of 200 voters 137 opted for staying in Germany, against 63 who voted for Poland. Whereas in Bzie Górne Ober Goldmannsdorf) 185 out of 314 were pro-Polish, against 129 pro-German, and in manor goods of Bzie Górne 31 out of 48 voted for Poland, against 17 for Germany.

In the interwar period Bzie Dolne was one of only four municipalities in the ex-Prussian Upper Silesian (thus excluding Cieszyn Silesia) part of autonomous Silesian Voivodeship which had over 50% of the Protestant population (60,6% in 1933). They belonged to parish in Golasowice.

It was later annexed by Nazi Germany at the beginning of World War II, and returned to Poland afterwards. Between 1945 and 1956 Bzie was part of the Pszczyna County and between 1957 and 1975, Bzie was part of the Wodzisław County.
