= Golasowice =

- Village
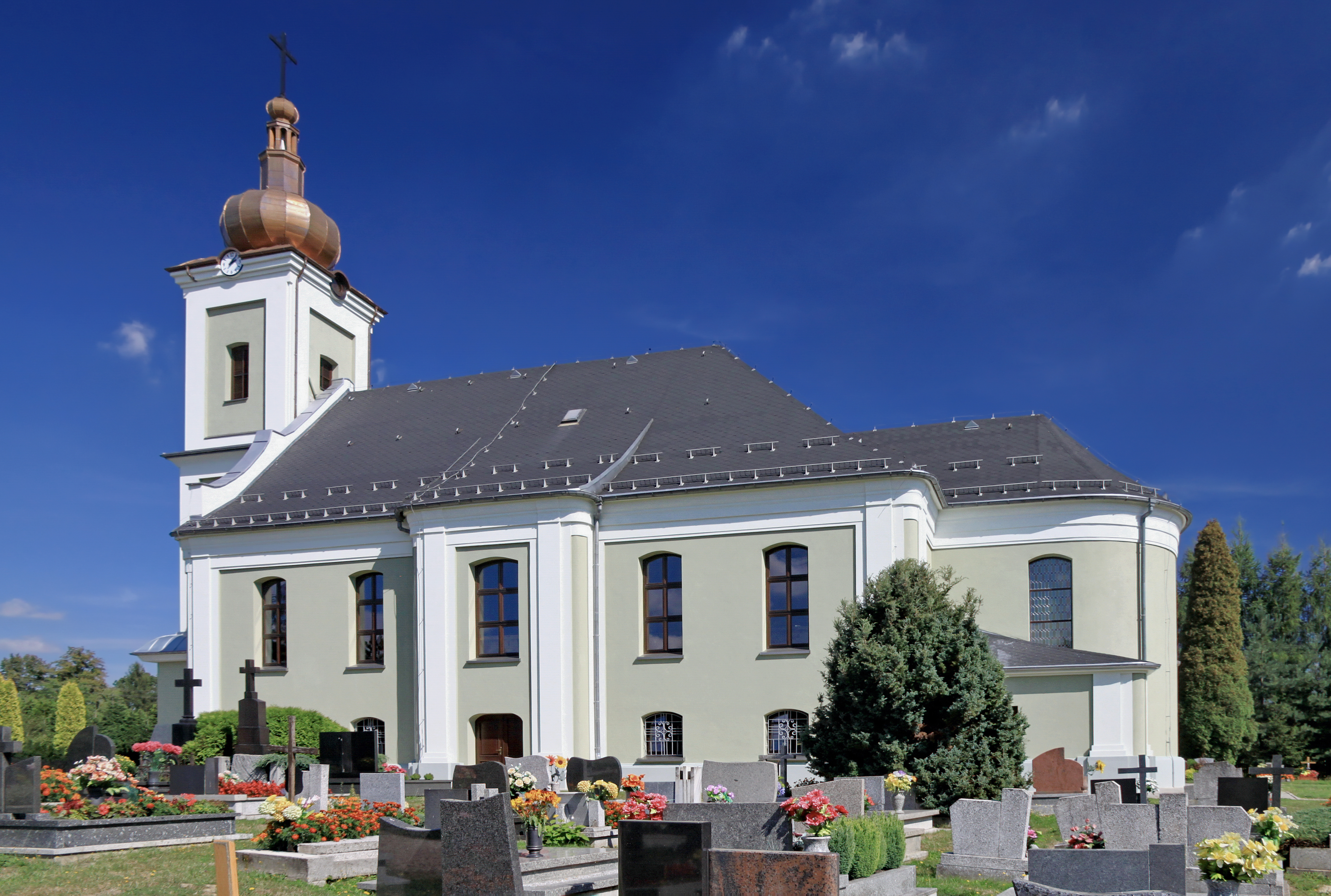
- Lutheran church

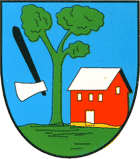
- Coat of arms

- Location within Poland
- Coordinates: 49°55′28″N 18°41′36″E
- Country: Poland
- Voivodeship: Silesian
- County: Pszczyna
- Gmina: Pawłowice
- First mentioned: 1293
- Area: 8.06 km^{2} (3.11 sq mi)
- Population: 1,210
  - Density: 150/km^{2} (389/sq mi)

Golasowice [ɡɔlasɔˈvit͡sɛ] is a village in the administrative district of Gmina Pawłowice, within Pszczyna County, Silesian Voivodeship, in southern Poland.

== History ==
The village was first mentioned in a document issued by Przemysław of Racibórz on October 25, 1293, allowing Wojan from Pawłowice to (re)colonize 50 Franconian lans on German law between Bzie and Golasowice. Later it was also mentioned in a Latin document of the Diocese of Wrocław called Liber fundationis episcopatus Vratislaviensis from around 1305. After Silesian Wars the area became a part of the Kingdom of Prussia. In 1765 a Lutheran parish was established here, served by a church that survived to modern times.

In the Upper Silesia plebiscite 385 out of 501 voted in favour of remaining in Germany, 114 for joining Poland. Nonetheless, the village became a part of Poland. In the interwar period it was one of only four municipalities in the Upper Silesian (thus excluding Cieszyn Silesia) part of autonomous Silesian Voivodeship which had Protestant majority (75,3% in 1933).
