= Gmina Miedźna =

Gmina Miedźna Miedźna Commune
- Gmina
- Flag Coat of arms
- Interactive map of Gmina Miedźna
- Coordinates (Miedźna): 49°59′N 19°3′E
- Country: Poland
- Voivodeship: Silesian
- County: Pszczyna
- Seat: Miedźna

Area
  - Total: 49.91 km^{2} (19.27 sq mi)

Population (2019-06-30)
  - Total: 16,544
  - Density: 331.5/km^{2} (858.5/sq mi)
- Website: http://www.miedzna.pl

Gmina Miedźna is a rural gmina (administrative district) in Pszczyna County, Silesian Voivodeship, in southern Poland. Its seat is the village of Miedźna, which lies approximately 8 kilometres (5 mi) east of Pszczyna and 30 km (19 mi) south of the regional capital Katowice.

The gmina covers an area of 49.91 square kilometres (19.3 sq mi), and as of 2019 its total population is 16,544.

== Villages ==
Gmina Miedźna contains the villages and settlements of Frydek, Gilowice, Góra, Grzawa, Miedźna and Wola.

== Neighbouring gminas ==
Gmina Miedźna is bordered by the gminas of Bestwina, Bojszowy, Brzeszcze, Oświęcim, Pszczyna and Wilamowice.

== Twin towns – sister cities ==
Gmina Miedźna is twinned with:

- Hustopeče, Czech Republic
- Nová Dubnica, Slovakia
- Zbarazh, Ukraine
