= Duchy of Pless =

Historic European territory in Silesia

Coordinates: 49°58′53″N 18°56′51″E

Duchy of Pless Księstwo Pszczyńskie (pl) Herzogtum Pleß (de) Ksiynstwo Pszczyny (szl)
- 1424 (from 1517 a free state) - 1922
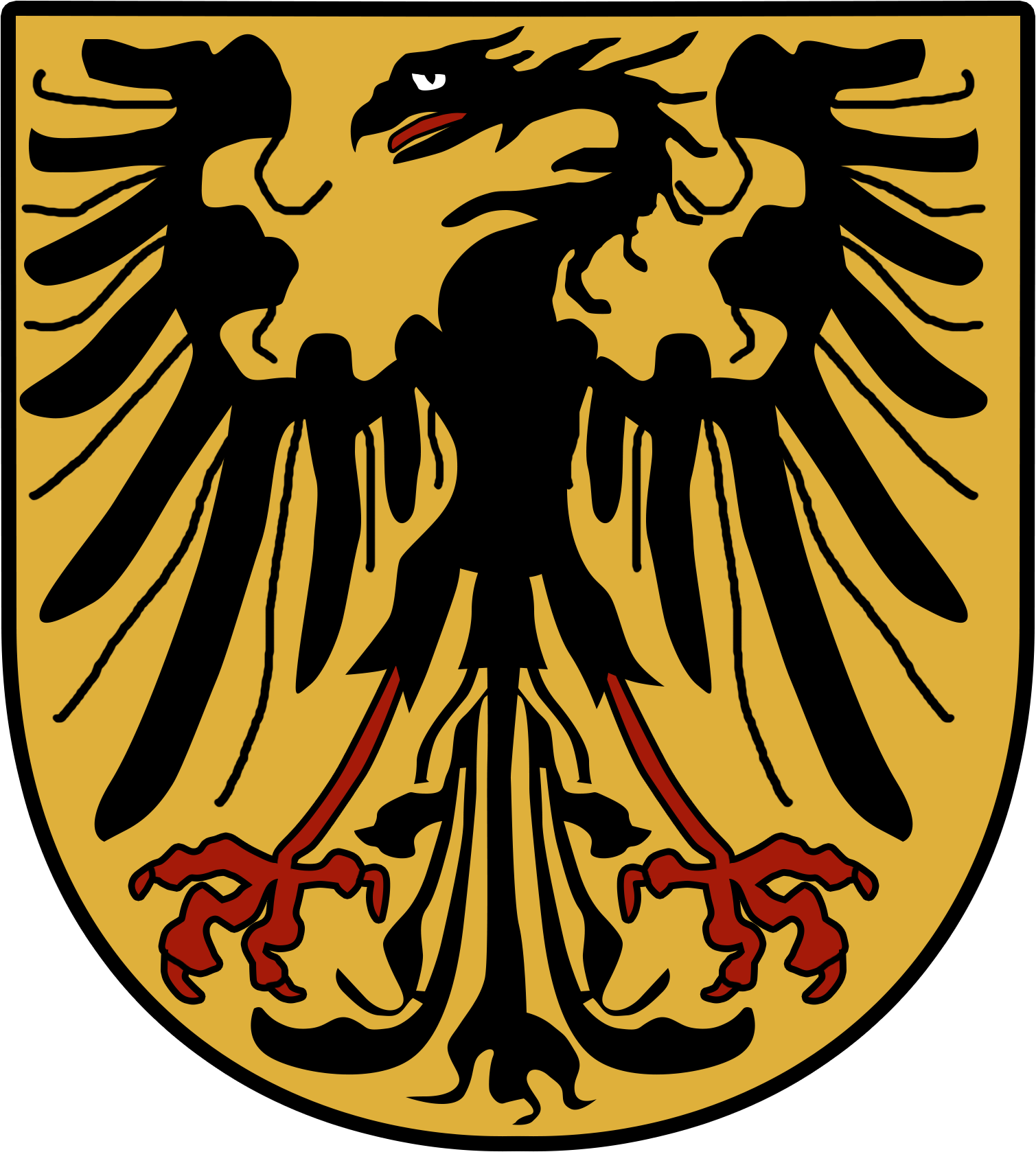
- Coat of arms

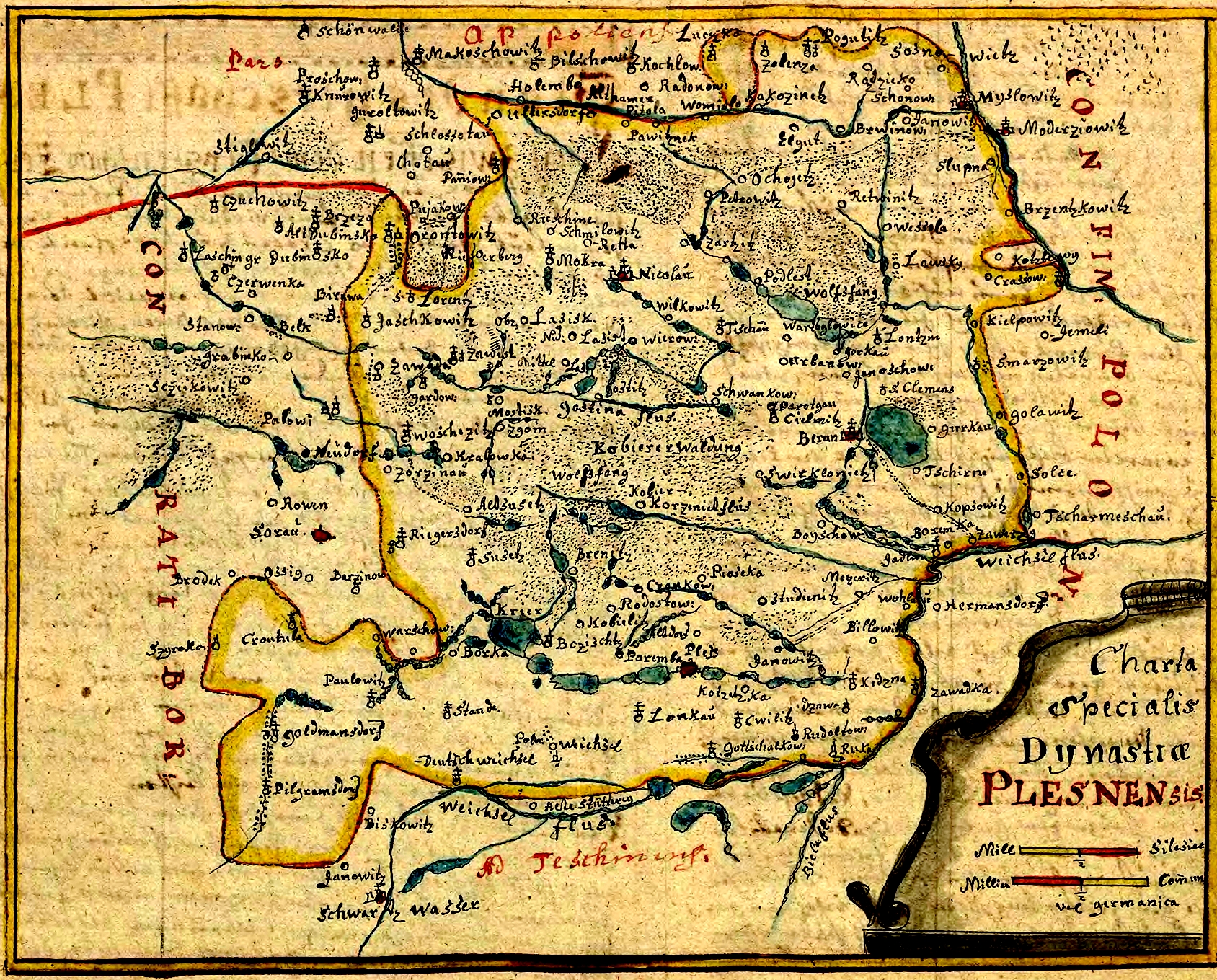
- Map of the Duchy of Pless
- Status: Silesian duchy
- Capital: Pszczyna
- Government: Monarchy
- Prince of Pless
  - 1846–1855 (first): Hans Heinrich X
  - 1861-1922 (last): Hans Heinrich XV von Hochberg
- Establishment: 1424 (from 1517 a free state)
| Preceded by | Succeeded by |
| Archduchy of Austria | Second Polish Republic |
- Today part of: Poland

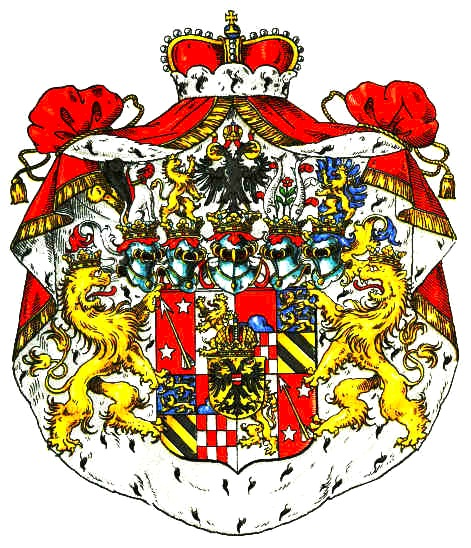
Coat of arms of the Prince of Pless, Count of Hochberg, Baron of Fürstenstein

The Duchy of Pless (or the Duchy of Pszczyna, German: Herzogtum Pleß, Silesian: Ksiynstwo Pszczyny, Polish: Księstwo Pszczyńskie) was a Duchy of Silesia, with its capital at Pless (present-day Pszczyna, Poland).

== History ==
After the fragmentation of the Polish kingdom upon the 1138 Testament of Bolesław III Krzywousty the lands around the castellany of Pszczyna belonged to the Seniorate Province of Lesser Poland (Małopolska), until in 1177 Duke Casimir II the Just granted them to the Silesian duke Mieszko I Tanglefoot. Mieszko attached Pszczyna to his Duchy of Racibórz. The Racibórz branch of the Silesian Piasts became extinct with the death of Duke Leszek in 1336.

Before his death, Leszek together with several other Dukes of Silesia had accepted vassalization by King John of Bohemia in 1327, putting his duchy in the Bohemian Crown, acknowledged by King Casimir III the Great of Poland in the 1335 Treaty of Trentschin. In 1336, King John gave the Duchy of Racibórz with Pszczyna to the Přemyslid duke Nicholas II of Opava, who had married late Duke Leszek's sister Anna of Racibórz and ruled both duchies in personal union. In 1407 Nicholas's grandson John II, Duke of Opava and Racibórz, gave the territories of Pszczyna, Bieruń, Mysłowice, and Mikołów as a dowry to his wife Helena, a niece of the Polish king Jogaila. After the acquisition of several villages south of Żory in 1412, Helena, upon the death of her husband in 1424 ruled as a Duchess of Pless, succeeded in 1452 by her daughter-in-law, Barbara Rockenberg, wife of Helena's son, Nicholas V, Duke of Ratibor-Jägerndorf, and the duchy was downgraded to a state country within the Lands of the Bohemian Crown.

From 1462 onwards, Pless was held by the sons of the Bohemian king George of Poděbrady, until Victor, Duke of Münsterberg in 1480 sold it to his son-in-law the Silesian duke Casimir II of Cieszyn. In 1517 it was acquired by the Hungarian magnates of the Thurzó family. In the accompanying sales document issued in Czech on 21 February 1517 apart from a castle and city of Pless mentions also 3 towns (Bieruń, Mysłowice, Mikołów) and 50 villages belonging to Pless: Jankowice, Woszczyce, (Note: Private village with superior law) Międzyrzecze, Bojszowy, Brzozówka, (Note: Now a hamlet of Ćwiklice.) v Wieze, (Note: krczma v Wieze s mythem mostniem a skladnym y spletny; Wieża, lost village north of Wola) Wola, Miedźna, Grzawa, Rudołtowice, Goczałkowice, Łąka, Wisła Wielka, Pawłowice, Zgoń, Brzeźce, Poręba, Stara Wieś, Czarków, Radostowice, Piasek, Studzionka, Szeroka, Krzyżowice, Warszowice, Kryry, Suszec, Kobiór, Wyry, Łaziska Dolne, Łaziska Górne, Smiłowice, Ligota, (Note: With adnotation that it's empty, abandoned.) Stara Kuźnica, Zarzecze, Podlesie, Piotrowice, Tychy, Wilkowyje, Paprocany, Cielmice, Lędziny, Brzęczkowice, Brzezinka, Zabrzeg, (Note: Later only a folwark near Bieruń.) Porąbka, (Note: Porąbka near Nowy Bieruń) Studzienice, Roździeń, Bogucice, (Note: additionally the document mentions Kuźnica Bogucka (kuznicze druha v Bohuticz).) Jaźwce, (Note: A lost village, somewhere on the territory of modern Katowice) Dziećkowice. Thurzó again sold it (with the approval of Emperor Ferdinand I, King of Bohemia) in 1548 to the Prince-Bishop of Wrocław, Balthasar von Promnitz. The Promnitz family held the duchy as a state country until 1765.

=== Principality of Pless ===
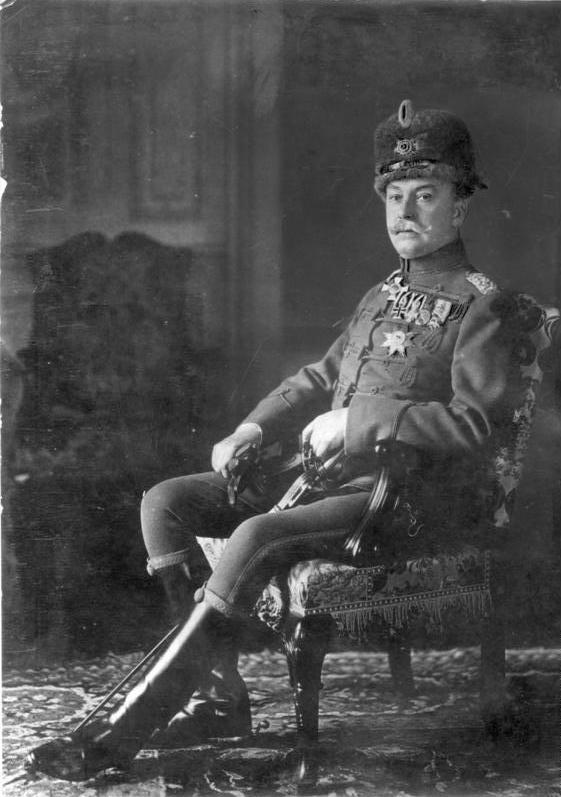
Hans Heinrich XV (1916)

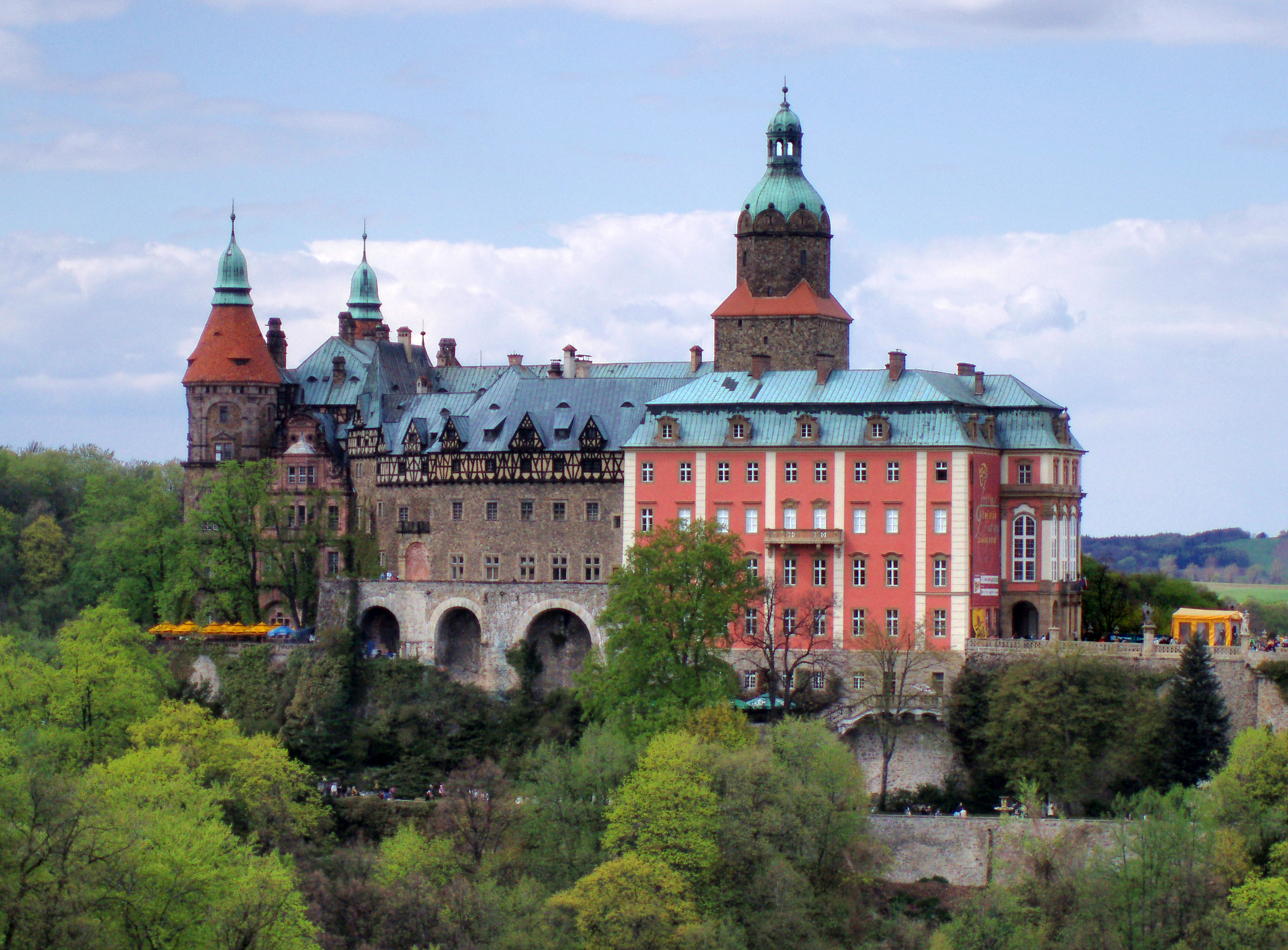
Książ (Fürstenstein) Castle, since 1509 owned by the counts of Hochberg

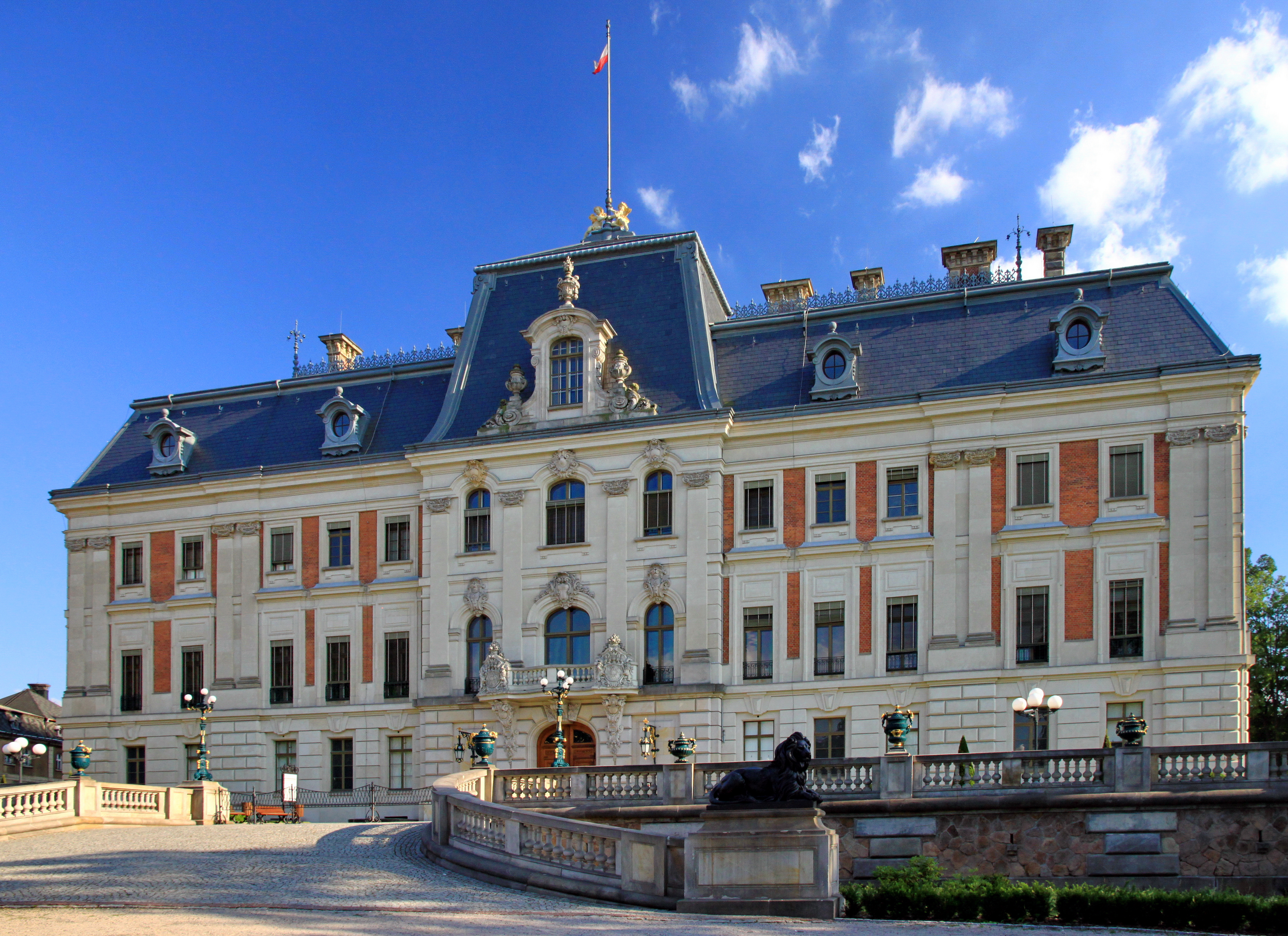
Pszczyna (Pless) Palace

In the War of the Austrian Succession most of Silesia was conquered by the Kingdom of Prussia; but the Dukes, and later Princes, of Pless would remain the rulers of the territory. Since 1742 Pless was a state country within Brandenburg-Prussia.

The Dukes of Anhalt-Köthen-Pless inherited it in 1765 (being descended from the earlier dukes in the female line), the last of them died in 1847, and was succeeded by his nephew, Hans Heinrich X, Count of Hochberg, and first president of the Prussian House of Lords. The Hochbergs, from Fürstenstein near Waldenburg (in Lower Silesia), were father, son and grandson: Hans Heinrich X, XI, and XV; they were among the wealthiest families in the Holy Roman Empire, in part because of the mines of Pless.

The incumbents of state countries (Standesherren) had no sovereignty over their possessions, but held the privileges to supervise religion, charitable endowments, school education, and lower jurisdiction. In 1830 the Prussian state stripped all Standesherren of their juridical competences and subjected their remaining privileges to state supervision. The Prince's power over his land, since 1807 constituted as alienable allodial property, and thus his influence on its tenants was very great; for example, when the Duke of Ratibor, who had represented the constituency of the districts of Pless and Rybnik in the North German parliament of the North German Confederation, ran in the first election to the Imperial German Reichstag in 1871, Hans Heinrich XI, Prince of Pless, endorsed him, and was able to enlist even the constabulary, servants of the Prussian state, as election workers; he also threatened the economic well-being of those who opposed his candidate. But the Prince's power was not absolute; the opposition candidate, the "already semi-canonized" Father Eduard Müller, a priest born in Quilitz near Glogau who was active as Catholic missionary in Protestant Berlin, won anyway. This electoral surprise was one of the first great successes of the German Catholic Centre Party which Müller had co-founded; they retained the seat until 1903, when much of the Centre Party's delegation from Upper Silesia was replaced, although by very thin majorities, by the Polish National Democrats.

The Princes of Pless regarded themselves as benevolent lords. Hans Heinrich XI introduced a pension scheme in 1879, before Bismarck's social legislation; also company housing and other social measures. But worker discontent under his son reached the point of a public petition to the Imperial Reichstag.

Alexander II of Russia gave the Hochbergs a herd of wisents in 1864 or 1865, the herd was broken up and reduced to three survivors by poaching at the time of the German Revolution in the aftermath of the First World War.

The Hochbergs were Princes of Pless in the Prussian peerage; however, in 1905, Hans Heinrich XI was created Duke of Pless, for his lifetime only - in part because he had been a Prince for fifty years; in Germany, dukes outranked princes (Fürsten).

Hans Heinrich XV succeeded in 1907; he had married Mary Theresa Cornwallis-West, better known as Daisy, Princess of Pless. He was one of the Kaiser's adjutants during the First World War; several important planning conferences were held at Pless itself during the war; and when the Central powers decided to create a Kingdom of Poland as a German-Austrian protectorate, Hans Heinrich (and, according to his wife, his two elder sons) were among the many to be considered for (and decline) the vacant throne, in part because of their Polish descent.

The Prussian Government attempted to Germanize or assimilate the ethnic Poles on its conquered territories, culminating in the Polish Expropriation Act of 1908, which Hans Heinrich XV opposed. The greatest efforts in defence against Germanisation were made by regional newspaper called "Tygodnik Polski Poświęcony Włościanom" ("Polish Weekly for Estate Owners"), which was the first newspaper printed in Polish in Upper Silesia. The town of Pless was 94.3% Polish in 1829; the whole district remained 86% Polish as late as 1867. After 1918, with the end of monarchy in Prussia, the state country privileges were abolished. The noble titles were abolished in Germany in 1919 by the Weimar constitution, but transformed into parts of the family names, thus until 1919 the family name was of Hochberg and of Pless and the title count and prince, respectively, the family name became Graf von Hochberg and Fürst von Pleß, only conveniently, but legally incorrectly, still translated as Count of Hochberg, Prince of Pless into English.

In the plebiscite of March 20, 1921 in accordance with the Treaty of Versailles about 75% of the voters in the Pless lands voted to join Poland; and the principality was awarded to Poland after the Third Silesian Uprising. The voters in the city of Pless (Polish: Pszczyna), however, voted to remain within Germany, with a 67% majority. The Pless land therefore became part of Second Polish Republic in 1922.

The Hochberg family owned Książ (Fürstenstein) Castle until 1944. The castle and the lands were then seized by the Nazi government because the Prince of Pless, Hans Heinrich XVII moved to England in 1932 and became a British citizen and his brother Count Alexander of Hochberg, owner of Pszczyna Castle and a Polish citizen, had joined the Polish army. Fürstenstein castle was a part of the Project Riese until 1945 when it was occupied by the Red army. All artifacts were stolen or destroyed.

=== Princes of Pless (Kingdom of Prussia, circa 1850) ===
- Hans Heinrich X, 1st Prince of Pless c.1850-1855 (1806-1855)
  - Hans Heinrich XI, 2nd Prince of Pless 1855-1907, Duke of Pless 1905-1907
    - Hans Heinrich XV, 3rd Prince of Pless 1907-1938 (1861-1938)
      - Hans Heinrich XVII, 4th Prince of Pless 1938-1984 (1900-1984)
      - Alexander, 5th Prince of Pless 1984 (1905-1984)
      - Bolko (1910-1936)
        - Bolko, 6th Prince of Pless 1984-2022 (1936-2022)
  - Hans Heinrich XII (1835-1835)
  - Hans Heinrich XIII Conrad (1837-1858)
  - Hans Heinrich XIV (1843-1926)
    - Hans Heinrich XVI (1874-1933)
      - Hans Heinrich XVIII Wilhelm Bolko (1905-1989)
      - Christoph Hartmann (1908-1936)
    - Friedrich Franz (1875-1954)
      - Friedrich Hartmann Bolko (1910-1945)
      - Karl Albrecht Heinrich (1912-1979)
        - Hans Heinrich XIX (b.1954) - renounced succession rights 2003
          - Hans Heinrich XX Constantin Albrecht (b.1984) - renounced succession rights 2003
        - Peter Konrad Friedrich, 7th Prince of Pless, 2022–present (b.1956)
          - Bolko Hans Heinrich XXI Maximilian (b.1992)
          - Albrecht Heinrich Konrad Wilhelm (b.1995)
        - Maximilian Albrecht Mathias (b.1958)
          - Moritz Georg Dietrich Albrecht Antonius (b.1993)
          - Caspar Peter Christian Maria (b.1995)
        - Philipp Johannes Wilhelm (b.1963)
          - Calixt Albrecht Ulrich (b.2001)
      - Konrad Eberhard Georg Richard (1916-1945) - exist male heirs
      - Wilhelm Dietrich Lothar Maximilian (b.1920) - exist male heirs
