= Grzawa =

- Village
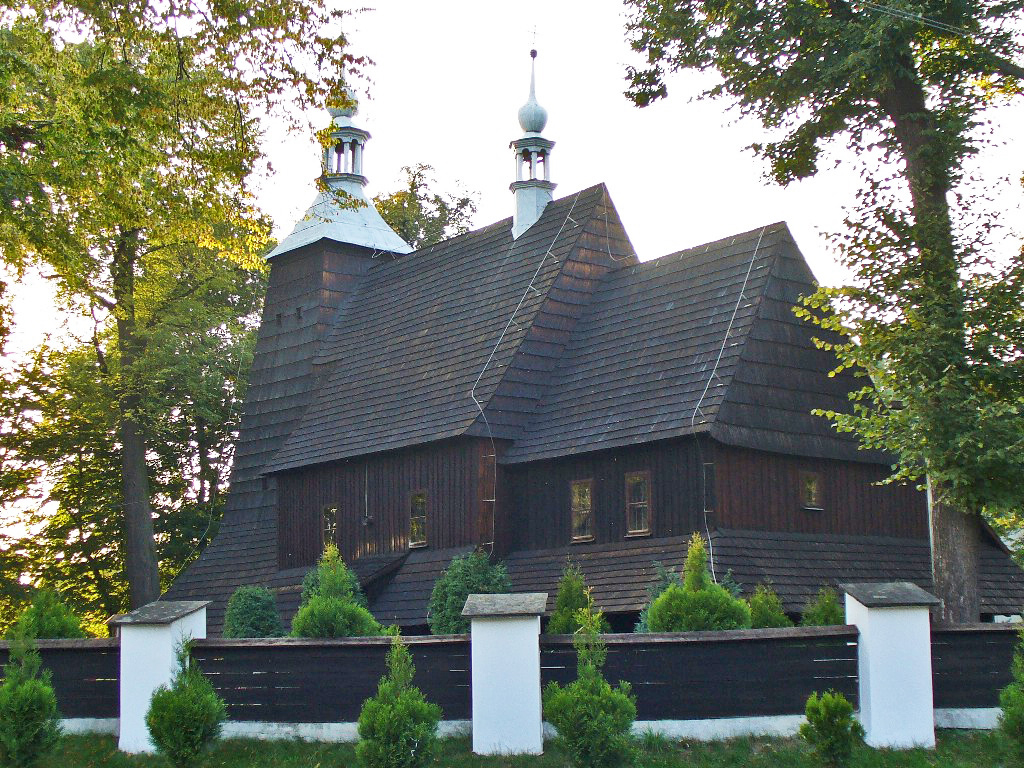
- Saint John the Baptist church

- Location within Poland
- Coordinates: 49°57′38″N 19°03′28″E
- Country: Poland
- Voivodeship: Silesian
- County: Pszczyna
- Gmina: Miedźna
- Elevation: 260 m (850 ft)
- Population: 463
- Time zone: UTC+1 (CET)
  - Summer (DST): UTC+2 (CEST)
- Vehicle registration: SPS

Grzawa [ˈɡʐava] is a village in the administrative district of Gmina Miedźna, within Pszczyna County, Silesian Voivodeship, in southern Poland.

== History ==
In the Middle Ages, the area was part of the territory of the Vistulans tribe, one of the Polish tribes. It became part of the emerging Polish state in the 10th century. As a result of the fragmentation of Poland, it was part of the Polish Seniorate Province and Duchy of Racibórz. Later on, the village passed under Bohemian (Czech) suzerainty, and in the 15th century, it became part of the newly formed Duchy of Pszczyna. During the political upheaval caused by Matthias Corvinus the duchy was overtaken in 1480 by Casimir II, Duke of Cieszyn from the Piast dynasty, who sold it in 1517 to the Hungarian magnates of the Thurzó family, forming the Pless state country. In the accompanying sales document issued on 21 February 1517 the village was mentioned as Rzawa. Along with the Kingdom of Bohemia in 1526, it became part of the Habsburg monarchy. In the War of the Austrian Succession most of Silesia was conquered by the Kingdom of Prussia, including the village, and in 1871 it became part of the German Empire. After World War I, Poland regained independence, and following the subsequent Polish Silesian Uprisings against Germany, the village was reintegrated with the reborn Polish state.
