= Eduard Müller (German politician) =

German Catholic priest and politician (1818–1895)

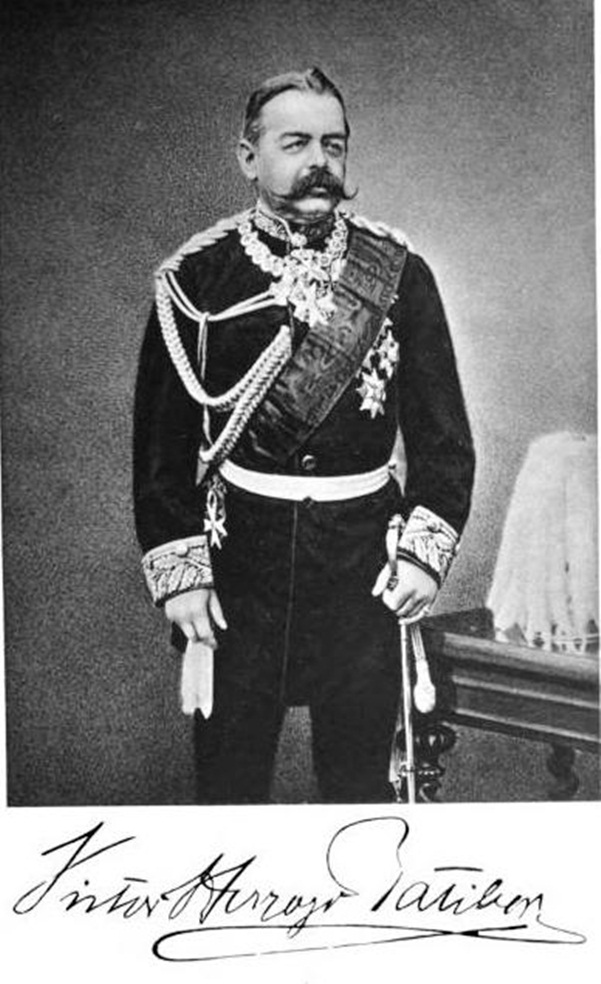
Victor Herzog von Ratibor

Eduard Müller (born 15 November 1818 in Quilitz near Glogau – 6 January 1895 in Neisse) was a German Roman Catholic priest and politician from the Prussian Province of Silesia.

The priest was since 1852 a missionary vicar in Berlin who promoted the foundation of Catholic communities in and near Berlin, like the St.-Eduard-Gemeinde which officially opened at Kranholdplatz in Berlin-Rixdorf in 1907.

In Protestant Prussia, Müller was elected to the Preußischer Landtag (Prussian Diet) in November 1870, during the Franco-Prussian War. At that time Bismarck on behalf of the North German Confederation negotiated with the mostly Catholic Southern German states in order to form a unified nation state. When the Prussian assembly first met in December, Müller lobbied for a unification of the Catholic members into a fraction He is credited as a co-founder of the Centre Party (Germany) (Deutsche Zentrumspartei) in 1871.

In the 1871 elections to the new Reichstag, he surprisingly defeated the incumbent in the constituency of the Duchy of Pless-Rybnik in of Upper Silesia, Victor Herzog von Ratibor, the Duke of Ratibor, a Free Conservative Catholic aristocratic landowner who recently had headed a delegation to the Vatican. Silesian magnates were accustomed to dictating elections.

Liberal deputy Eduard Lasker expressed the shock of the entire chamber about the "astonishing victory of a nobody" and that the eminent incumbent had been 'driven out of his district in the name of the Catholic religion', by a man like Father Eduard Müller "whose merits," as Lasker put it, "may be extraordinarily great, only the world knows little of them, and still less the district in which he has been elected."

He used to live behind Katholische Kirche 4–5 in Berlin-Mitte where his house was a centre for workers, the poor, and travellers. In 1984 the Eduard-Müller-Platz square in Neukölln was named after him.

The 19th century politician in Reichstag minutes called "half-saintly" is not to be confused with the priest Eduard Müller (1911–1943) who in 1943 was executed as one of the Lübeck martyrs by the Nazis, for which these martyrs are considered for beatification since 2003.
