= Poręba, Pszczyna County =

Poręba
- Village
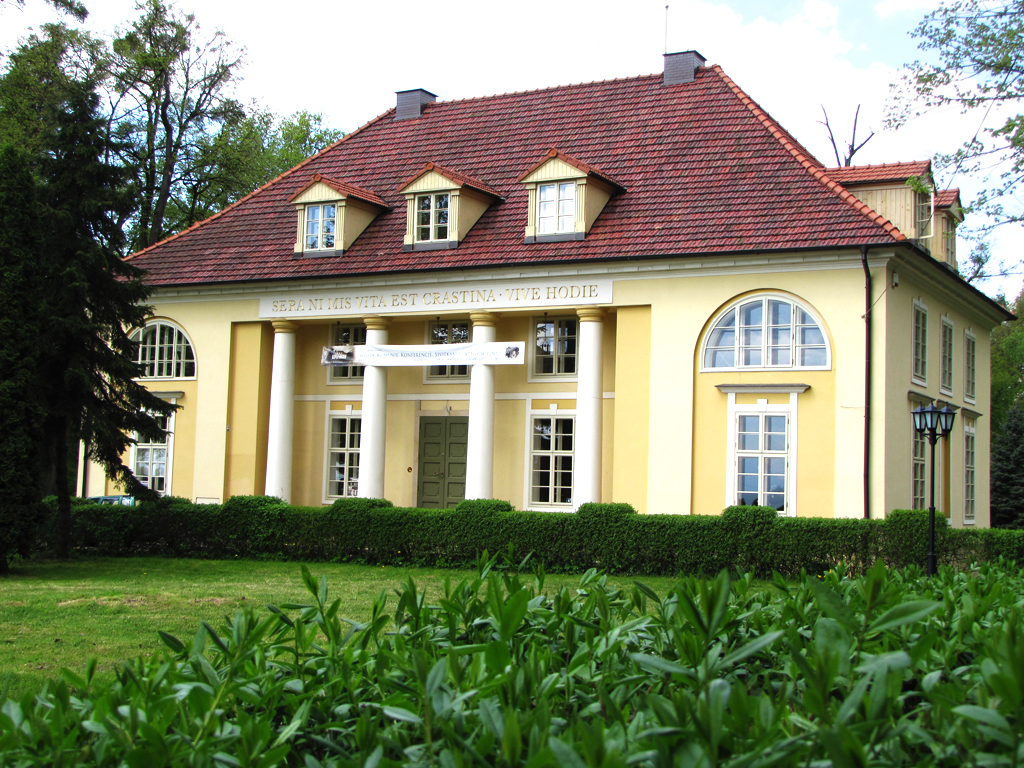
- The Princely Pheasantry Conference Centre in Poręba

- Location within Poland
- Coordinates: 49°59′18″N 18°52′35″E
- Country: Poland
- Voivodeship: Silesian
- County: Pszczyna
- Gmina: Pszczyna
- Population (approx.): 900
- Time zone: UTC+1 (CET)
  - Summer (DST): UTC+2 (CEST)
- Vehicle registration: SPS

Poręba (Polish pronunciation: ['pɔˈrɛmba]) is a village in the administrative district of Gmina Pszczyna, within Pszczyna County, Silesian Voivodeship, in southern Poland.

== History ==
In the Middle Ages, the area was part of the territory of the Vistulans tribe, one of the Polish tribes. It became part of the emerging Polish state in the 10th century. The village was established in the late 13th or early 14th century, when it was part of fragmented Piast-ruled Poland. The name comes from the Polish word poręba and is common throughout Poland.

During the political upheaval caused by Matthias Corvinus the land around Pszczyna was overtaken by Casimir II, Duke of Cieszyn, who sold it in 1517 to the Hungarian magnates of the Thurzó family, forming the Pless state country. In the accompanying sales document issued on 21 February 1517 the village was mentioned as Poruby. The Kingdom of Bohemia in 1526 became part of the Habsburg monarchy. In the War of the Austrian Succession in the mid-18th century most of Silesia was conquered by the Kingdom of Prussia, including the village. The local populace suffered from epidemics in 1555, 1847 and 1879, and hunger in 1600, 1713, 1746, 1759, 1847 and 1879. French troops were stationed in the village during the Napoleonic Wars in 1808. In 1871 it became part of Germany. In 1918, after World War I, Poland regained independence, and the populace began preparation to rejoin Poland. In February 1919, the inhabitants led by Paweł Dobija established a Polish council. Inhabitants of Poręba joined the Silesian Uprisings, which goal was to reintegrate the region with Poland, and the village was then officially reintegrated with Poland in 1922.

During the German-Soviet invasion of Poland, which started World War II, the village was captured by Germany on September 2, 1939. Already on September 4, one of the inhabitants was among Poles murdered by the Germans in nearby Pszczyna. Under German occupation, usage of the Polish language was prohibited, the population was obliged to use the Nazi salute, the local Polish population was classified as Polonized Germans, Poles who refused to sign the Volksliste were subjected to repressions, including confiscations of property, police surveillance and potential deportations to Nazi concentration camps, while Poles who agreed were often forcibly conscripted to the Wehrmacht. Two local Polish activists, Michał Kurtok and Paweł Dobija, were murdered in the Buchenwald and Dachau concentration camps. In January 1945, Poręba was the site of atrocities committed by the Germans during the death march of the prisoners of the Auschwitz concentration camp. There are three memorials commemorating the victims, two mass graves of the murdered prisoners, and the grave of a three-week-old child born by one of the prisoners. 36 escaped prisoners were rescued by various Polish families who hid them and gave them shelter. In February 1945, the village was captured by the Soviets, who often robbed Polish households, and even murdered two inhabitants. Soviet troops left the village in May 1945, and it was restored to Poland, however, the village was still attacked several times by Russian deserters-robbers.

== Gallery ==
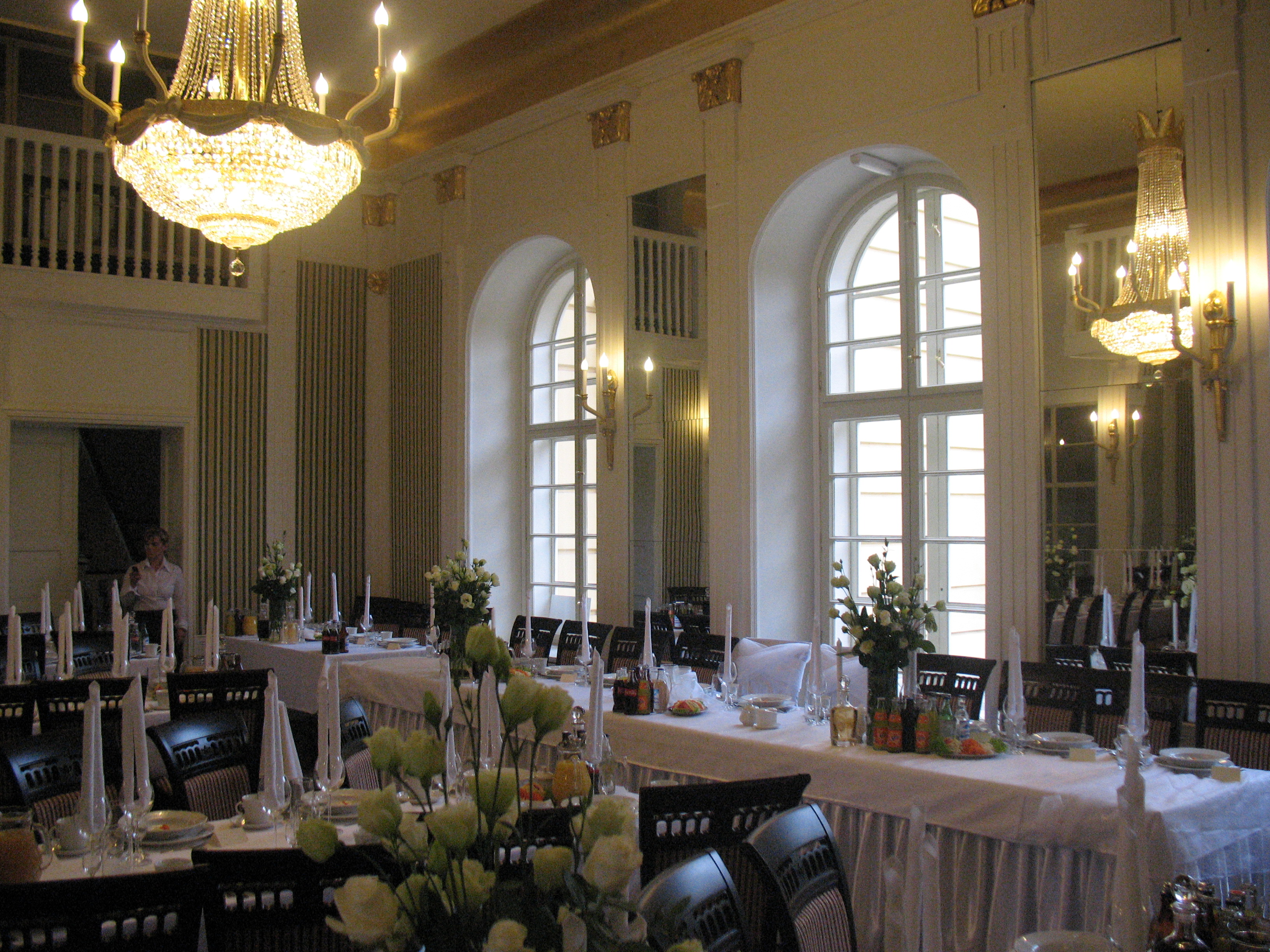
Main hall of The Princely Pheasantry

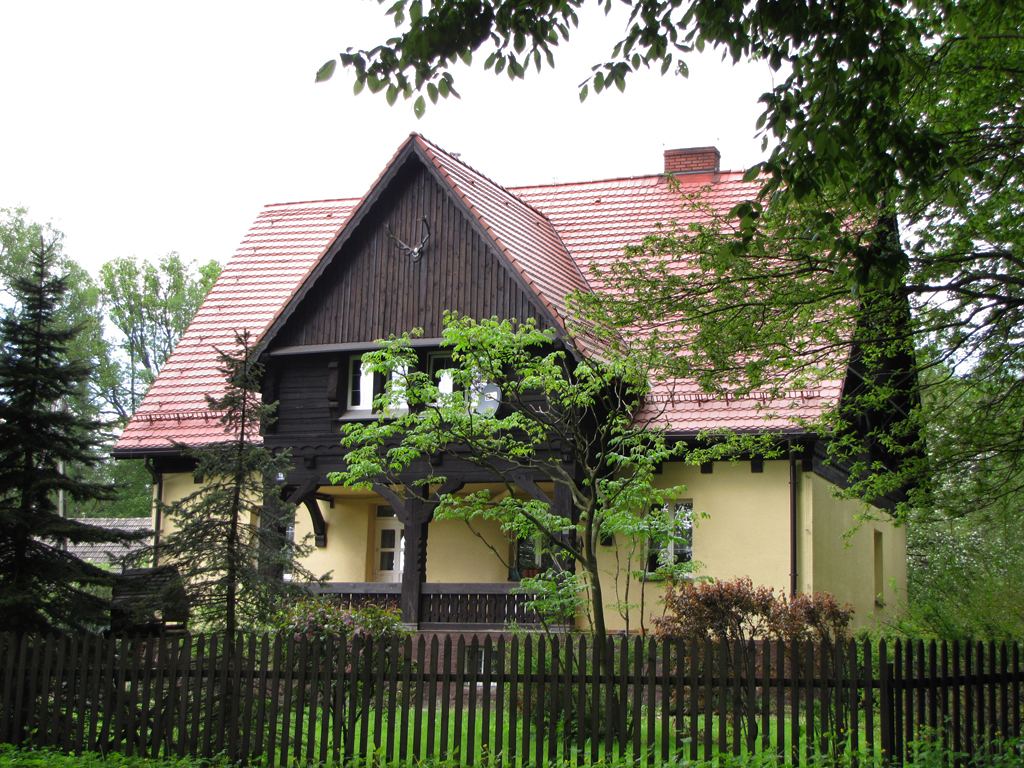
Forester's lodge

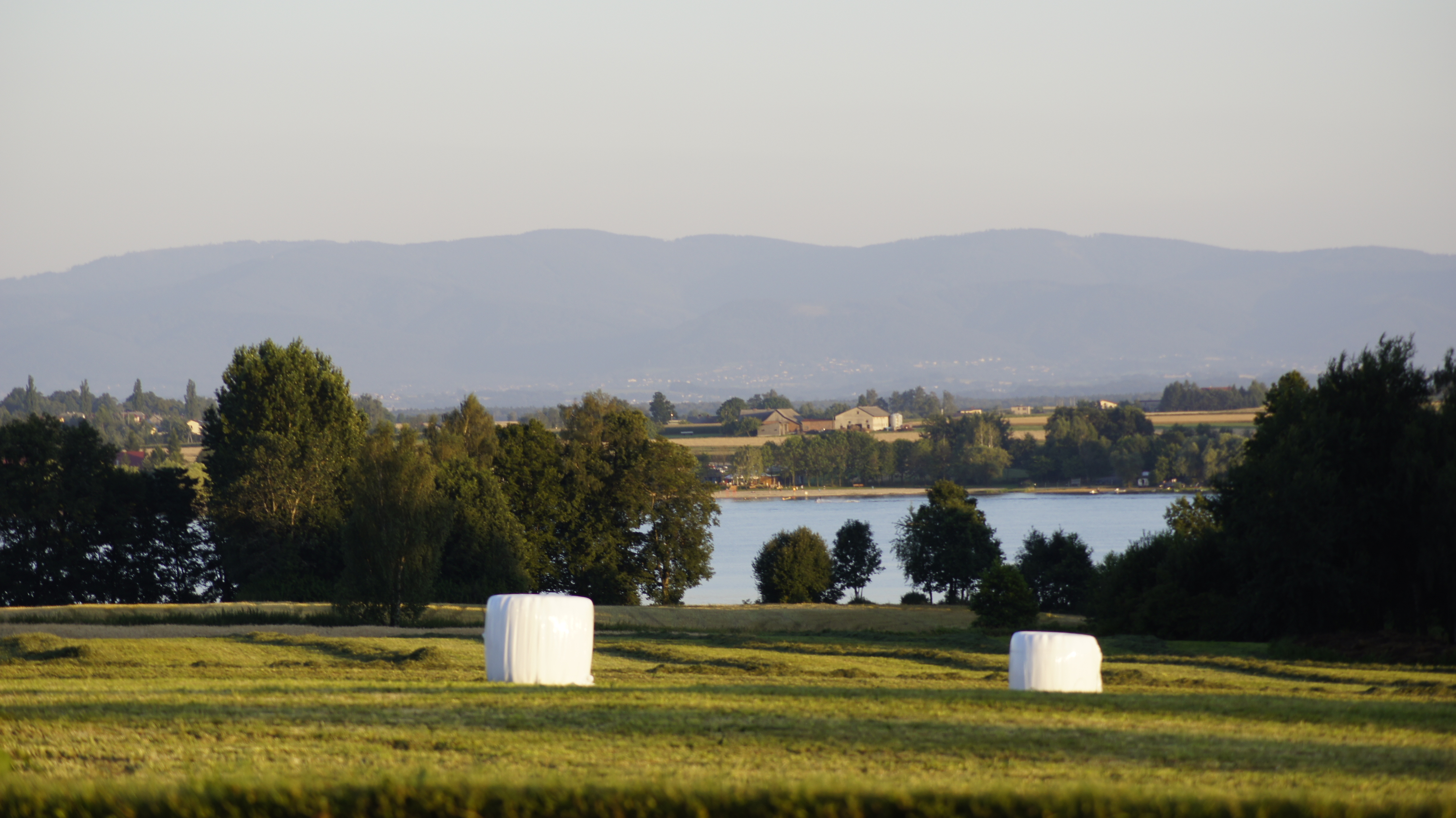
Łąka Reservoir

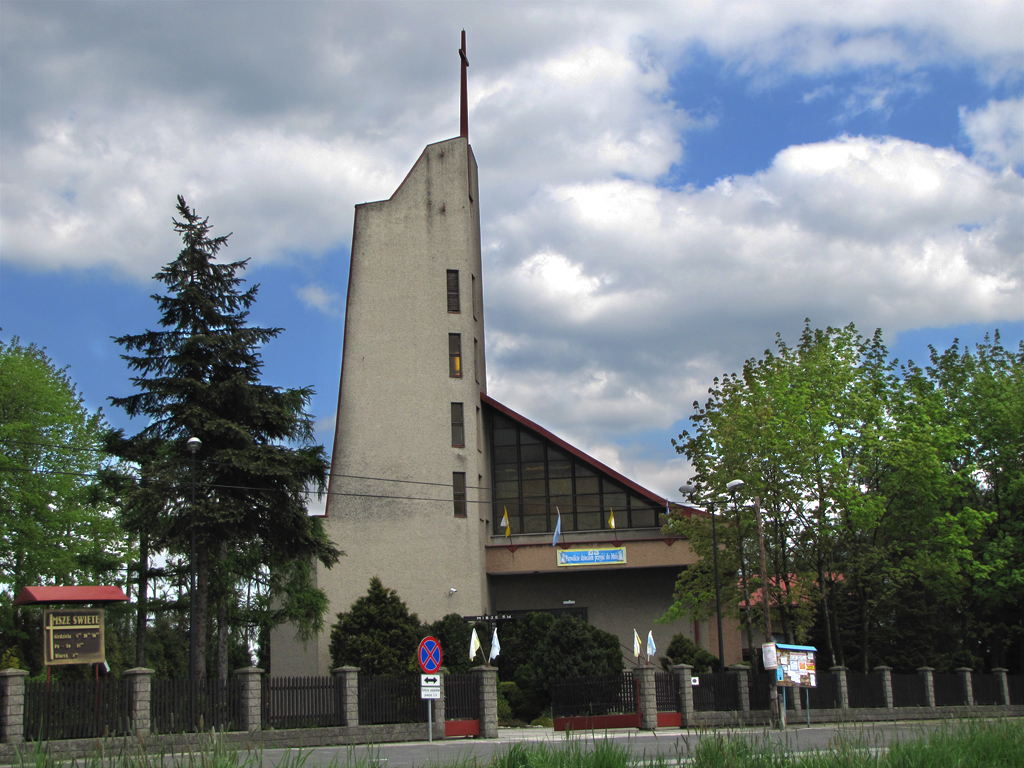
Saint Maksymilian Kolbe church
