= Jarząbkowice, Silesian Voivodeship =

Jarząbkowice
- Village
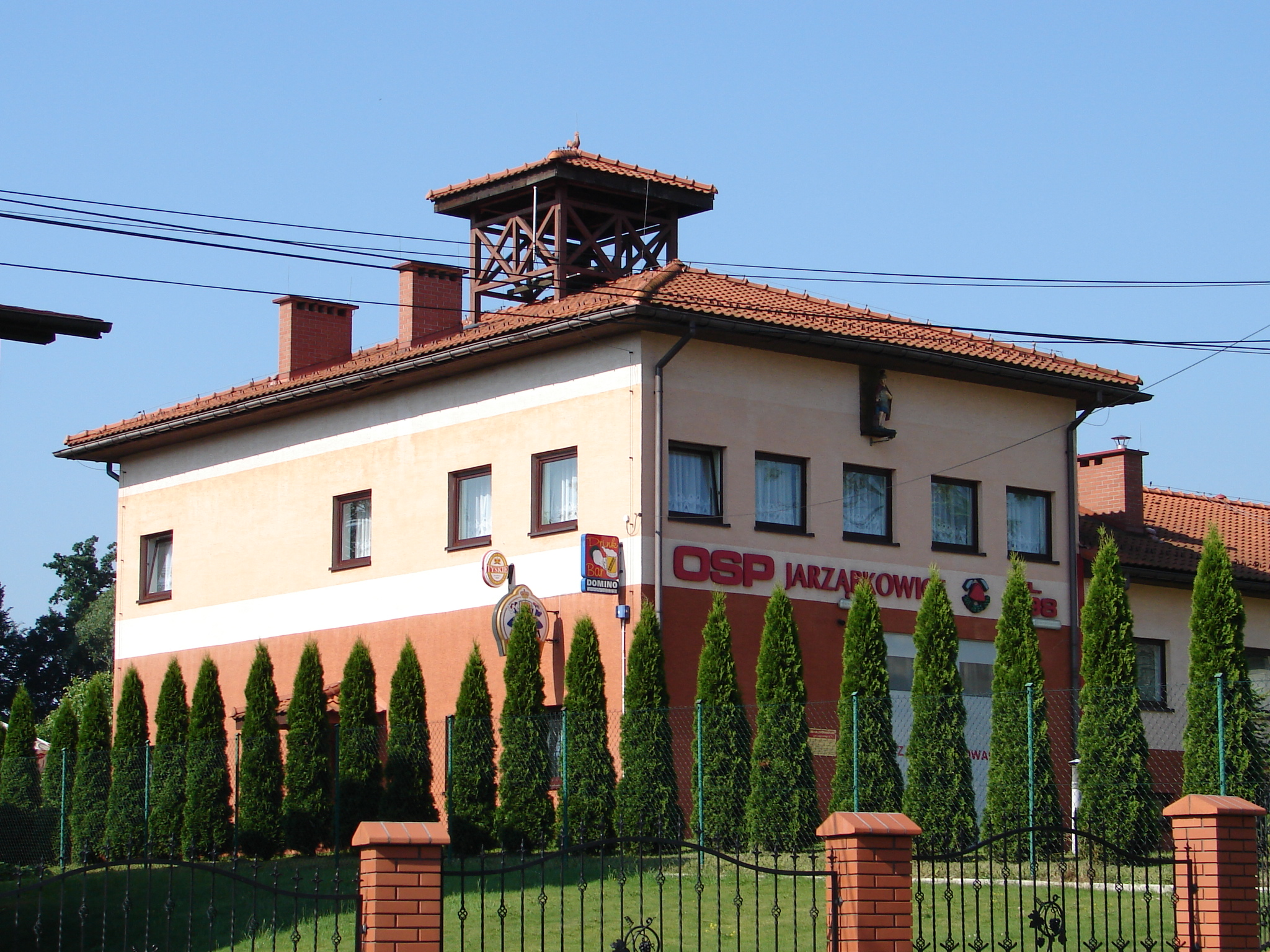
- Fire station

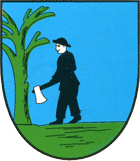
- Coat of arms

- Location within Poland
- Coordinates: 49°54′14″N 18°42′36″E
- Country: Poland
- Voivodeship: Silesian
- County: Pszczyna
- Gmina: Pawłowice
- First mentioned: ca. 1305
- Area: 6.77 km^{2} (2.61 sq mi)
- Population: 627
  - Density: 92.6/km^{2} (240/sq mi)

Jarząbkowice [jaʐɔmpkɔˈvit͡sɛ] is a village in the administrative district of Gmina Pawłowice, within Pszczyna County, Silesian Voivodeship, in southern Poland.

The village was first mentioned in a Latin document of Diocese of Wrocław called Liber fundationis episcopatus Vratislaviensis from around 1305 as item Geranczcovitz. The creation of the village was a part of a larger settlement campaign taking place in the late 13th century on the territory of what will be later known as Upper Silesia.
