= Nová Dubnica =

- Municipality
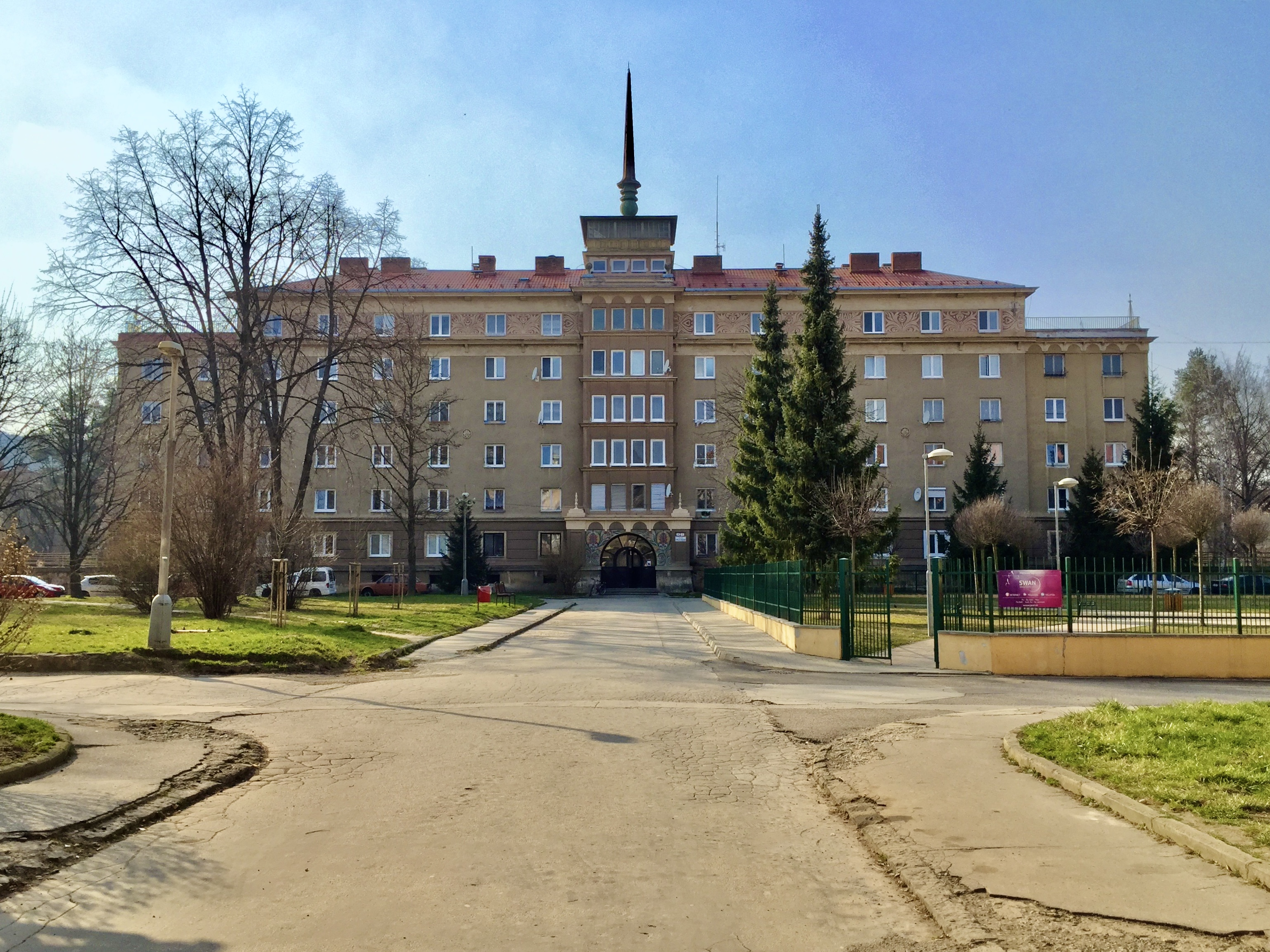

- Flag Coat of arms

- Location of Nová Dubnica in the Trenčín Region Location of Nová Dubnica in Slovakia
- Coordinates: 48.93°N 18.14°E
- Country: Slovakia
- Region: Trenčín Region
- District: Ilava District
- First mentioned: 1957

Government
  - Mayor: Peter Marušinec

Area
  - Total: 11.25 km^{2} (4.34 sq mi)
- Elevation: 258 m (846 ft)

Population (2025)
  - Total: 10,130
- Time zone: UTC+1 (CET)
  - Summer (DST): UTC+2 (CEST)
- Postal code: 185 1
- Area code: +421 42
- Vehicle registration plate (until 2022): IL
- Website: www.novadubnica.eu

Nová Dubnica (German: Neudubnitz; Hungarian: Újtölgyes; Czech: Nová Dubnice) is a town in Trenčín Region, Slovakia.

== Geography ==
The municipality lies at an altitude of 258 metres (846 ft) and covers an area of 11.25 km^{2} (4.34 sq mi) (2025).

It is located in the Ilava Basin at the foothills of the Strážovské vrchy mountains.

== History ==
The town was established in the 1950s originally for the purpose of housing workers of the local heavy machinery factory Závody ťažkého strojárstva. Therefore, it can be described as a bedroom community. Construction started in 1951, and became separate from Dubnica nad Váhom and from parts of cadastral areas of Trenčianske Teplice and Veľký Kolačin municipalities in 1957 and was named Nová Dubnica and received town rights in 1960. In 1971 municipality of Kolačín made of Malý Kolačín and Velký Kolačín was annexed to the town.

== Population ==
Historical population
Year	Pop.	±%
1970	10,906	—
1980	12,488	+14.5%
1991	12,590	+0.8%
2001	12,358	−1.8%
2011	11,466	−7.2%
2021	10,884	−5.1%
Source: Censuses

Population statistic (10 years)
Year	1995	2005	2015	2025
Count	12,558	11,997	11,186	10,130
Difference		−4.46%	−6.76%	−9.44%

Population statistic
Year	2024	2025
Count	10,272	10,130
Difference		−1.38%

It has a population of 10,130 people (31 December 2025).

=== Ethnicity ===
Census 2021 (1+ %)
Ethnicity	Number	Fraction
Slovak	10,137	93.13%
Not found out	637	5.85%
Czech	184	1.69%
Total	10,884	

In year 2021 was 10,884 people by ethnicity 10,137 as Slovak, 637 as Not found out, 184 as Czech, 35 as Other, 27 as Hungarian, 23 as Russian, 12 as German, 10 as Ukrainian, 10 as Rusyn, 9 as English, 7 as Moravian, 6 as Italian, 6 as Serbian, 4 as Romani, 4 as Polish, 3 as Jewish, 3 as Croatian, 2 as Korean, 2 as Canadian, 1 as Irish, 1 as Turkish, 1 as Silesian, 1 as Austrian and 1 as Albanian.

Note on population: The difference values of population numbers in the table "Population statistic" and in the sections "Ethnicity" & "Religion" is caused by the use of various statistical methods.

=== Religion ===
Census 2021 (1+ %)
Religion	Number	Fraction
Roman Catholic Church	5924	54.43%
None	3589	32.98%
Not found out	784	7.2%
Evangelical Church	257	2.36%
Total	10,884	

In year 2021 was 10,884 people by religion 5924 from Roman Catholic Church, 3589 from None, 784 from Not found out, 257 from Evangelical Church, 56 from Greek Catholic Church, 44 from Ad hoc movements, 34 from Christian Congregations in Slovakia, 32 from Other, 31 from Other and not ascertained christian church, 25 from Jehovah's Witnesses, 23 from Paganism and natural spirituality, 22 from Eastern Orthodox Church, 15 from Calvinist Church, 15 from Apostolic Church, 8 from Buddhism, 7 from Islam, 5 from Czechoslovak Hussite Church, 4 from Jewish community, 2 from Hinduism, 2 from Seventh-day Adventist Church, 2 from Baptists Church, 1 from Old Catholic Church, 1 from United Methodist Church and 1 from Church of Jesus Christ of Latter-day Saints.

== Notable people ==
- Rastislav Blaško, former vice-chairman of Social Democratic Party of Slovakia, born in Ilava in 1971, lived in Nová Dubnica from 1979 to 1987. He is holder of twice bronze medal for 3rd place as the staff member of Slovak FootGolf National Team at the 2. European Team FootGolf Championship EURO FOOTGOLF 2019 in United Kingdom, England and 2021 in Hungary.
- Júlia Liptáková, Slovak model

== Interests ==
The cinema Panorex, which is used for organizing cultural events, was the first panoramic cinema in Slovakia.

== Twin towns — sister cities ==
Nová Dubnica is twinned with:

- Dubna, Russia
- Miedźna, Poland
- San Daniele del Friuli, Italy
- Slavičín, Czech Republic
