= Gmina Pawłowice =

Gmina Pawłowice Pawłowice Commune
- Gmina
- Coat of arms
- Interactive map of Gmina Pawłowice
- Coordinates (Pawłowice): 49°57′46″N 18°43′5″E
- Country: Poland
- Voivodeship: Silesian
- County: Pszczyna
- Seat: Pawłowice

Area
  - Total: 75.77 km^{2} (29.25 sq mi)

Population (2019-06-30)
  - Total: 18,171
  - Density: 239.8/km^{2} (621.1/sq mi)
- Website: http://www.pawlowice.pl

Gmina Pawłowice is a rural gmina (administrative district) in Pszczyna County, Silesian Voivodeship, in southern Poland. Its seat is the village of Pawłowice, which lies approximately 17 kilometres (11 mi) west of Pszczyna and 38 km (24 mi) south-west of the regional capital Katowice.

The gmina covers an area of 75.77 square kilometres (29.3 sq mi), and as of 2019 its total population is 18,171.

== Villages ==
Gmina Pawłowice contains the villages and settlements of Golasowice, Jarząbkowice, Krzyżowice, Pawłowice, Pielgrzymowice, Pniówek and Warszowice.

== Neighbouring gminas ==
Gmina Pawłowice is bordered by the towns of Jastrzębie-Zdrój and Żory, and by the gminas of Pszczyna, Strumień, Suszec and Zebrzydowice.

== Twin towns – sister cities ==
Gmina Pawłowice is twinned with:

- Perkupa, Hungary
- Teplička nad Váhom, Slovakia
- Verquin, France
