= Princely Pheasantry =

Coordinates: 49°59′23″N 18°53′34″E

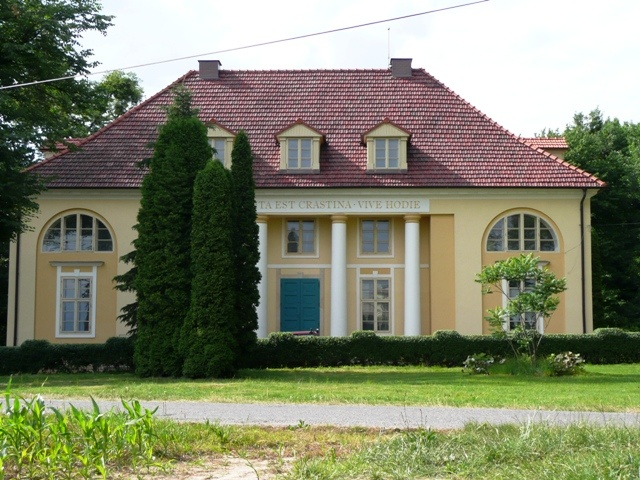
The Princely Pheasantry

The Princely Pheasantry is a late 18th-century neoclassical building in Poręba, Pszczyna County, Silesian Voivodeship, southern Poland. It was founded by the Prince of Pszczyna Frederick Erdmann, designed by Wilhelm Pusch and built between 1792 and 1800.

== History ==
=== 18th century ===
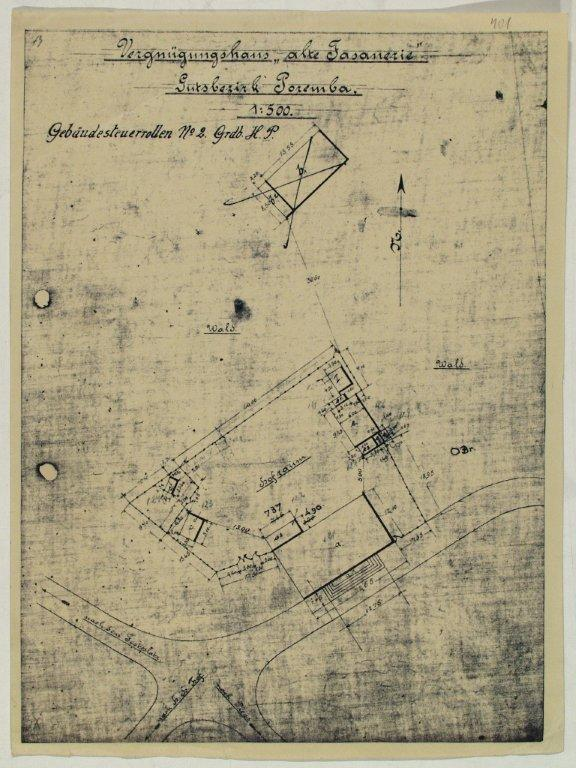
Map of the 18th century

The main residence of the owners of Pszczyna State Duchy was a castle at the north-west frontage of Pszczyna market. The castle burnt down in 1737. The reconstruction and extension of the destroyed building was carried out after the Pszczyna holdings were taken over by the family of Anhalt-Köthen (Catherine the Great came from Anhalt-Zerbst branch of this family). As a result, an impressive baroque residence was created. At the end of the 18th century, the Pheasantry in Poręba was constructed.

The idea of starting a farm devoted to raising pheasants arose in 1770. Steps were taken in order to obtain the necessary land. At first some plots of land belonging to peasants were repurchased, and later an extensive birch forest was added (thanks to an exchange of land made by the village leader Greycark). Through land reclamation processes, the water conditions were changed, creating ponds and streams as well as the system of roads and paths. With a planting scheme, the overall design was given to the composition of the park – forest landscaping. Through further exchanges of land with peasants, the land joining the future farm with the bordering road from Pszczyna to Żory was obtained. Having the land it was possible to realize the farming – landscape project provided by the princely architect W. Pusch. Some picturesque, crisscrossing tracks were created as well as outbuildings, a house for the pheasant keeper, and a wooden villa called "Henry’s Spring".

On the hill, slightly off the path on its ridge, Frederick Erdmann ordered the building of a summer house (Lustschloss), based on Pusch’s design, which was modeled on a previously published project by Carl Gotthard Langhans. Although there is no knowing of when precisely the construction began, we know exactly when the building was put into use – 25 June 1800. Only the castle itself, later called “Fasanerie” – The Pheasantry, has remained. Frederick Erdmann died in 1797 before his project was finalized, and the construction was completed by his son Frederick Ferdinand.

The Pheasantry is a typical classical building of a rectangular plan with a high, square hip roof, a bricked front facing south and a five-axis front elevation decorated with a four-pillar portico preceded by steps. In the 20th century the building was extended by adding a north-west wing. In the fringe parts of elevations you can find panels with windows: the bottom ones being rectangular and the upper ones semi-circular. The drawing-room has a ceiling with a facet and an orchestra and choir balcony is situated on the first floor level. The entrances and windows have flat frames with keystones. Until now a clear layout of the interior has been remained, that being two sections with a wide shallow entryway and a storied drawing room with bevel edges.

=== 19th century ===
In the 19th century additional buildings were constructed - the palace commonly known as the Palace of Prince Christian, Manor House Ludwikówka, Hunting Manor House (on Żorska Street) and the Hunting Castle in Promnice. In the Pszczyna archives there is a description of the interior. On the ground floor there was a hall with a table, chairs, bench and a desk; the storied drawing room had a balcony equipped with eight benches padded with black linen, a round sofa, two big mirrors, a chandelier, eleven wall candelabras and a round stove; the ladies' chamber had a sofa, six chairs, a table, a two-way mirror and a partition by the fireplace; a smoking room was equipped with a sofa and eleven reed chairs; and a billiard room. There were also a few rooms in the attic. The Poręba Palace was devoted mainly to entertainment.

In contrast to the dignified and formal interiors of Pszczyna Castle, the Pheasantry was a "true temple of fun and joy". The ballroom of the Pheasantry was decorated with festoons of fruit and numerous bouquets of flowers. Guests from the town and its environs were invited to balls organized to celebrate princely birthdays. A particularly ceremonious birthday party was organized for Princess Augustina Esperanza Fredericka von Reuss - Henry Anhalt’s wife (Henry Anhalt ruled the duchy in the years: 1818-1830 and 1841-1846) whose birthday coincided with that of King Frederick William III of Prussia. The Palace in Poręba and Pszczyna Castle were brightly lit for parties. The celebrations usually started at midday with a sumptuous dinner and numerous toasts, and after the dinner there was the partying which lasted well into the small hours. Plenty of toasts were proposed during the parties, accompanied by trumpets and drums. Up to 3,500 people took part in a single party.

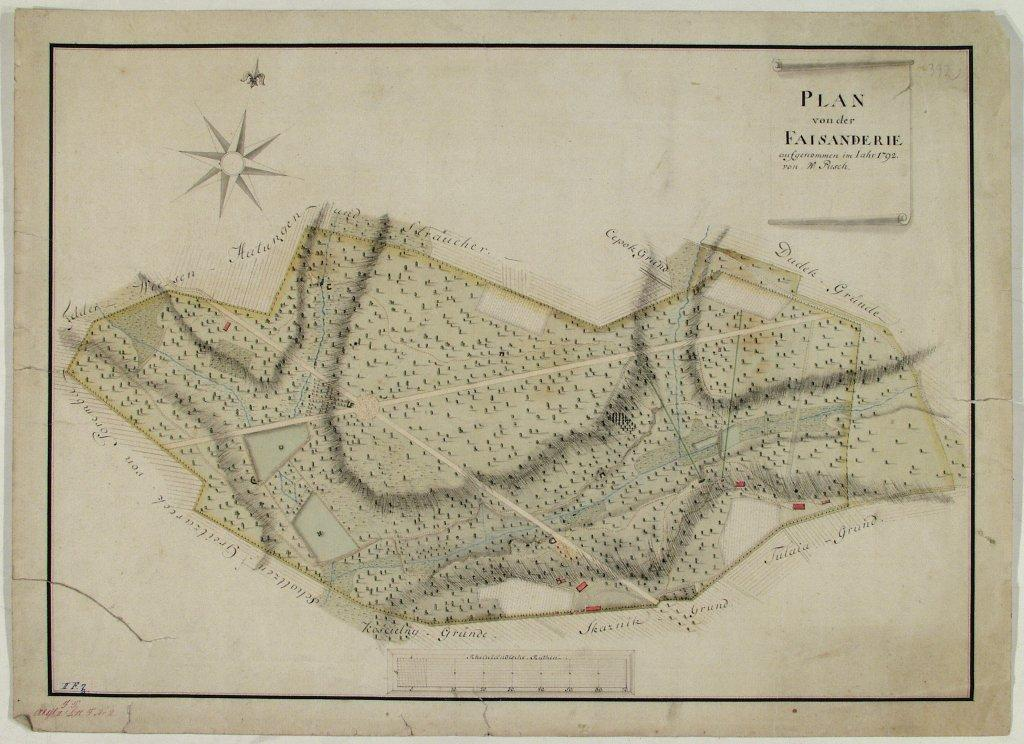
The plan of The Pheasantry from the 18th century

It must be assumed that the popularity of the Pheasantry was over with the death of the last member of the Anhalt family. After the reconstruction in 1870-1874 (already under Hochbergs ruling) formal parties took place in Pszczyna Castle.

=== 20th century ===
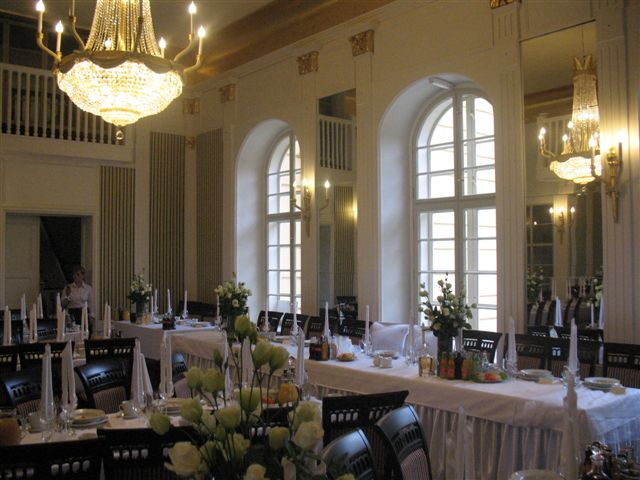
Hall

During World War I the General Staff of the German Imperial Army were based in Pszczyna (called "little Berlin" at the time). The Pheasantry was visited by the Emperor of Germany and many officials, who were enthusiastic consumers of the pheasants.

In 1922 Prince John Henry XV used the Pheasantry as an elegant inn that hosted such figures as Polish President Ignacy Mościcki, Deputy Prime Minister Eugeniusz Kwiatkowski, and the elite of Silesia and Warsaw. Winter sports were practiced in the surrounding park, including skiing, ski jumping and ice-skating; while in the summer it was used for running, cycling and horse riding. It was a popular weekend destination before the new road to Bielsko-Biała was built. In 1937 John Henry XV sold the palace and the building continued to be an inn. Towards the end of World War II it was used as a regimental headquarters for the Wehrmacht. During the war and after the Pheasantry also housed workers from the former princely properties.

On 20 January 1965 the Pheasantry was listed on the national register of historic monuments (No. A/504/65). In the 1970s "Pniówek" coalmine took it over and used it for housing. The annexes were demolished and the interiors renovated to the basic style of the 1970s. The building served as a pub and held such events as the Miners' Day celebrations.

=== 21st century ===
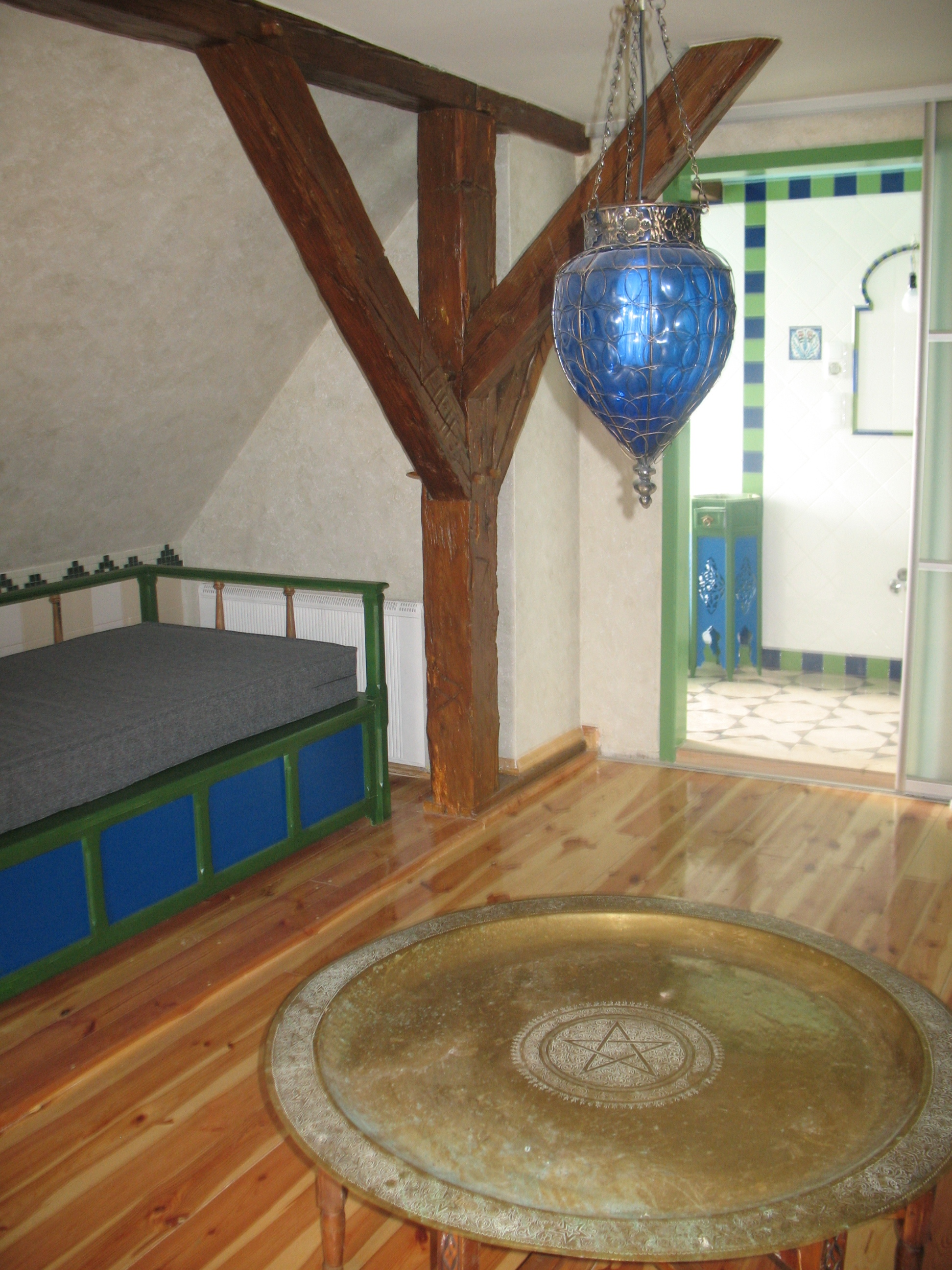
Arabic style room

Having completed the restoration in 2011, the new owners opened the renovated building to the public and returned it to its original function. On the ground floor you can find a big ball room with dining room and dining facilities that can hold over 100 guests. Upstairs there is a capacious conference room and three apartments. It is located within a natural park, and owned by the State Forests. It is a popular destination for cyclists and hikers.
