= Gilowice, Pszczyna County =

Gilowice
- Village
- Location within Poland
- Coordinates: 49°59′35″N 19°5′46″E
- Country: Poland
- Voivodeship: Silesian
- County: Żywiec
- Gmina: gilowice
- Population: 1,170
- Website: http://www.miedzna.pl/gilowice.php

Gilowice [ɡilɔˈvit͡sɛ] is a village in the administrative district of Gmina Miedźna, within Pszczyna County, Silesian Voivodeship, in southern Poland.
