= Góra, Silesian Voivodeship =

Góra
- Village
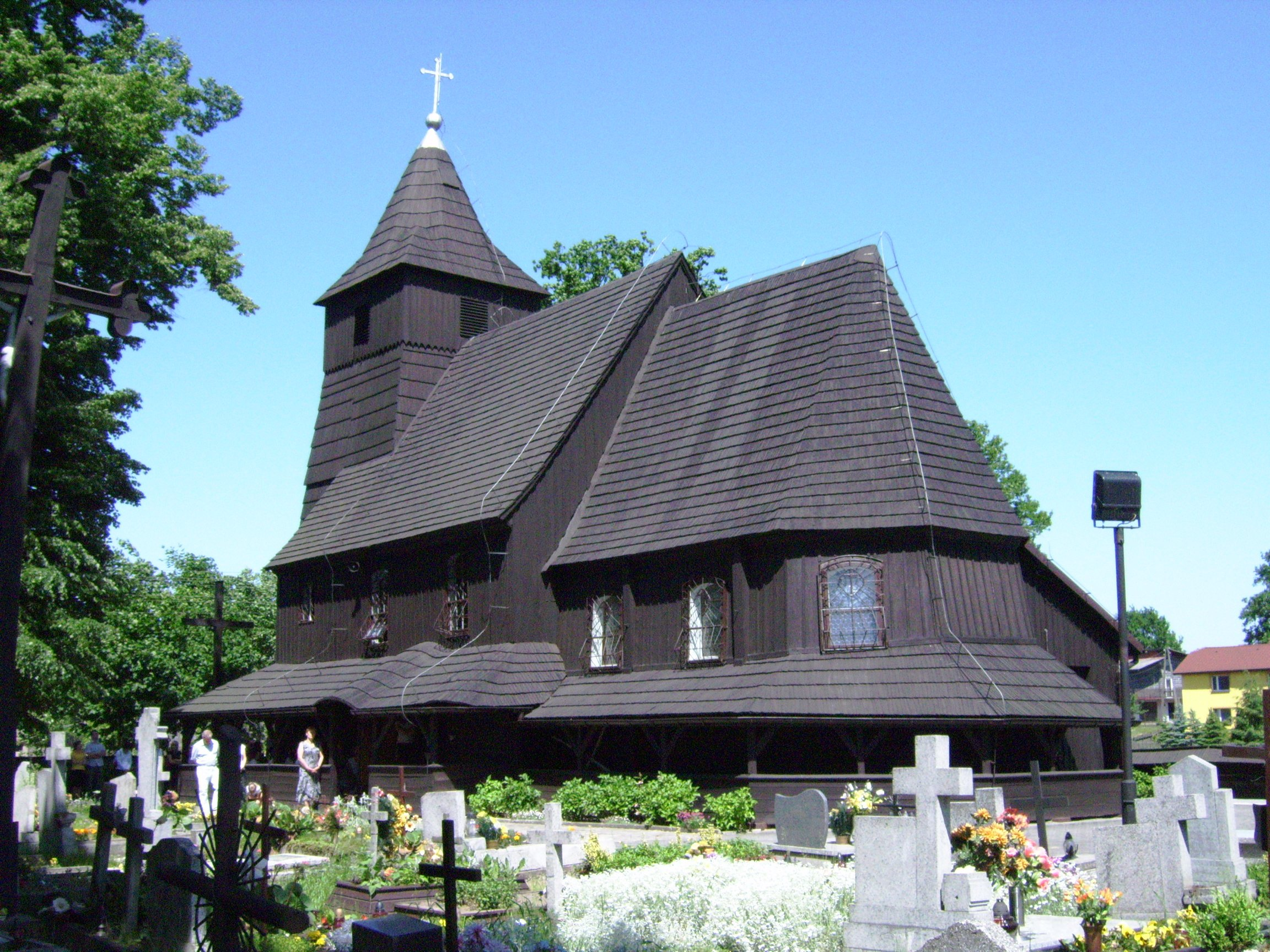
- A local Catholic church

- Location within Poland
- Coordinates: 49°58′25″N 19°6′34″E
- Country: Poland
- Voivodeship: Silesian
- County: Pszczyna
- Gmina: Miedźna

Population
  - Total: 2,554
- Time zone: UTC+1 (CET)
  - Summer (DST): UTC+2 (CEST)

Góra [ˈɡura] is a village in the administrative district of Gmina Miedźna, within Pszczyna County, Silesian Voivodeship, in southern Poland.

The name of the village is of Polish origin and means "hill".
