= Krzyżowice, Silesian Voivodeship =

Krzyżowice
- Village
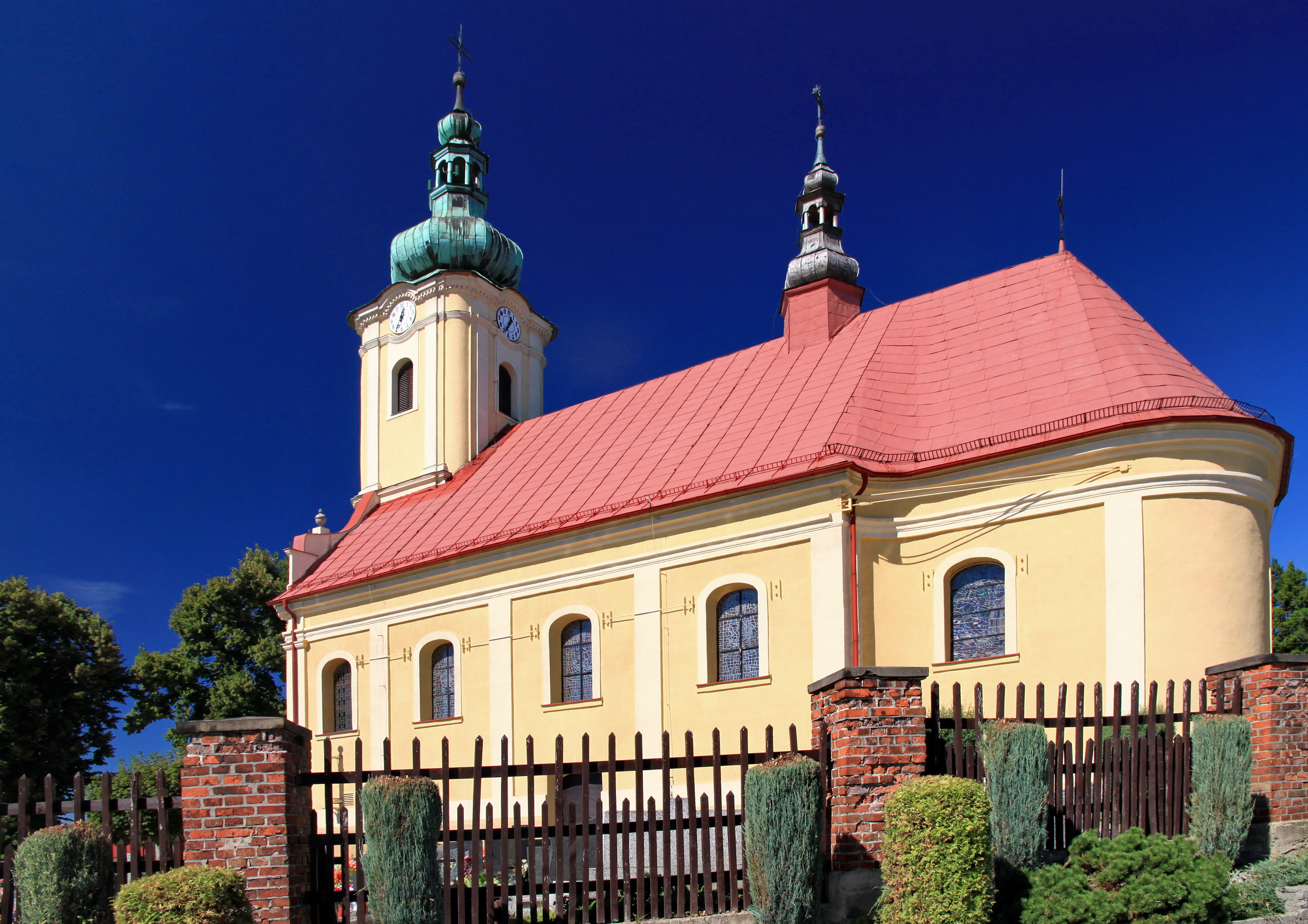
- Saint Michael Archangel Church

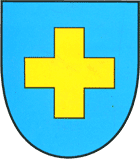
- Coat of arms

- Location within Poland
- Coordinates: 49°59′8″N 18°40′22″E
- Country: Poland
- Voivodeship: Silesian
- County: Pszczyna
- Gmina: Pawłowice
- First mentioned: ca. 1305
- Area: 986 km^{2} (381 sq mi)
- Population: 1,028
  - Density: 1.04/km^{2} (2.70/sq mi)

Krzyżowice [kʂɨʐɔˈvit͡sɛ] is a village in the administrative district of Gmina Pawłowice, within Pszczyna County, Silesian Voivodeship, in southern Poland.

== History ==
The village was first mentioned in a Latin document of Diocese of Wrocław called Liber fundationis episcopatus Vratislaviensis from around 1305 as item in Grisowitz debent esse septuaginta minus uno mansi. The creation of the village was a part of a larger settlement campaign taking place in the late 13th century on the territory of what will be later known as Upper Silesia.

Politically the village belonged initially to the Duchy of Racibórz, since 1327 a fee of the Kingdom of Bohemia. During the political upheaval caused by Matthias Corvinus the land around Pszczyna was overtaken by Casimir II, Duke of Cieszyn, who sold it in 1517 to the Hungarian magnates of the Thurzó family, forming the Pless state country. In the accompanying sales document issued on 21 February 1517 the village was mentioned as Krziziowicze. The Kingdom of Bohemia in 1526 became part of the Habsburg monarchy. In the War of the Austrian Succession most of Silesia was conquered by the kingdom of Prussia, including the village. After World War I and Upper Silesia plebiscite it became a part of Silesian Voivodeship, Second Polish Republic. It was then annexed by Nazi Germany at the beginning of World War II. After the war it was restored to Poland.
