= Miedźna =

- Village
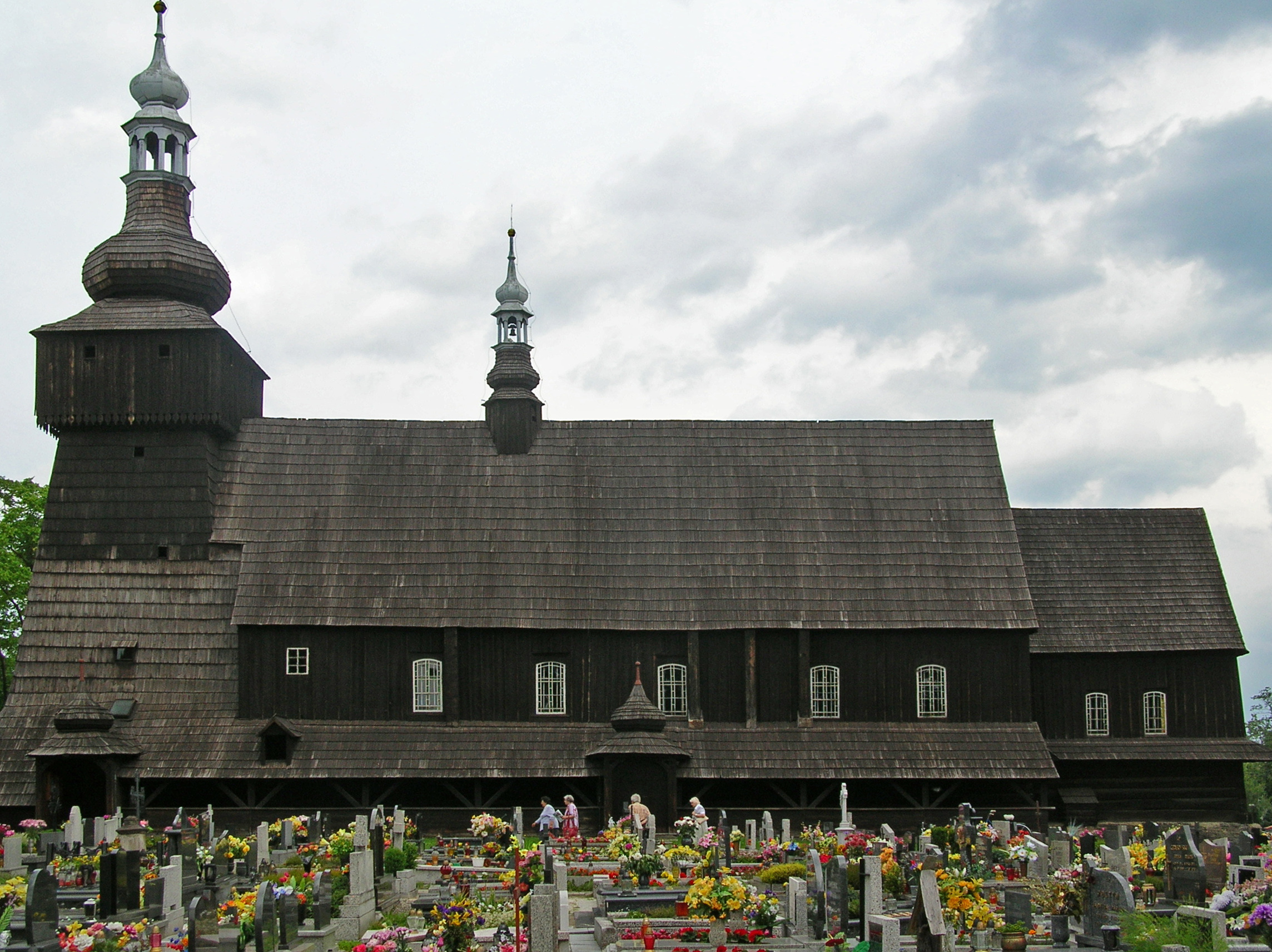
- Saint Clemens church

- Location within Poland
- Coordinates: 49°59′N 19°3′E
- Country: Poland
- Voivodeship: Silesian
- County: Pszczyna
- Gmina: Miedźna

Population
  - Total: 1,576
- Time zone: UTC+1 (CET)
  - Summer (DST): UTC+2 (CEST)
- Postal code: 43-227
- Vehicle registration: SPS
- Website: http://www.miedzna.pl/

Miedźna [ˈmʲɛd͡ʑna] is a village in Pszczyna County, Silesian Voivodeship, in southern Poland. It is the seat of the gmina (administrative district) called Gmina Miedźna.

== History ==
In the Middle Ages, the area was part of the territory of the Vistulans tribe, one of the Polish tribes. It became part of the emerging Polish state in the 10th century. As a result of the fragmentation of Poland, it was part of the Polish Seniorate Province and Duchy of Racibórz. The village was first mentioned in 1326 in the register of Peter's Pence payment among Catholic parishes of Oświęcim deaconry of the Diocese of Kraków under two names: Medzwna seu Cuncendorf.

Afterwards, the village passed under Bohemian (Czech) suzerainty, and in the 15th century, it became part of the newly formed Duchy of Pszczyna. During the political upheaval caused by Matthias Corvinus the duchy was overtaken in 1480 by Casimir II, Duke of Cieszyn from the Piast dynasty, who sold it in 1517 to the Hungarian magnates of the Thurzó family, forming the Pless state country. In the accompanying sales document issued on 21 February 1517 the village was mentioned as Medna. Along with the Kingdom of Bohemia in 1526, it became part of the Habsburg monarchy. In the War of the Austrian Succession most of Silesia was conquered by the Kingdom of Prussia, including the village, and in 1871 it became part of the German Empire. After World War I, Poland regained independence, and following the subsequent Polish Silesian Uprisings against Germany, the village was reintegrated with the reborn Polish state.

Following the German-Soviet invasion of Poland, which started World War II in September 1939, Miedźna was occupied by Germany until 1945. The local Polish police chief was murdered by the Russians in the Katyn massacre in 1940. In January 1945, a German-perpetrated death march from the Auschwitz concentration camp passed through Miedźna, and 42 prisoners, including 29 women and several children were buried in the village.
