= Pawłowice, Pszczyna County =

Pawłowice
- Village
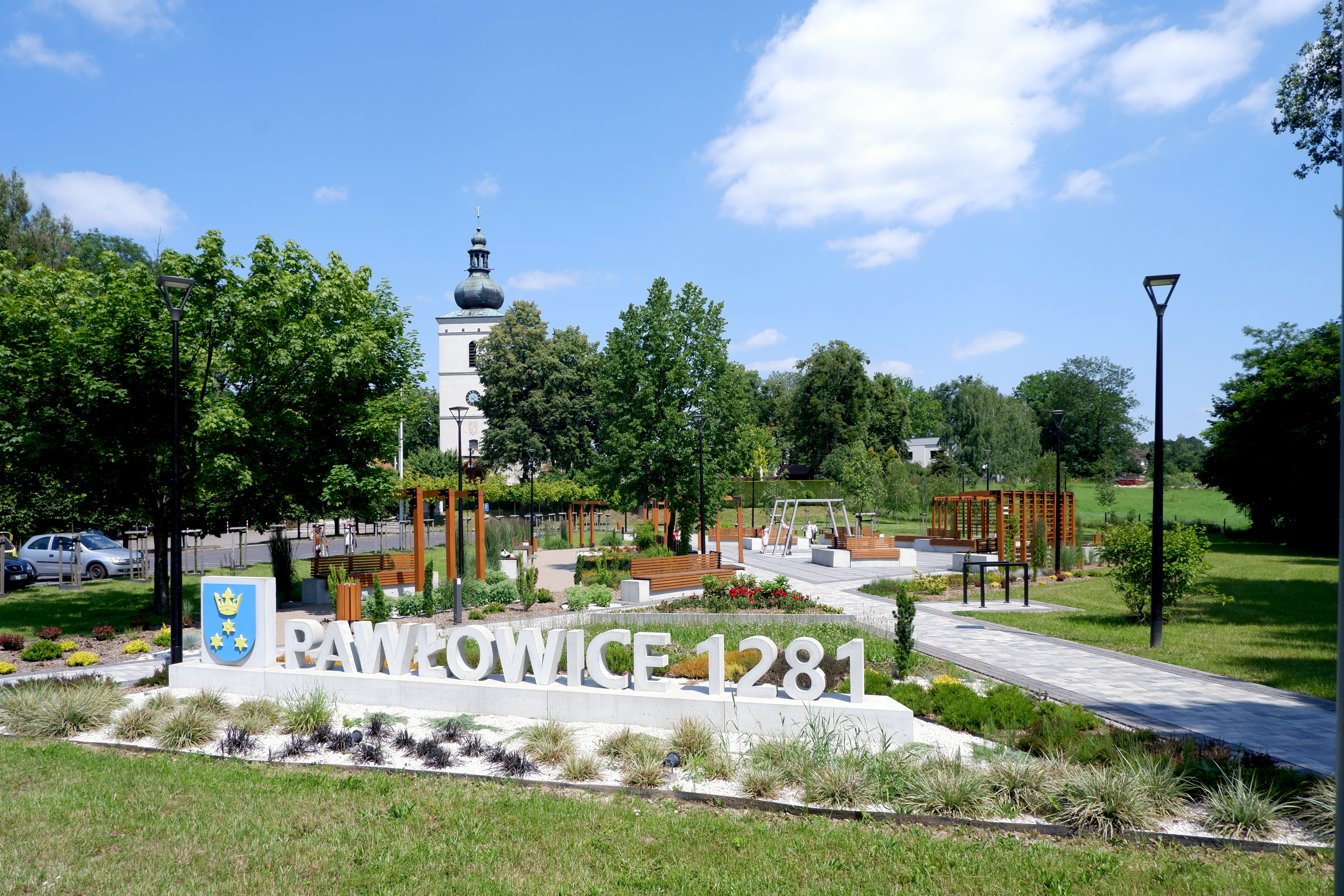

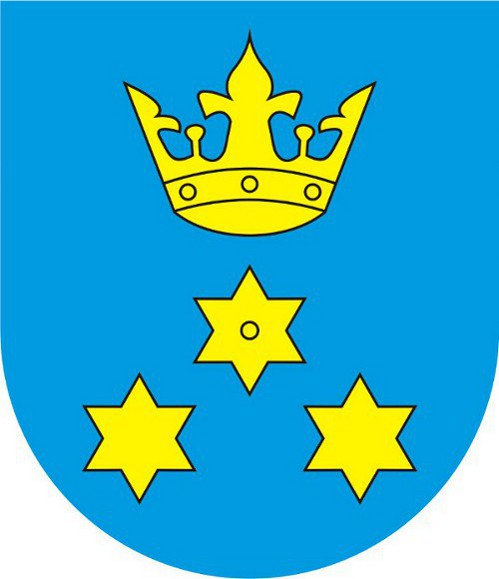
- Coat of arms

- Location within Poland
- Coordinates: 49°57′46″N 18°43′5″E
- Country: Poland
- Voivodeship: Silesian
- County: Pszczyna
- Gmina: Pawłowice
- First mentioned: 1281

Area
  - Total: 18.05 km^{2} (6.97 sq mi)

Population
  - Total: 9,929
  - Density: 550.1/km^{2} (1,425/sq mi)
- Time zone: UTC+1 (CET)
  - Summer (DST): UTC+2 (CEST)
- Postal codes: 43-250 and 43-251
- Vehicle registration: SPS
- Website: http://www.pawlowice.pl

Pawłowice [pavwɔˈvit͡sɛ] is a large village in Pszczyna County, Silesian Voivodeship, in southern Poland. It is the seat of the gmina (administrative district) called Gmina Pawłowice.

== History ==
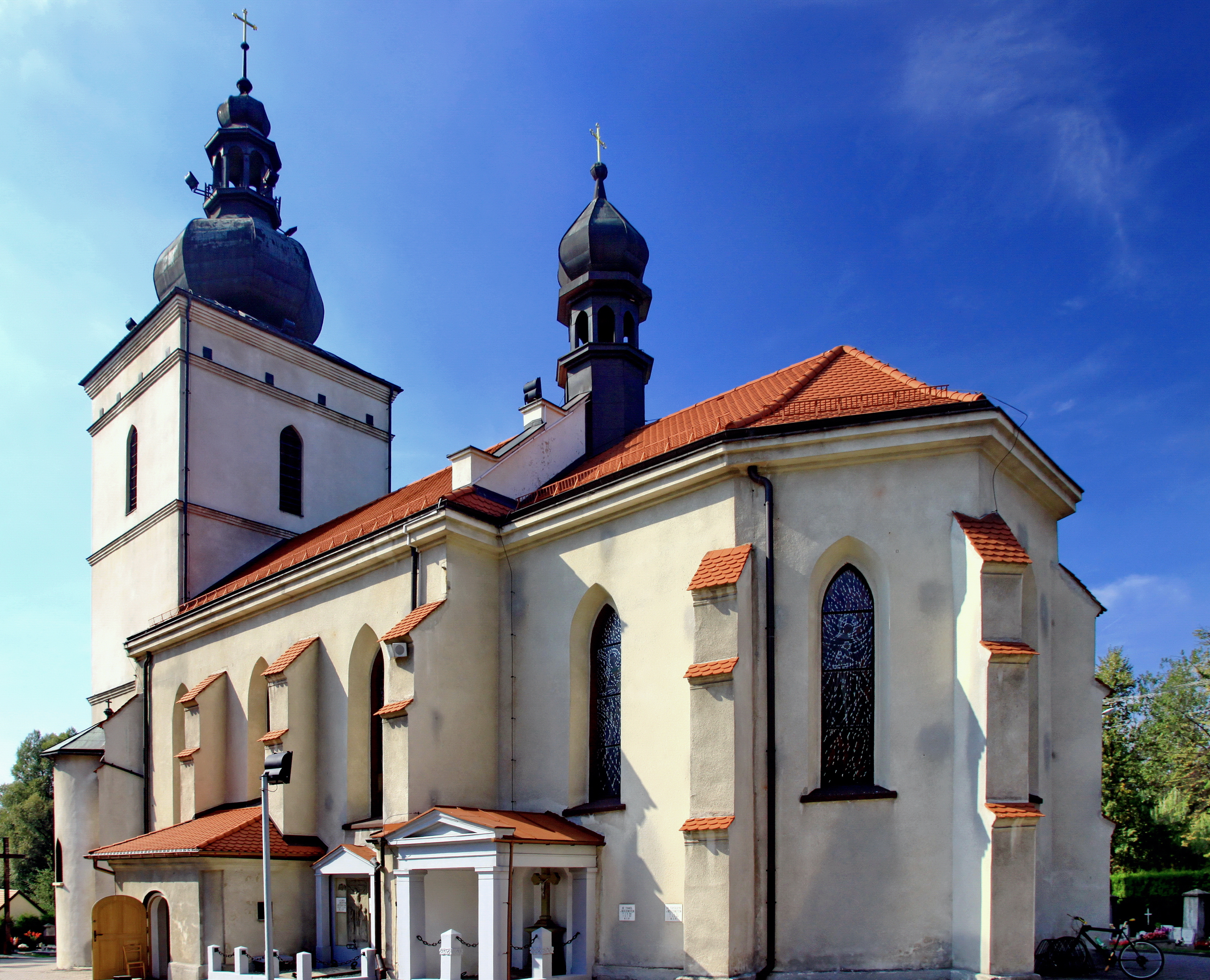
Saint John the Baptist church

The village was first mentioned in 1281, when it was part of medieval Piast-ruled Poland.

During the political upheaval caused by Matthias Corvinus the land around Pszczyna was overtaken by Casimir II, Duke of Cieszyn, who sold it in 1517 to the Hungarian magnates of the Thurzó family, forming the Pless state country. In the accompanying sales document issued on 21 February 1517 the village was mentioned as Pawlowicze. The Kingdom of Bohemia in 1526 became part of the Habsburg monarchy. In the War of the Austrian Succession most of Silesia was conquered by the Kingdom of Prussia, including the village, but Pawłowice, however, were mostly inhabited by Poles. In the Upper Silesia plebiscite in 1921, as many as 74% of the inhabitants of Pawłowice voted for rejoining Poland. In 1922, Pawłowice was incorporated into the reborn Poland.

Following the German-Soviet invasion of Poland, which started World War II in September 1939, Pawłowice was occupied by Germany until 1945. The local Polish police chief and four other policemen were murdered by the Russians in the Katyn massacre in 1940.
