= BKM =

BKM can refer to:

- Bangladesh Khelafat Majlish
- Belkommunmash, a Belarusian manufacturer of trolleybus and trams
- Berkhamsted railway station, Hertfordshire, England (National Rail station code)
- Best Known Method, an industry synonym for Best practice
- Bezpłatna Komunikacja Miejska in Żory, free city transport in Żory, Poland
- BKM algebra, a Lie algebra in mathematics
- BKM algorithm for computing elementary functions based on complex exponentials and logarithms
- Boutokaan Kiribati Moa Party, Kiribati political party
- Buckinghamshire in England — BKM is the Chapman code for that county.
- Federal Government Commissioner for Culture and the Media (German: Beauftragter der Bundesregierung für Kultur und Medien, BKM)
- Kom language (ISO 639-3 code of a language spoken in Cameroon)
- Bergvliet, Kreupelbosch, and Meadowridge, a group of three interrelated, affluent neighborhoods in the Southern Suburbs region of Cape Town
