= Boguszowice Stare =

- Rybnik District
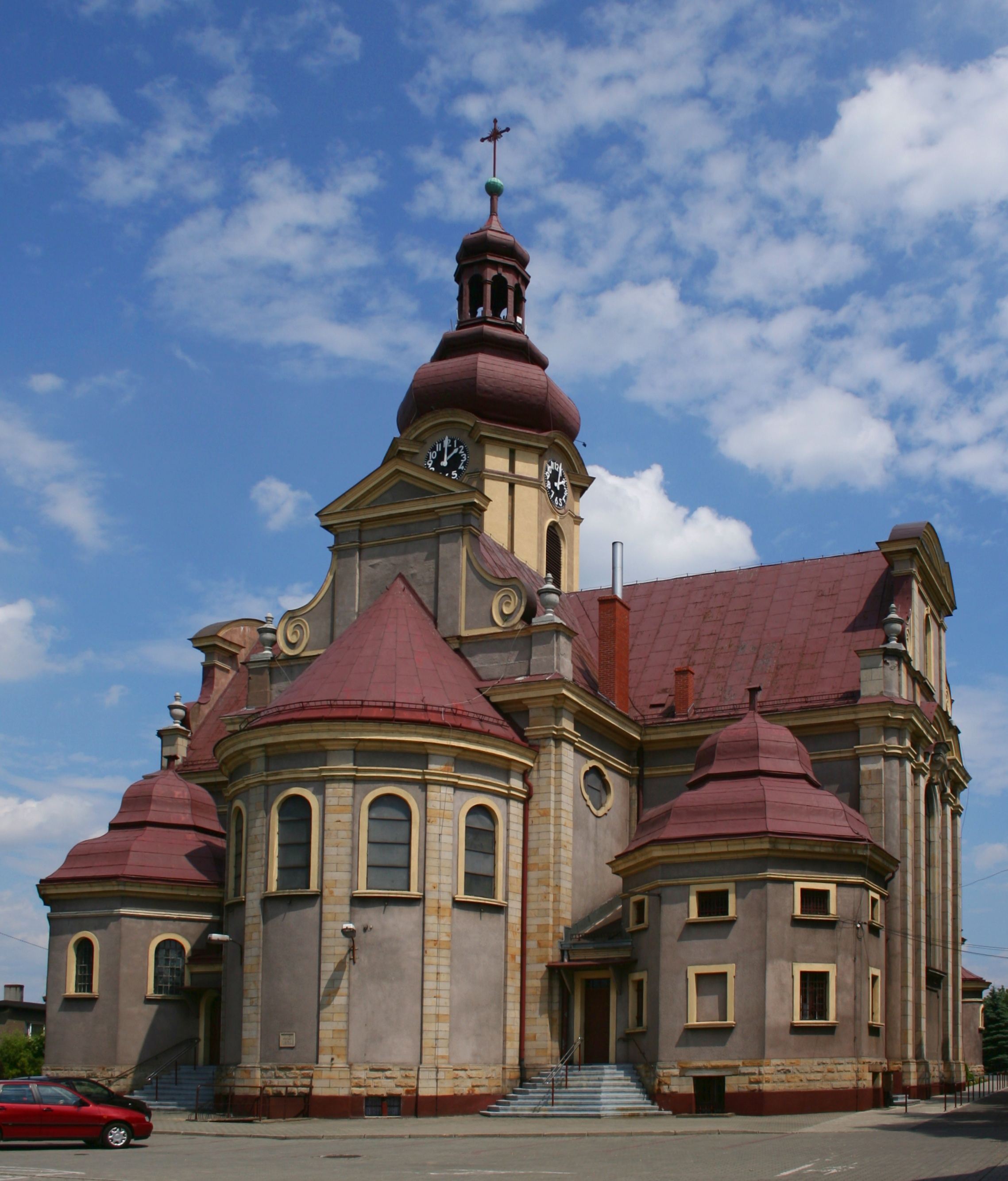
- Sacred Heart church

- Coat of arms

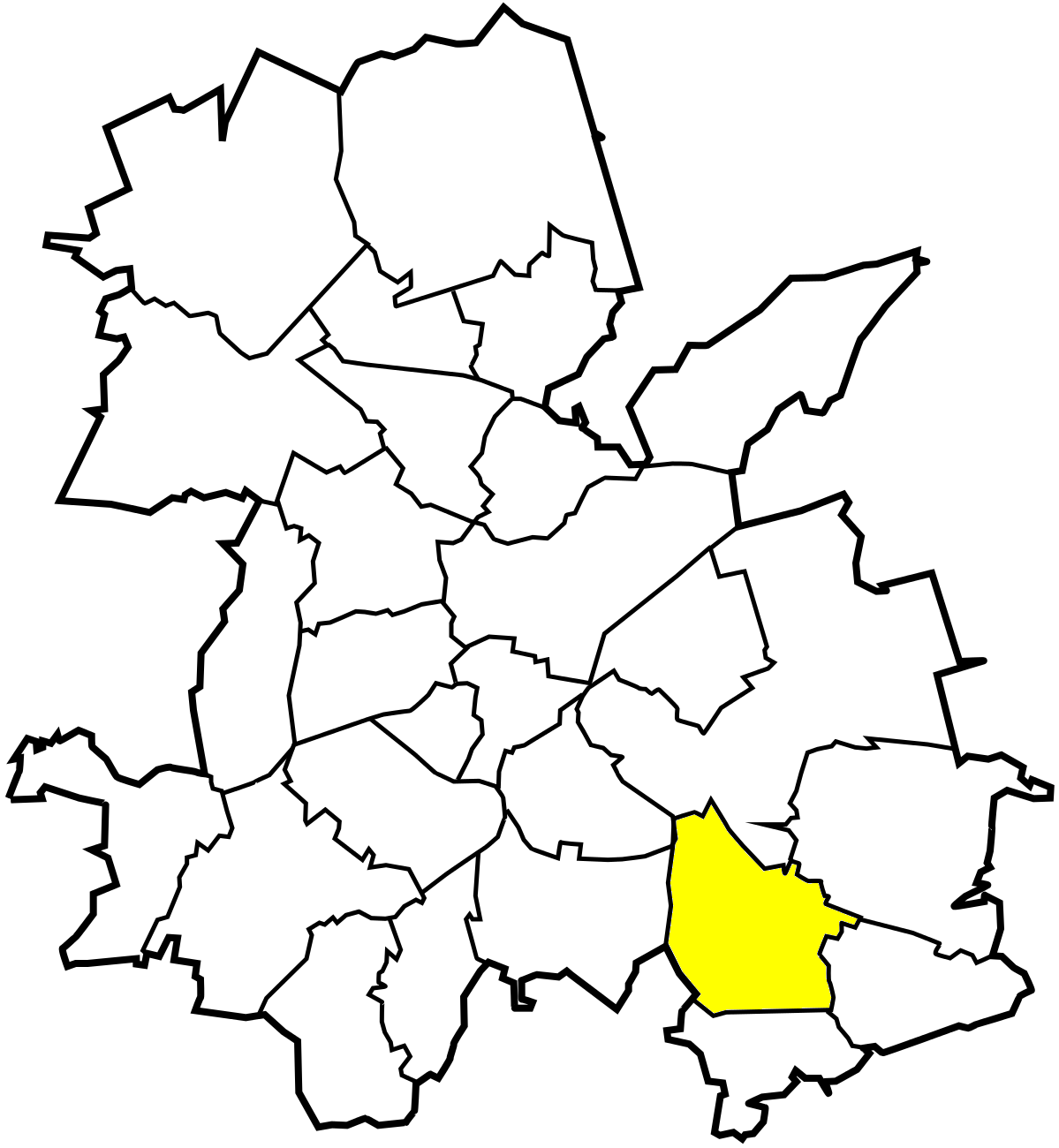
- Location of Boguszowice Stare within Rybnik
- Coordinates: 50°03′N 18°36′E
- Country: Poland
- Voivodeship: Silesian
- County/City: Rybnik

Population (2013)
  - Total: 7,700
- Time zone: UTC+1 (CET)
  - Summer (DST): UTC+2 (CEST)
- Area code: (+48) 032

Boguszowice Stare (German: Boguschowitz) is a district of Rybnik, Silesian Voivodeship, southern Poland. In the late 2013 it had about 7,700 inhabitants.

Boguszowice, existing from the Middle Ages, was an urban-type settlement and in years 1962-1975 a separate town. Stare, meaning literally Old, was added in 1975 when Boguszowice was amalgamated with Rybnik and split to form its two separate districts:

- Boguszowice Stare, encompassing the oldest part of the settlement, including the Sacred Heart church;
- Boguszowice Osiedle, consisting of large working class housing estates;

== History ==
The village was mentioned in a Latin document of Diocese of Wrocław called Liber fundationis episcopatus Vratislaviensis from around 1305 as item Bogussovitz solvit decimam more polonico et valet tres marcas. The village was certainly older and was a seat of a Catholic parish in Żory deanery of Diocese of Wrocław, established probably in the second half of the 13th century, first mentioned in 1335 as Boguslavicz in an incomplete register of Peter's Pence payment composed by Galhard de Carceribus.

Politically the village belonged initially to the Duchy of Opole and Racibórz, within feudally fragmentated Poland, ruled by a local branch of the Silesian Piast dynasty. In 1327 the Upper Silesian duchies became a fee of the Kingdom of Bohemia, which after 1526 became part of the Habsburg monarchy. After Silesian Wars it became a part of the Kingdom of Prussia.

After World War I in the Upper Silesia plebiscite 586 out of 723 voters in Boguszowice voted in favour of joining Poland, against 134 opting for staying in Germany. In 1922 it became a part of Silesian Voivodeship, Second Polish Republic. They were then annexed by Nazi Germany at the beginning of World War II. After the war it was restored to Poland.

In years 1945-1954 it was a seat of a gmina, encompassing also Gotartowice, Folwarki, Kłokocin, Rowień and Rój. On November 13, 1954 it became an urban-type settlement, later on August 18, 1962 it gained town rights. The town absorbed Kłokocin and Gotartowice. On May 27, 1975 it was amalgamated with Rybnik.
