= Rowień-Folwarki =

- Żory District
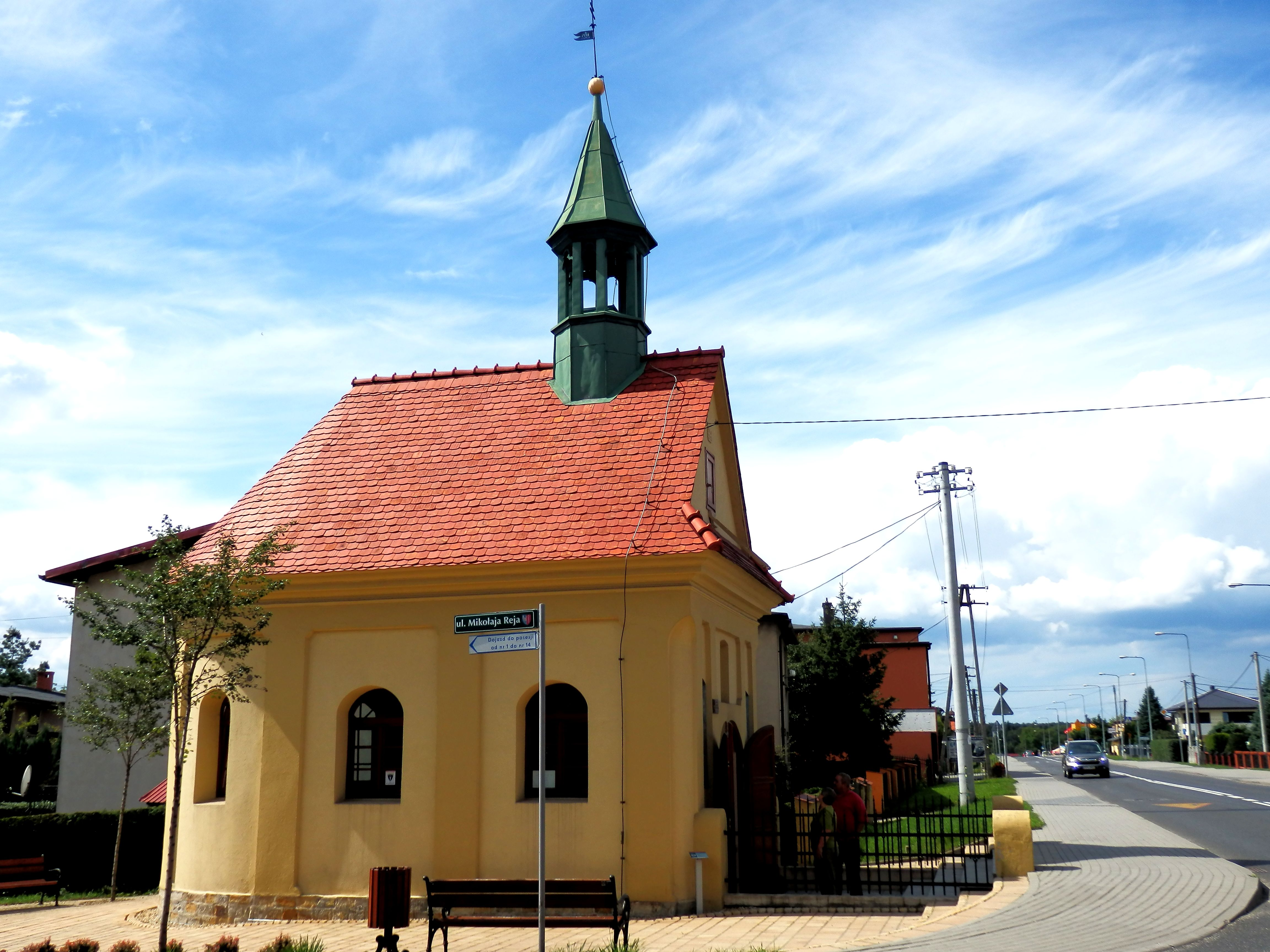
- Chapel in Rowień

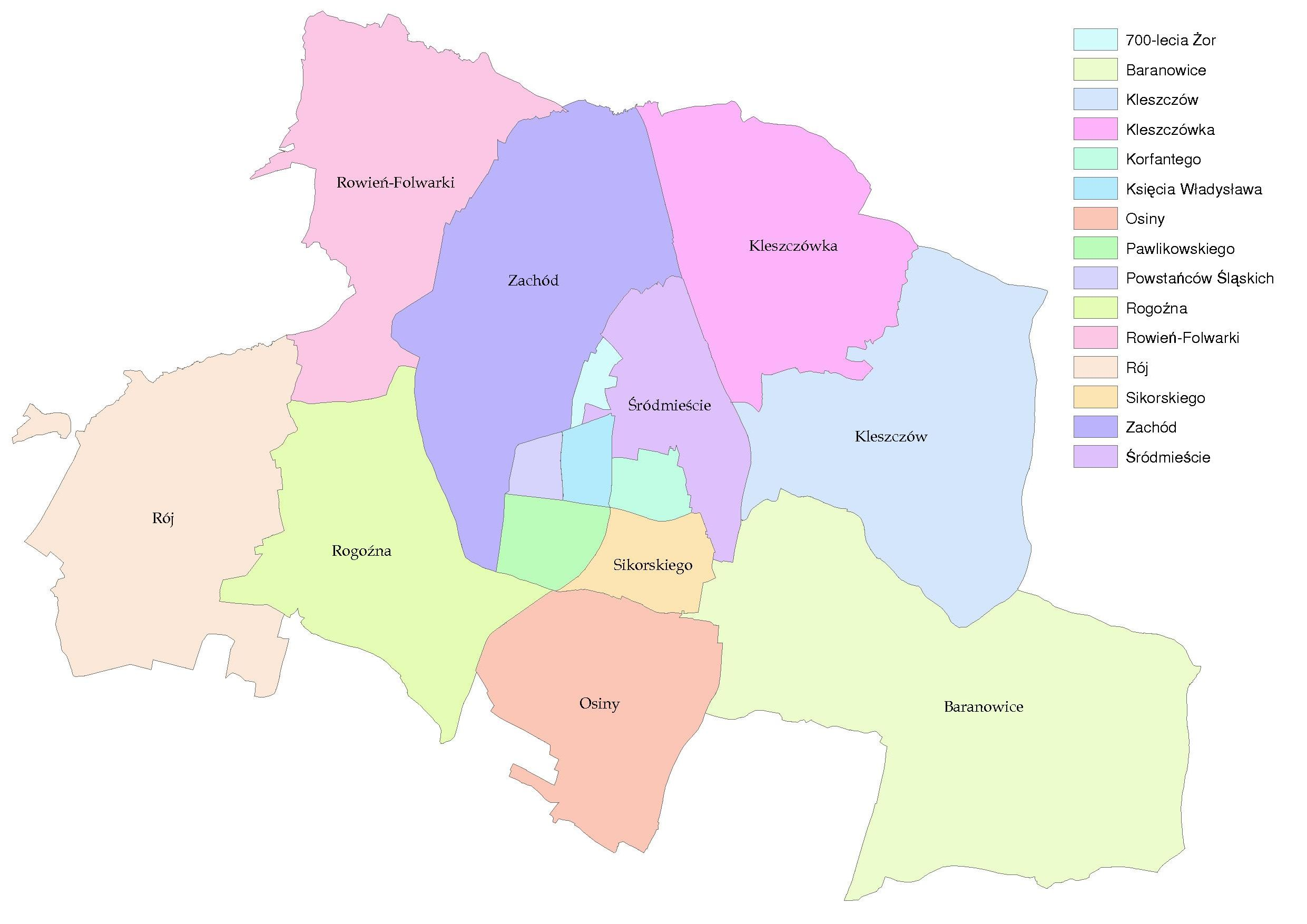
- Location of Rowień-Folwarki within Żory
- Coordinates: 50°04′02.204″N 18°39′13.338″E
- Country: Poland
- Voivodeship: Silesian
- County/City: Żory

Area
  - Total: 6.1884 km^{2} (2.3894 sq mi)

Population (2013)
  - Total: 1,927
  - Density: 311.4/km^{2} (806.5/sq mi)
- Time zone: UTC+1 (CET)
  - Summer (DST): UTC+2 (CEST)
- Area code: (+48) 032
- Website: www.rowien-folwarki.zory.pl

Rowień-Folwarki (German: Rowin) is a district in the north-west of Żory, Silesian Voivodeship, southern Poland. It has an area of 6.1884 km^{2} and in January, 2013 had 1,927 inhabitants.

It encompasses two former settlements:

- Rowień (German: Rowin)
- Folwarki (plural form of folwark, German: Vorbriegen)

== History ==
Rowień was first mentioned in a Latin document of Diocese of Wrocław called Liber fundationis episcopatus Vratislaviensis from around 1305 as item in Rovona decima solvitur more polonico et valet I) marcas. Folwarki evolved later, but was tied with Rowień.

After World War I in the Upper Silesia plebiscite 374 out of 407 voters in Rowień voted in favour of joining Poland, against 33 opting for staying in Germany, whereas in Folwarki (Vorbriegen) it was 59 out of 73 against 14.

In years 1945-1954 both villages were a part of gmina Boguszowice.
