= Rogoźna =

- Żory District
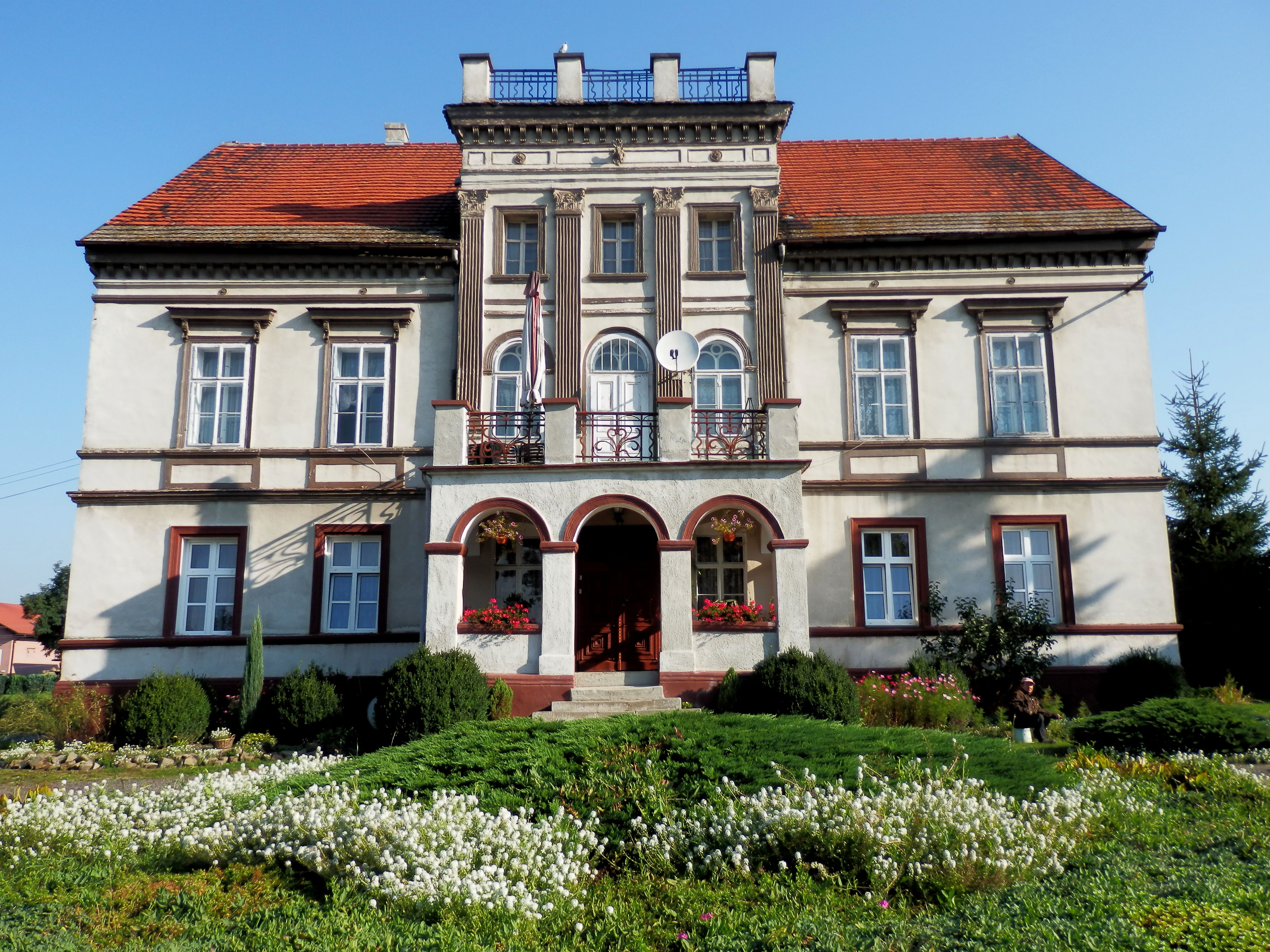
- A building, registered as a cultural monument

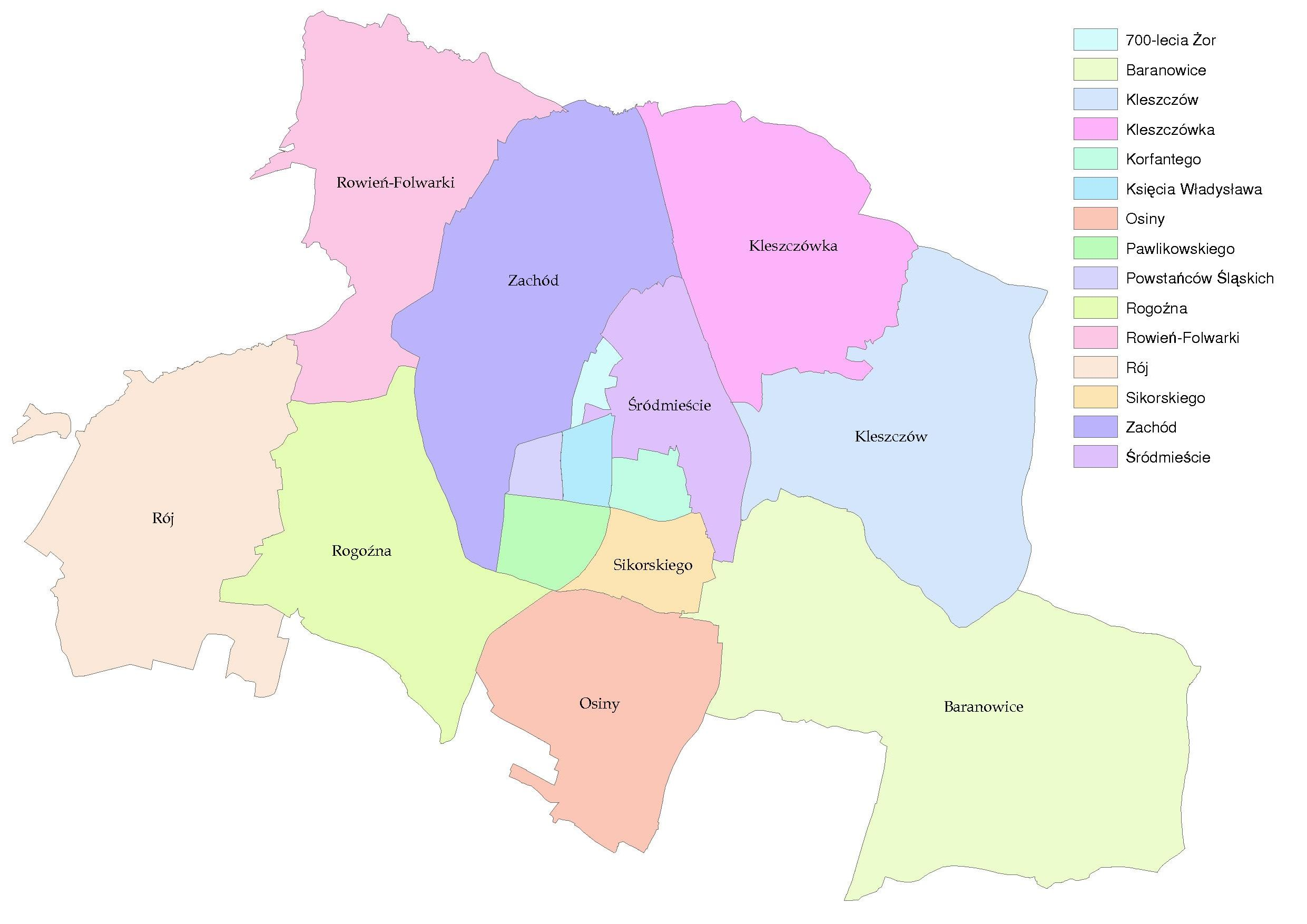
- Location of Rogoźna within Żory
- Coordinates: 50°02′06.713″N 18°39′19.832″E
- Country: Poland
- Voivodeship: Silesian
- County/City: Żory
- Time zone: UTC+1 (CET)
  - Summer (DST): UTC+2 (CEST)
- Area code: (+48) 032
- Website: http://www.rogozna.zory.pl/

Rogoźna (German: Rogoisna) is a district in the south-west of Żory, Silesian Voivodeship, southern Poland, built near the provincinal road no. 932

== History ==
Rogoźna was first mentioned in a Latin document of Diocese of Wrocław called Liber fundationis episcopatus Vratislaviensis from around 1305 as item in Rogosina in una parte decima solvitur more polonico, valet fertonem, in alia parte [que] locatur iure theuthonico habet libertatem.

After World War I in the Upper Silesia plebiscite 240 out of 292 voters in Rogoźna voted in favour of joining Poland, against 49 opting for staying in Germany.
