= Kłokocin =

- Rybnik District
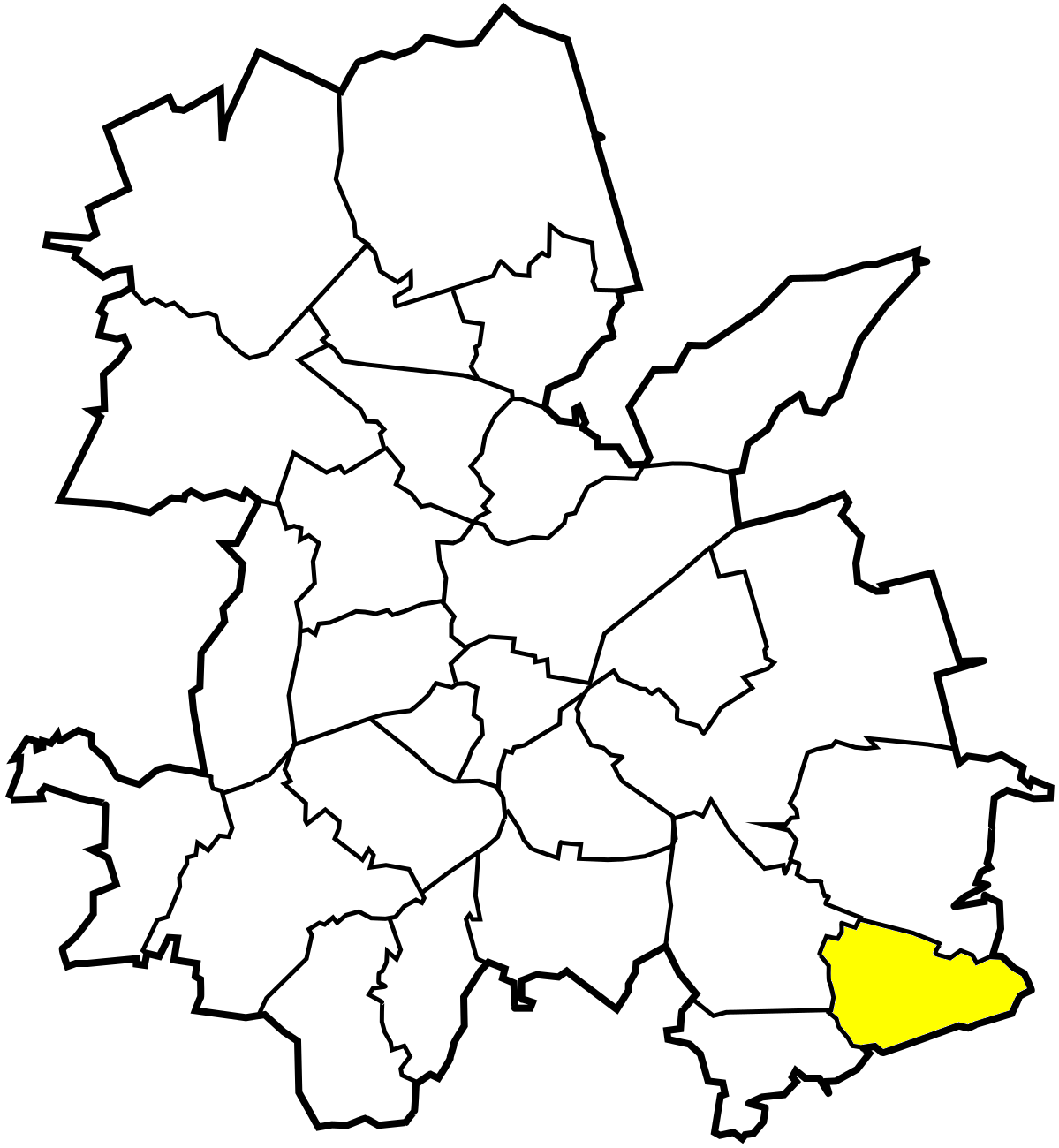
- Location of Kłokocin within Rybnik
- Coordinates: 50.055089°N 18.625819°E
- Country: Poland
- Voivodeship: Silesian
- County/City: Rybnik

Population (2013)
  - Total: 2,550
- Time zone: UTC+1 (CET)
  - Summer (DST): UTC+2 (CEST)
- Area code: (+48) 032
- Website: http://www.klokocin.eu/

Kłokocin (German: Klokotschin) is a district of Rybnik, Silesian Voivodeship, southern Poland. In late 2013, it had about 2,550 inhabitants.

== History ==
The village was mentioned in a Latin document of the Diocese of Wrocław called Liber fundationis episcopatus Vratislaviensis from around 1305 as item in Clocochina decima more polonico.

Politically, it belonged initially to the Duchy of Racibórz, within feudally fragmentated Poland, ruled by a local branch of the Silesian Piast dynasty. In 1327, the Upper Silesian duchies became a fee of the Kingdom of Bohemia, which after 1526 became part of the Habsburg monarchy. After the Silesian Wars, it became a part of the Kingdom of Prussia.

After World War I, in the Upper Silesia plebiscite, 259 out of 281 voters in Kłokocin voted in favour of joining Poland, against 22 opting for staying in Germany. In 1922, it became a part of the Silesian Voivodeship, Second Polish Republic. They were then annexed by Nazi Germany at the beginning of World War II. After the war, it was restored to Poland.

In the years 1945-1954, it was a part of the gmina Boguszowice, in 1962 it was absorbed by the town of Boguszowice and as part of it, was on May 27, 1975, amalgamated with Rybnik.
