= Baranowice (Żory) =

- Żory District
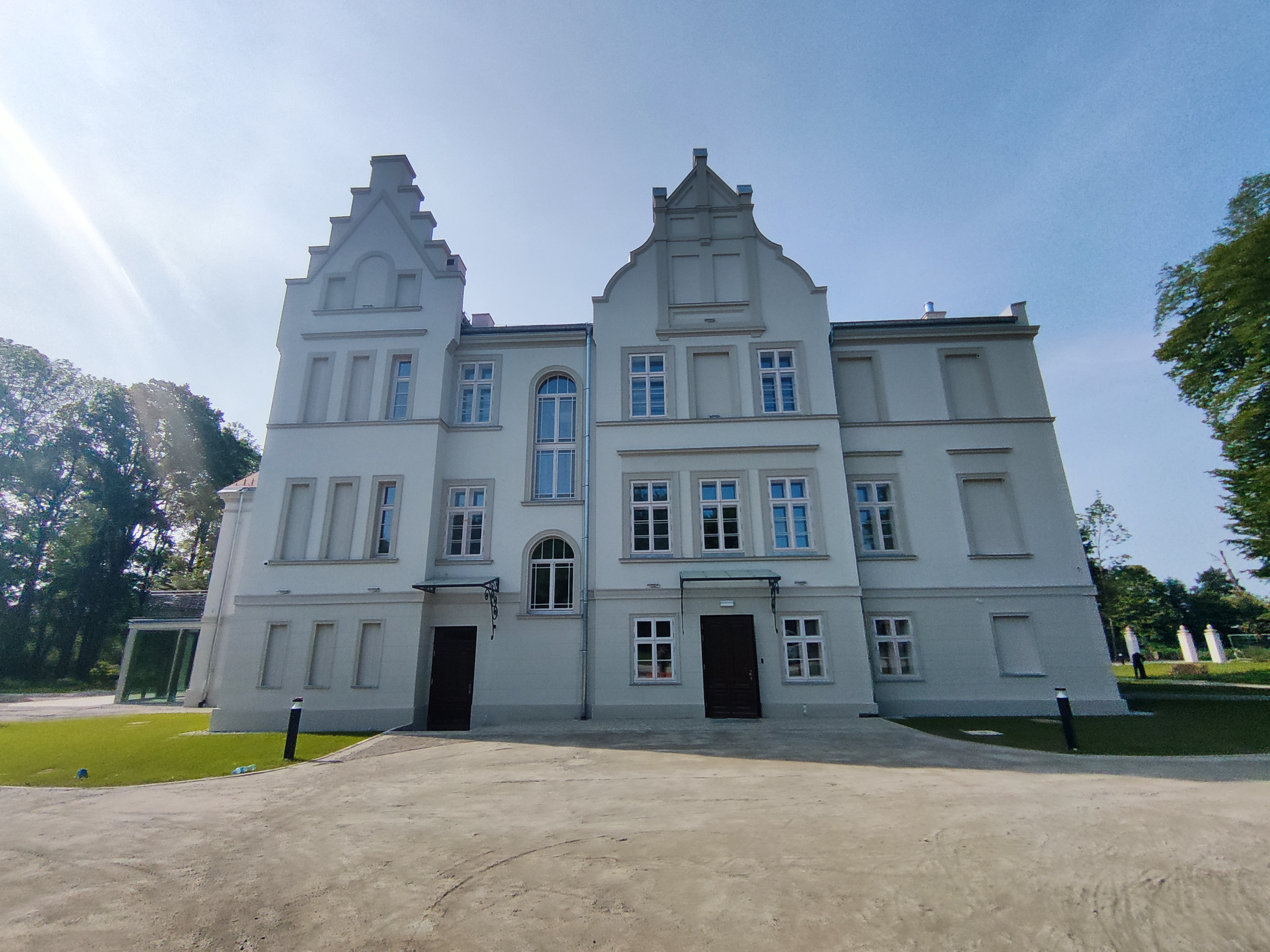
- 19th-century palace in Baranowice

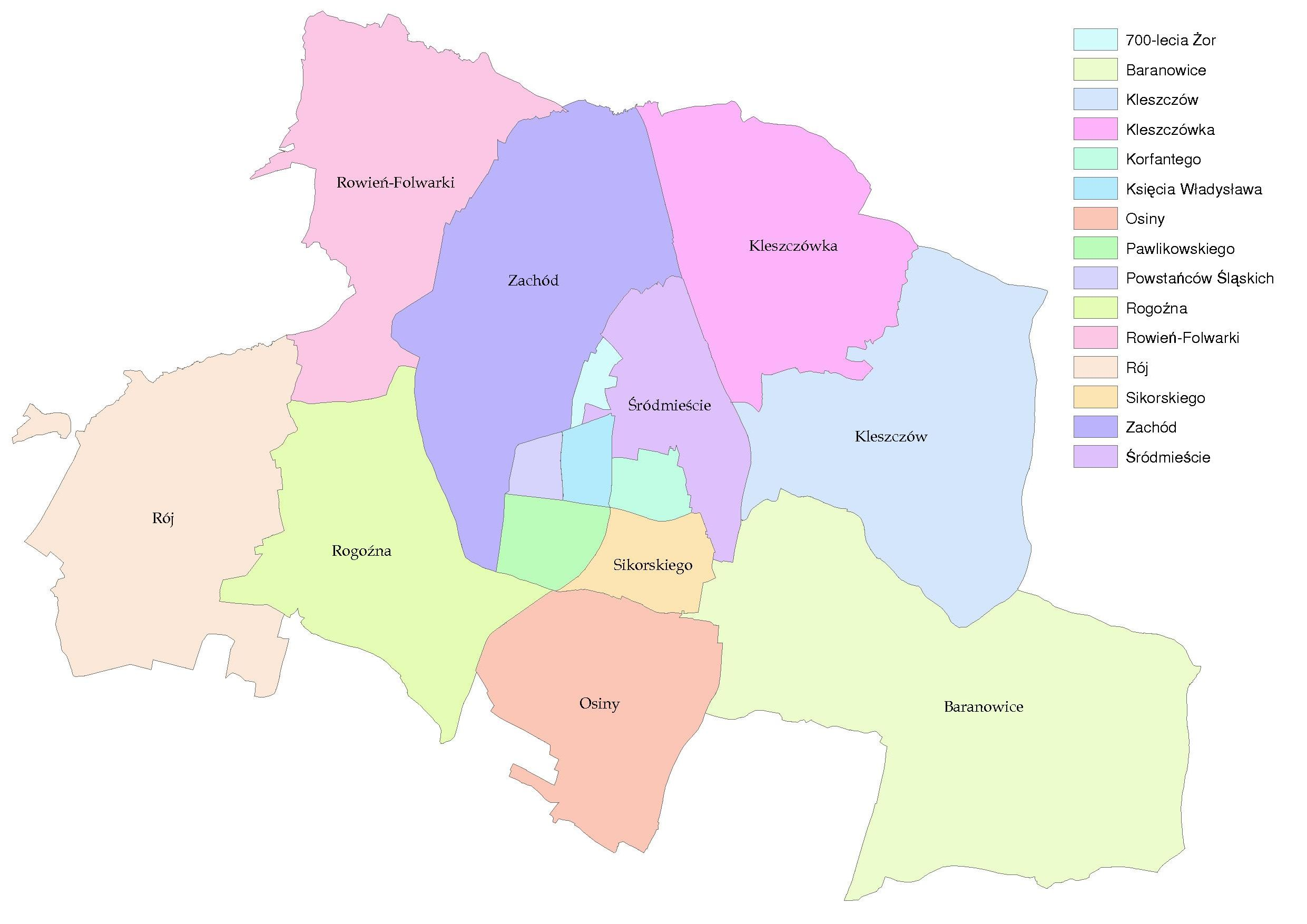
- Location of Baranowice within the municipality of Żory

- Location of Baranowice in Poland
- Coordinates: 50°01′07.65″N 18°43′08″E
- Country: Poland
- Voivodeship: Silesian
- County/City: Żory
- Within city limits: 1975

Area
  - Total: 12.91 km^{2} (4.98 sq mi)
- Time zone: UTC+1 (CET)
  - Summer (DST): UTC+2 (CEST)
- Area code: (+48) 032
- Website: Municipality Zory, District Baranowice

Baranowice (German: Baranowitz) is a rural district (dzielnica) in the municipality of Żory, in the Silesian Voivodeship, southern Poland, located in the south-eastern part of the city. Baranowice encompasses an area of 1,291 hectares and is the largest of all the districts of Żory.

== History ==
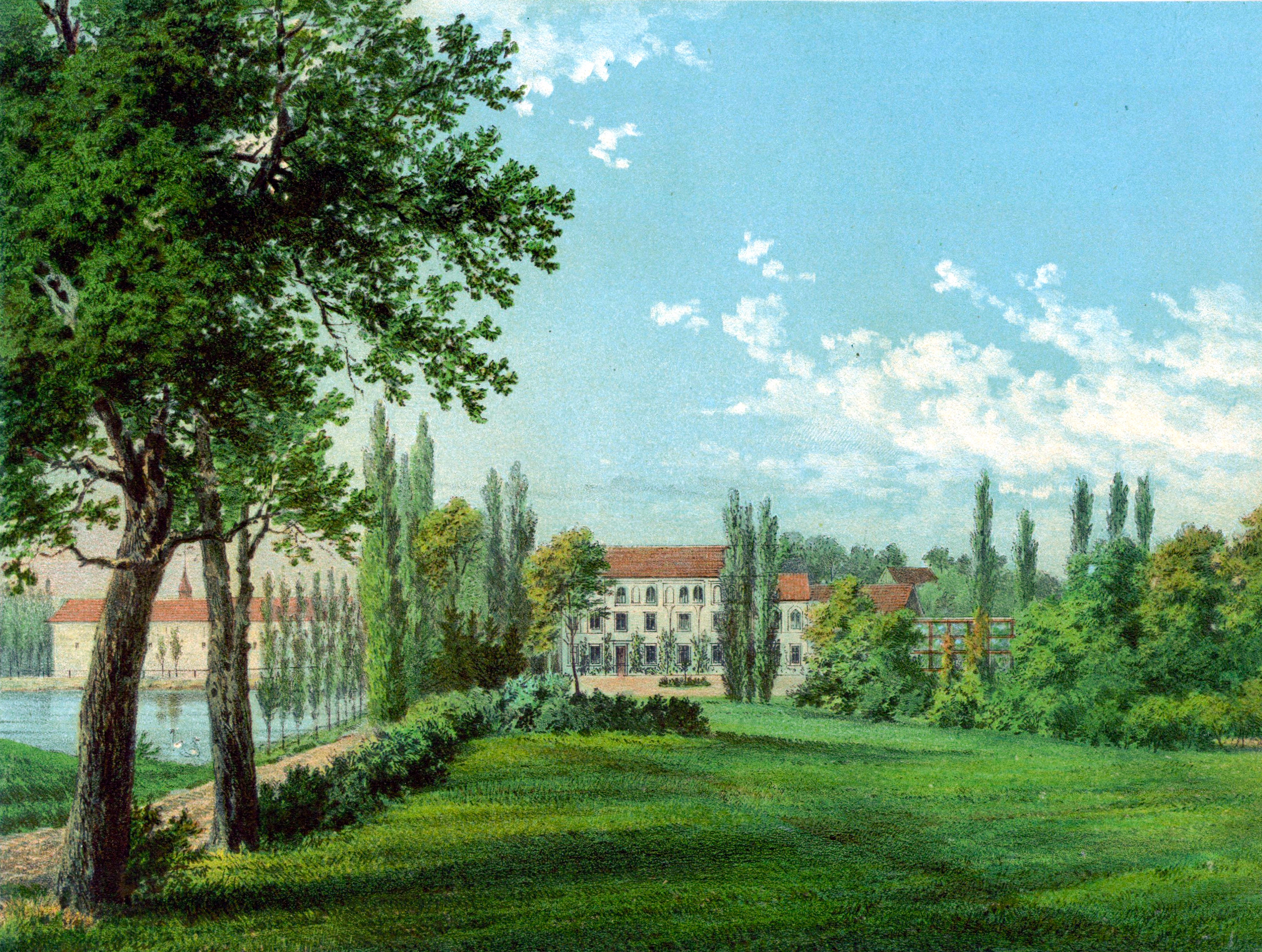
19th-century lithograph of the palace and park

The rural district of Baranowitz (Baranowice) was documented in 1436 as being purchased by the Silesian nobleman Nicholaus Szassowski von Szassow (also written as Saszowski von Saszow) and his wife Catherina for 80 Mark. They acquired the rural district from the nobleman Mikundey von Jaikowitz. Baranowitz remained under the ownership of the House of Saszowski estates until 1540, when it was sold to the Osinski family. In 1556, the Osinskis sold Baranowitz to Johann von Trach Brzezie of Alt-Gleiwitz.

After World War I in the Upper Silesia plebiscite 176 out of 214 voters in Baranowice voted in favour of joining Poland, against 38 opting to remain in Germany.

Up until 1945, and between 1973 and 1975, it constituted an independent rural district. It was included within the city limits of Żory in 1975.

== See also ==
wikimapia: Map of district Baranowice
