= Gotartowice =

- Rybnik District
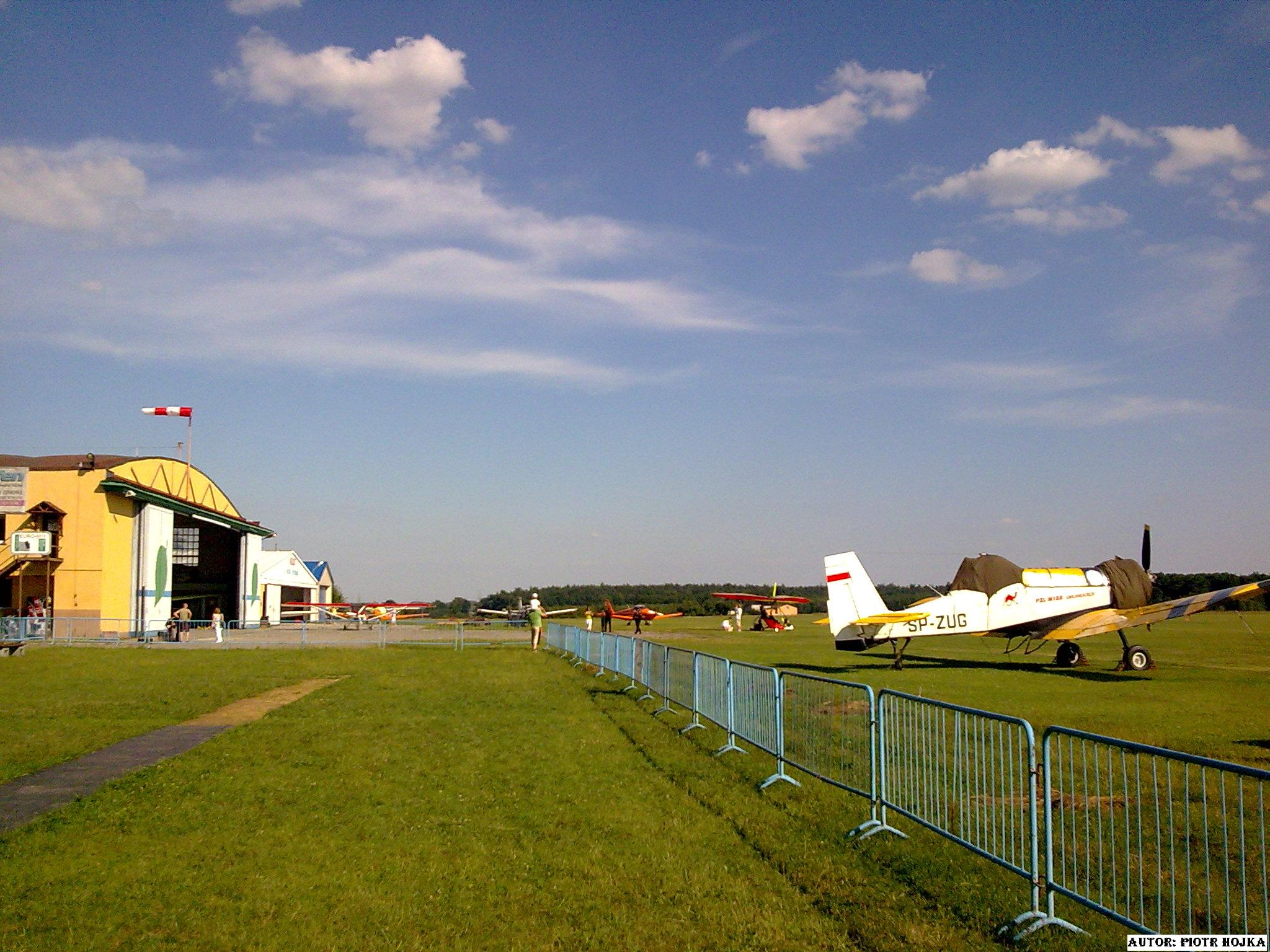
- Airfield in Gotartowice

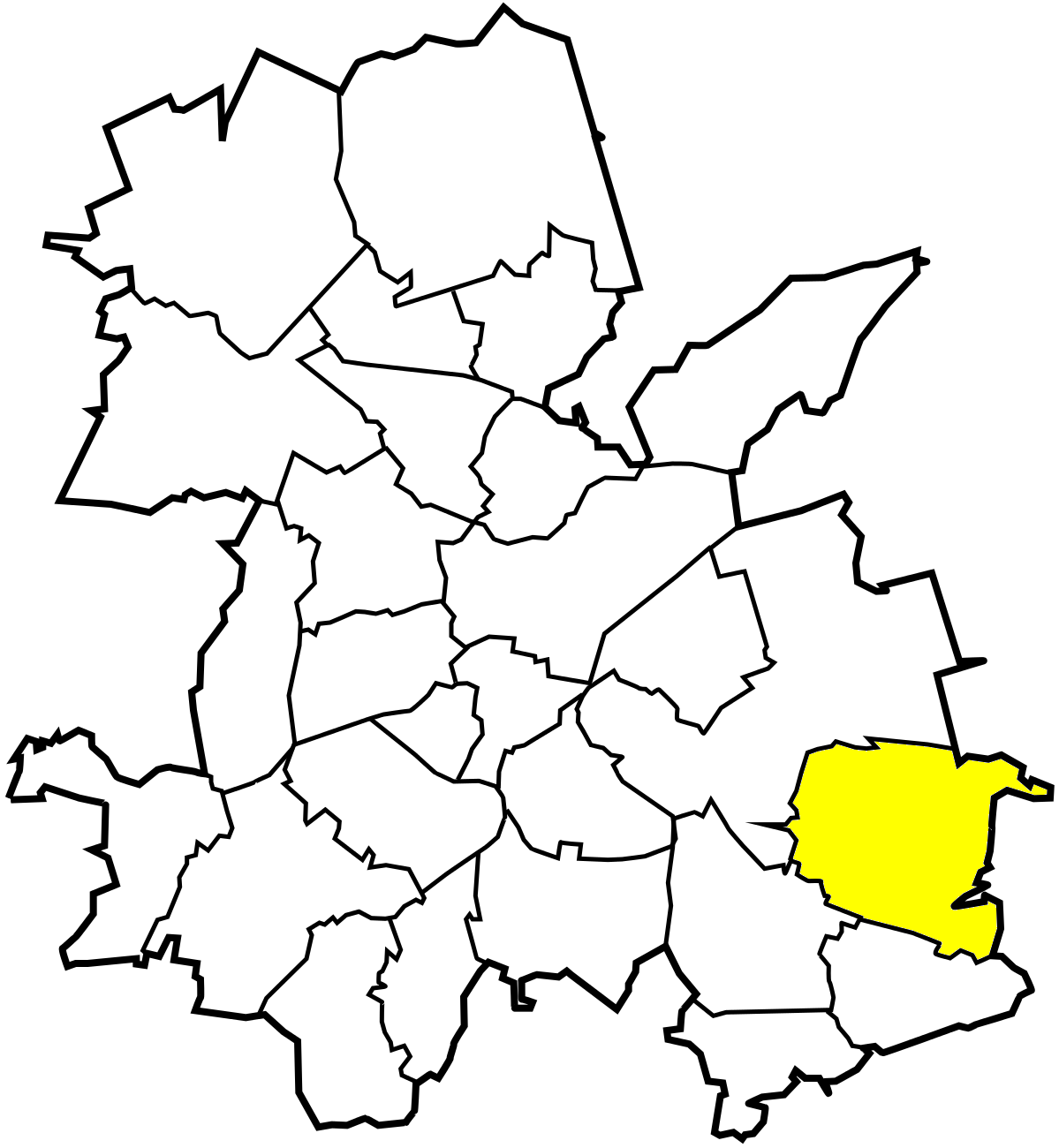
- Location of Gotartowice within Rybnik
- Coordinates: 50.077849°N 18.618272°E
- Country: Poland
- Voivodeship: Silesian
- County/City: Rybnik

Population (2013)
  - Total: 3,550
- Time zone: UTC+1 (CET)
  - Summer (DST): UTC+2 (CEST)
- Area code: (+48) 032

Gotartowice (German: Gotartowitz) is a district of Rybnik, Silesian Voivodeship, southern Poland. In the late 2013 it had about 3,550 inhabitants.

== History ==
The village could have been established in the late 13th century, supposedly by a local knight named Gothard, appearing in documents in the 1290s. The village was first mentioned in a Latin document of Diocese of Wrocław called Liber fundationis episcopatus Vratislaviensis from around 1305 as item in Gothartovitz decima solvitur more polonico.

Politically the village belonged initially to the Duchy of Opole and Racibórz, within feudally fragmentated Poland, ruled by a local branch of the Silesian Piast dynasty. In 1327 the Upper Silesian duchies became a fee of the Kingdom of Bohemia, which after 1526 became part of the Habsburg monarchy. After Silesian Wars it became a part of the Kingdom of Prussia.

After World War I in the Upper Silesia plebiscite 469 out of 534 voters in Gotartowice voted in favour of joining Poland, against 65 opting for staying in Germany. In 1922 it became a part of Silesian Voivodeship, Second Polish Republic. They were then annexed by Nazi Germany at the beginning of World War II. After the war it was restored to Poland.

In years 1945-1954 it was a part of gmina Boguszowice, in 1962 it was absorbed by the town Boguszowice and as part of it, was on May 27, 1975 amalgamated with Rybnik.
