= Rój =

- Żory District
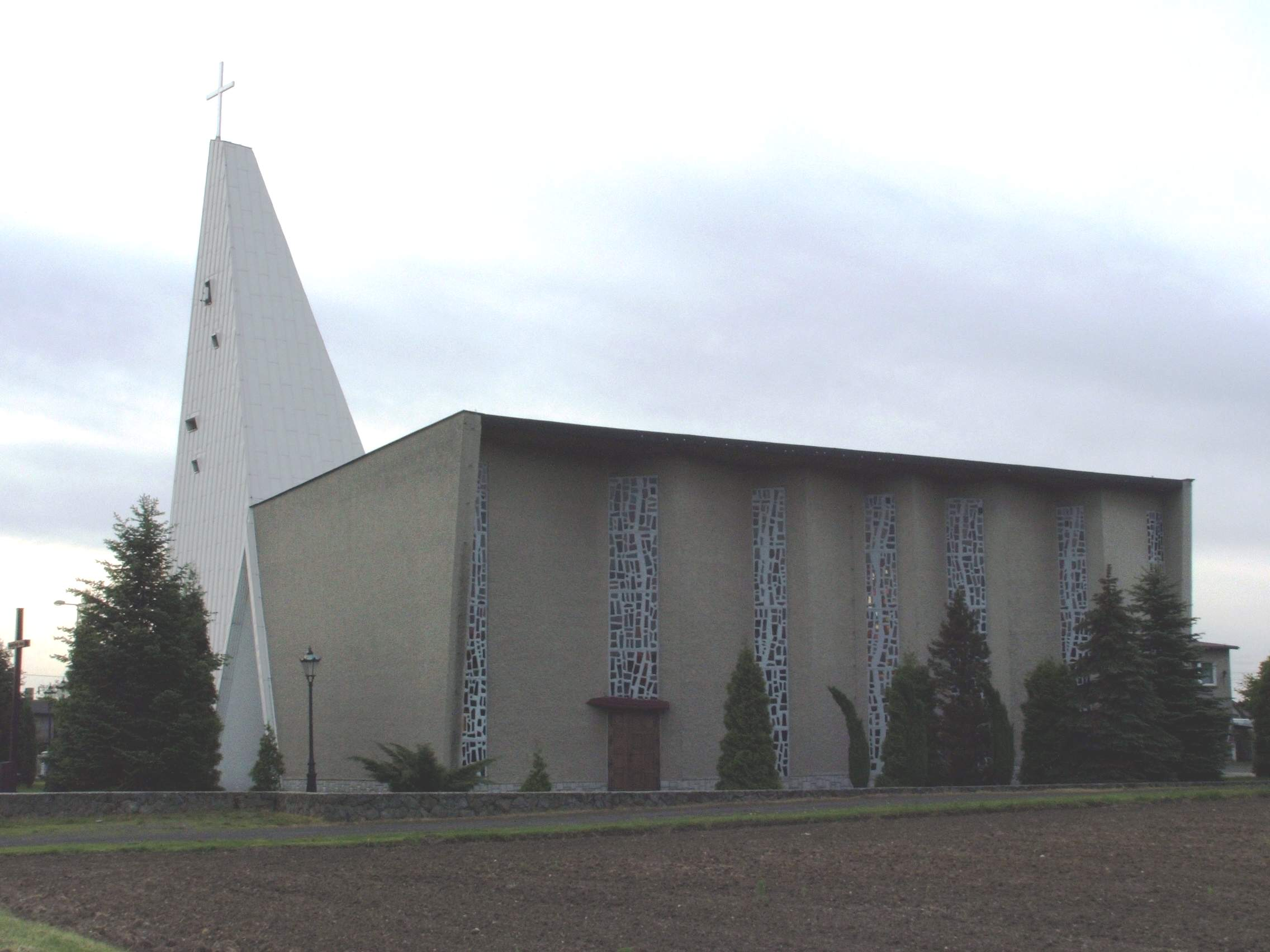
- Exaltation of the Holy Cross church

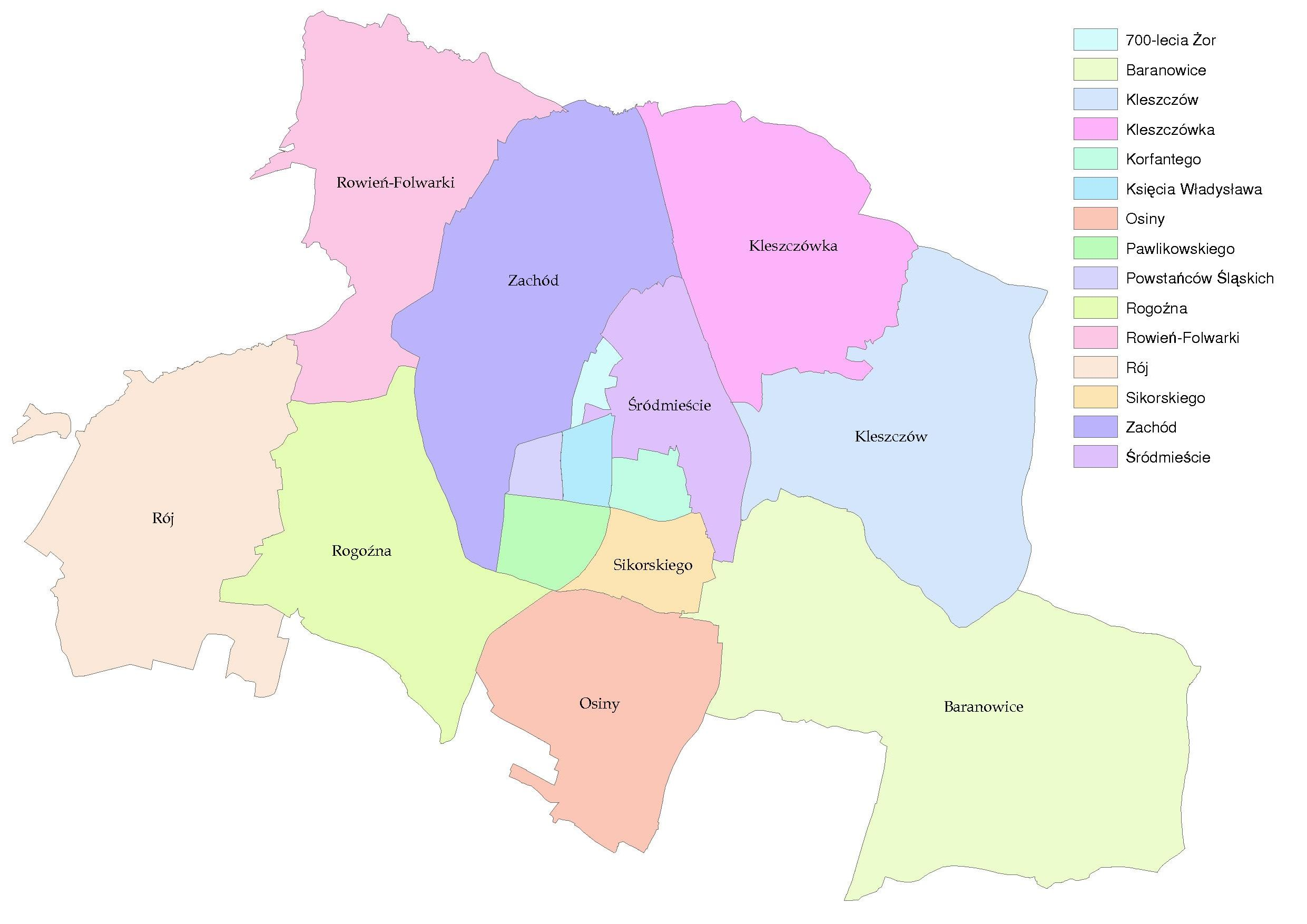
- Location of Rój within Żory
- Coordinates: 50°02′09.395″N 18°36′51.426″E
- Country: Poland
- Voivodeship: Silesian
- County/City: Żory
- Within city limits: 1977
- Time zone: UTC+1 (CET)
  - Summer (DST): UTC+2 (CEST)
- Area code: (+48) 032

Rój (German: Roy) is a district in southwestern Żory, Silesian Voivodeship, southern Poland.

The medieval name Ray, meaning "paradise," was later pronounced by locals (see Silesian dialects) as Roj. This pronunciation subsequently transformed into Rój, which literally means "swarming (honey bee)".

== History ==
The village was first mentioned in a Latin document of the Diocese of Wrocław called Liber fundationis episcopatus Vratislaviensis from around 1305 as item in Regno Dei id est Ray ex ordinacione datur ferto singulis annis. At that time, it was part of medieval Poland under the Piast.

In the 18th century, it was annexed by the Prussia. From 1871, it formed part of the German Empire. After World War I in the Upper Silesia plebiscite, 335 out of 375 voters in Rój voted in favour of rejoining Poland, while 40 opted for staying in Germany.

From 1945 to 1954, the village was part of the gmina of Boguszowice. In 1977, it was included within the city limits of Żory.
