= Żory =

- City county
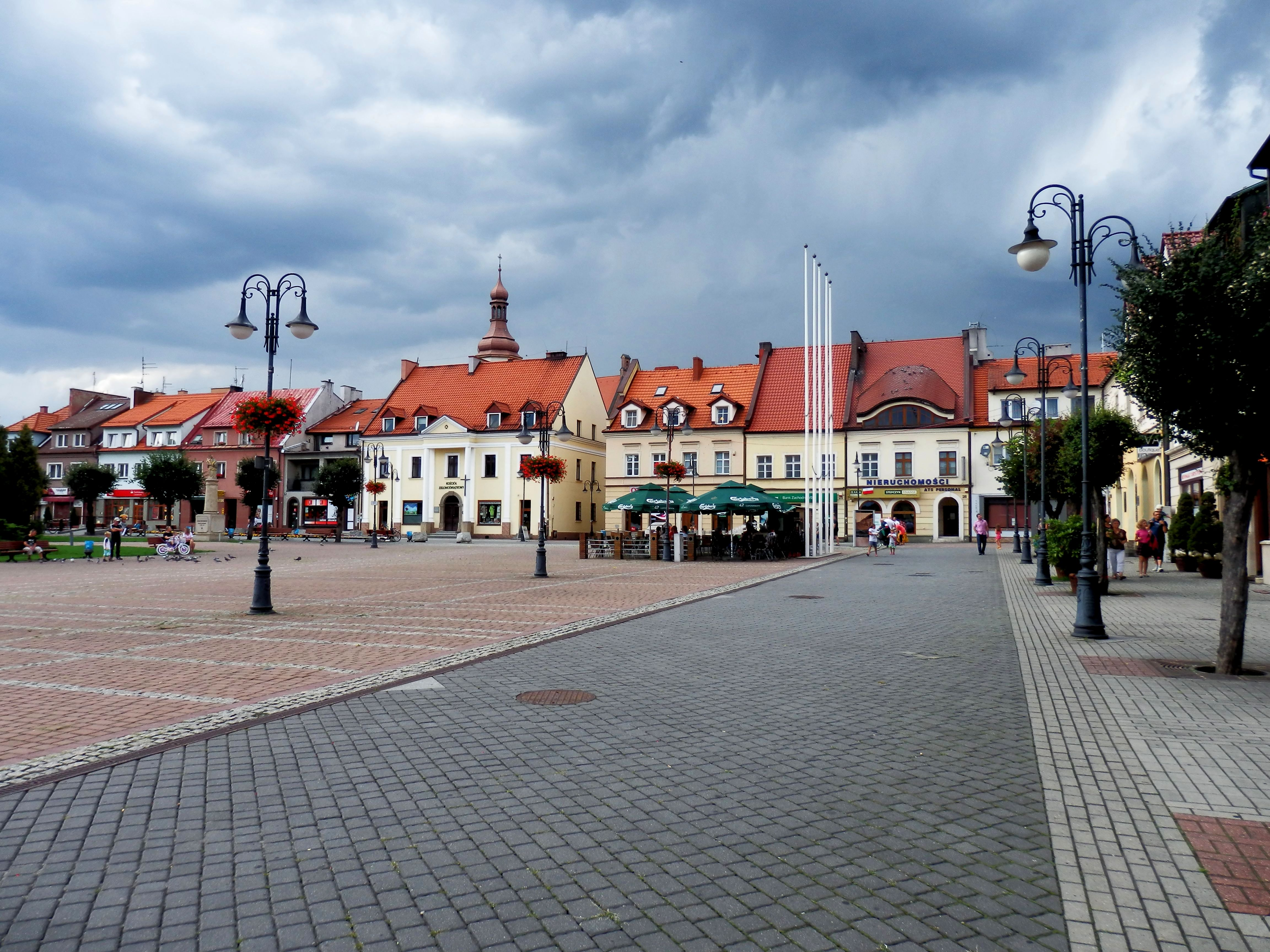
- Market square (rynek)

- Flag Coat of arms

- Location within Poland
- Coordinates: 50°3′N 18°42′E
- Country: Poland
- Voivodeship: Silesian
- County: city county
- First mentioned: 1258
- City rights: 1272

Government
  - Mayor: Waldemar Socha

Area
  - Total: 64.64 km^{2} (24.96 sq mi)

Population (31 December 2021)
  - Total: 62,848 ▲
  - Density: 972.3/km^{2} (2,518/sq mi)
- Time zone: UTC+1 (CET)
  - Summer (DST): UTC+2 (CEST)
- Postal code: 44-240
- Area code: +48 32
- Car plates: SZO
- Website: www.zory.pl

Żory ([ˈʐɔrɨ]; German: Sohrau, Silesian: Żory, Czech: Žáry, Žárov) is a city in the Silesian Voivodeship in southern Poland with 62,848 inhabitants (2021). It is located in the historic Upper Silesia region about 30 kilometres (19 mi) southwest of Katowice.

== Location ==
Żory is located in Upper Silesia on the Rybnik Plateau on the Ruda River.

As of 31 December 2012, the city had an area of 64.64 km (40 mi). On 1 January 2014, the city of Żory increased its area at the expense of Rybnik by 0.26 ha.

Żory borders the counties of Mikołów, Pszczyna and Rybnik, as well as the cities of Jastrzębie-Zdrój and Rybnik.

== Name ==
The meaning of the town's name is not clear and there are two theories about it. The first one derives it from Old Polish, from annealing, burning of forests, which was the first stage of establishing a permanent settlement in a given place. This version is related to the primitive economy of burning, which was an element of deforestation of the area for settlement. The topographic description of Upper Silesia from 1865, in turn, derives it from the Polish name of the crane bird (Polish: żuraw). It notes the following passage: "In den verscheidenen Urkunden wird Sohrau einmal Żoraw, dann Żora und auch Sora genannt. Der Name ist polnischen Ursprungs.", that is, in English, "In various documents notated as Żoraw, later Żora, and even Sora. The name is of Polish origin."

In the Latin book Liber fundationis episcopatus Vratislaviensis written in 1295–1305, the town is mentioned as Zary civitate - the town of Zary. The chronicle also lists villages founded under the Polish law iure polonico, which in the course of urbanization were absorbed by the town. These are the present districts or parts of the town Żory as Rogoźna in the fragment "Rogosina in una parte decima solvitur more polonico", Rowień in the fragment "Rovona [Hs. Ronoua.] decima solvitur more polonico", Rój as Ray, Brodek in the fragment "Brodek similiter solvitur decima more polonico."

The Polish name Żory and the German name Sohrau were mentioned by the Silesian writer Józef Lompa in his book Krótki rys jeografii Szląska dla nauki początkowej published in Głogówek in 1847. The Geographical Dictionary of the Kingdom of Poland published in 1880-1902 lists the town under the Polish name Żary and the German name Sohrau. The Polish name Żary and in the Upper Silesian dialect Żory, as well as the German name Sohrau are also mentioned in 1896 by the Upper Silesian writer, priest Konstanty Damrot, in his book about the local names in Upper Silesia. He also mentions Latinized names noted in Latin documents, such as Sary and Sari. A catalog of coats of arms of German localities, published in 1898 in Frankfurt am Main, identifies the Polish name as Zar.

== History ==
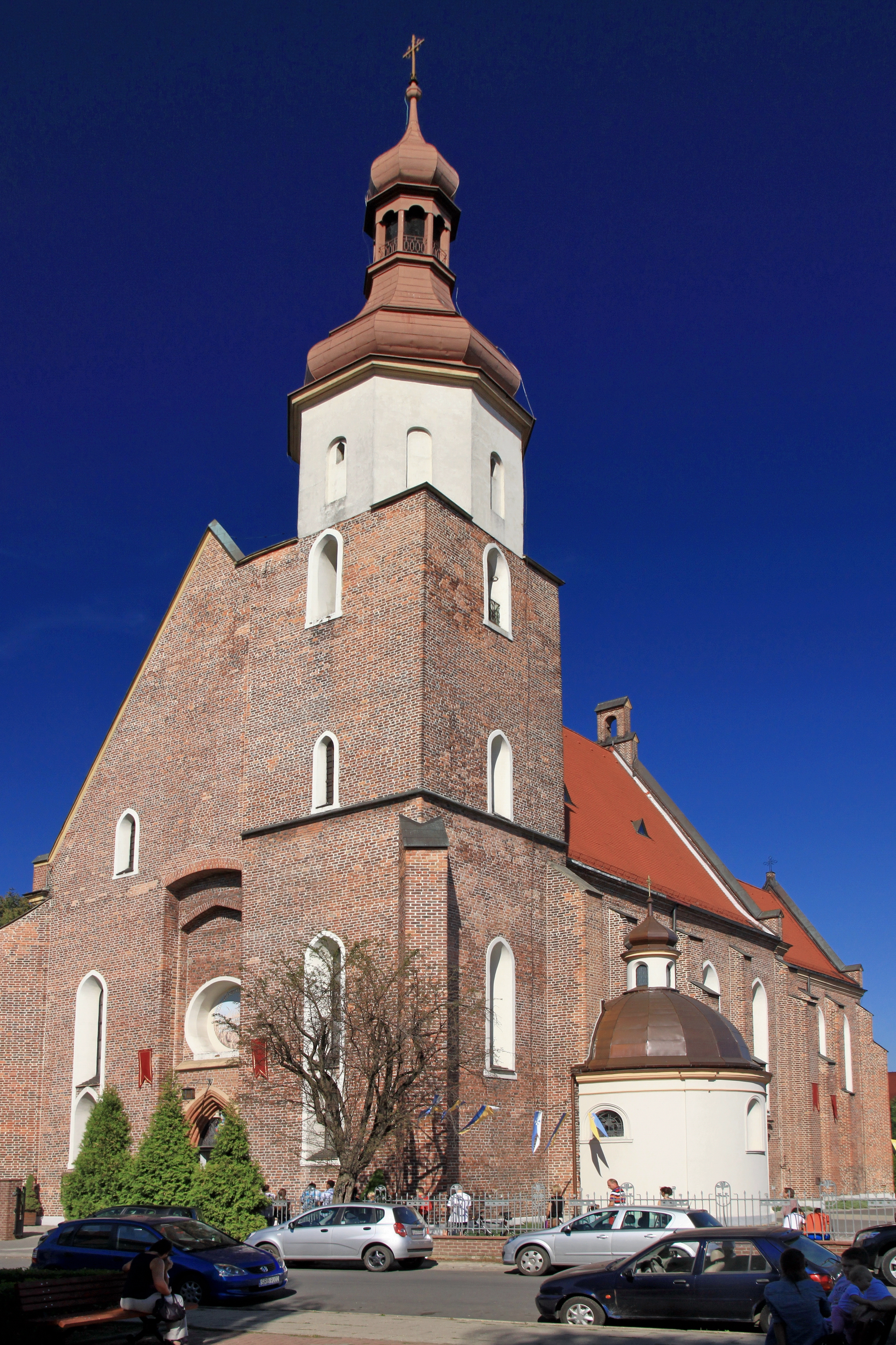
Saints Philip and Jacob parish church.

The settlement on the road from Cieszyn to Kraków was first mentioned in a 1258 deed, when it was part of fragmented Piast-ruled Poland. Żory is one of the oldest towns in Silesia, it was granted city rights according to Magdeburg Law on 24 February 1272 by Duke Władysław of Opole. It remained part of the Upper Silesian Duchy of Opole, since 1327 a Bohemian fief, until in 1532 it was incorporated into the Lands of the Bohemian Crown. In 1645 along with the Duchy of Opole and Racibórz it returned to Poland under the House of Vasa, and in 1666 it fell back to Bohemia. In the 18th century, it was centre of cloth manufacturing, later of metal and machining industry.

After the First Silesian War it was annexed by Prussia in 1742, and from 1871 it was part of Germany. In the 18th century, Żory belonged to the tax inspection region of Prudnik. After World War I, in 1918, Poland regained independence, and upon the 1921 Upper Silesia plebiscite, Żory passed to the Second Polish Republic, and was administratively part of the Silesian Voivodeship, though 69.4% of the citizens had voted for Germany, while in the surrounding villages (present-day districts) the overwhelming majority voted for Poland, i.e. in Rowień 91.9%, Kleszczów 90.9%, Rój 89.3%, Rogoźna 84.5%, Baranowice 82.2%, Folwarki 80.8%, Osiny 78.7%.

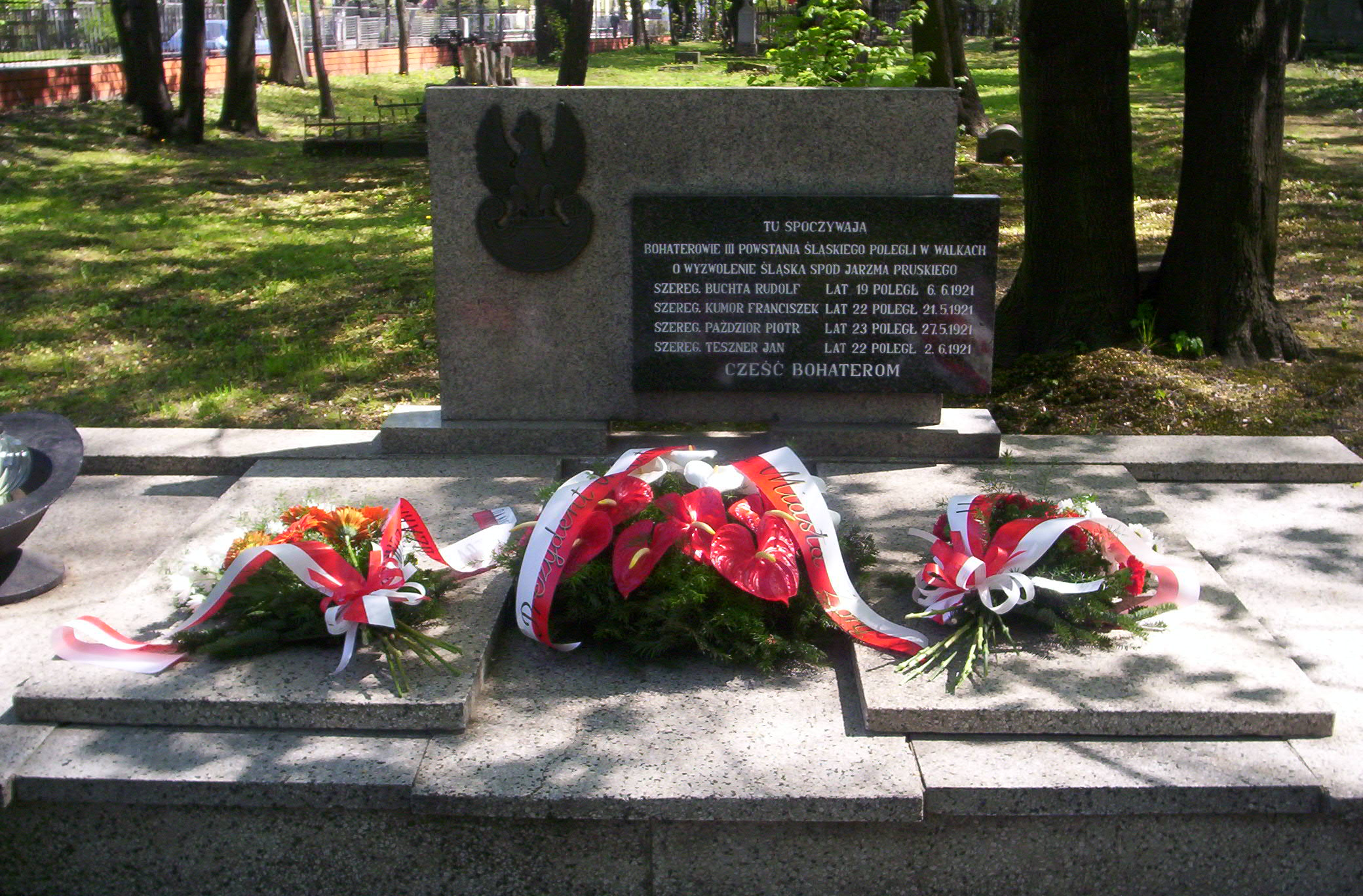
Mass grave of Polish insurgents of the Third Silesian Uprising of 1921

Żory was the site of a battle between Poles and the invading Germans on the first day of World War II, September 1, 1939. Afterwards it was occupied by Nazi Germany. The local Polish police chief and three other Polish policemen were murdered by the Russians in the Katyn massacre in 1940. From 1942 to 1945, the German occupying administration operated a Polenlager forced labour camp for Poles in the city. Among its prisoners were children whose parents were either arrested or deported to Germany. Poles expelled in 1942 from several villages and the town of Szczyrk were also temporarily held in the camp before deportation to forced labour to Germany. In the final stages of the war, in January 1945, the Germans murdered 40 prisoners of the Auschwitz concentration camp in the city during a death march. The city was conquered by Soviet and Czechoslovak troops in March 1945, the German population was expelled, and the city was restored to Poland.

Until 1998, it was administratively located in the Katowice Voivodeship. In 1975 and 1977, city limits were greatly expanded by including the settlements of Baranowice, Folwarki, Kleszczów, Osiny, Rogoźna, Rowień and Rój.

== Districts ==
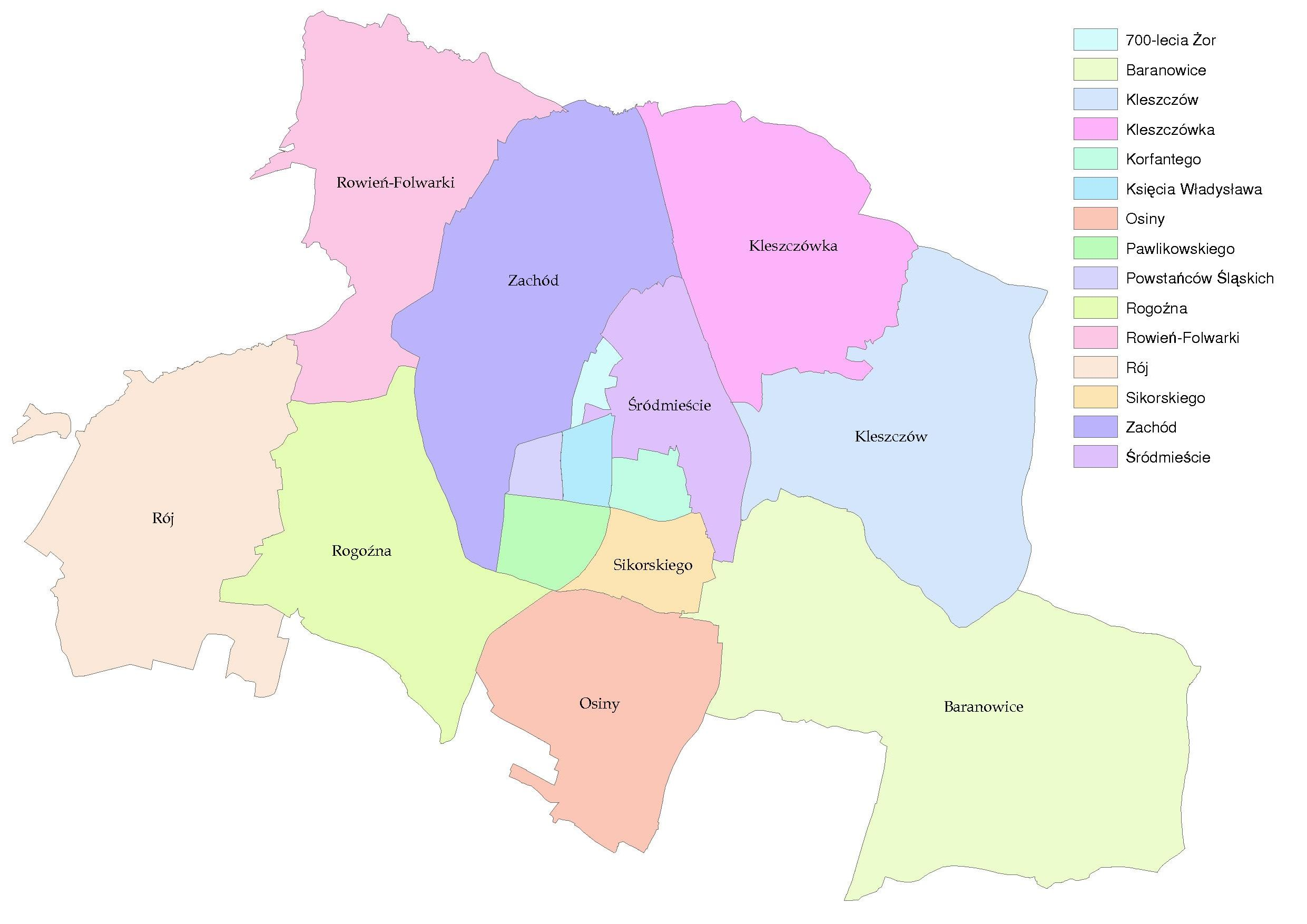
Division of the city into districts.

The town is subdivided into 15 districts.

- Śródmieście
- Pawlikowskiego
- Zachód
- Kleszczówka
- Powstańców Śląskich
- 700-lecia
- Korfantego
- Księcia Władysława
- Sikorskiego
- Rój
- Rogoźna
- Baranowice
- Osiny
- Rowień-Folwarki
- Kleszczów

== City Council ==
Formation	Term 2002–2006	Term 2006–2010	Term 2010–2014	Term 2014–2018	Term 2018–2023
Sojusz Lewicy Demokratycznej (Democratic Left Alliance)	6 (SLD-UP)	2 (LiD)	–	–	–
Żorskie Porozumienie i Waldemar Socha	10	6	9	7	9
Żorska Samorządność	7	–	–	6	7
Prawo i Sprawiedliwość (Law and Justice)	–	7	4	6	7
Platforma Obywatelska (Civic Platform)	–	7	7	4	–
Wspólne Żory	–	1	–	–	–
Inicjatywa Społeczna Nasze Żory	–	–	3	–	–

== Environmental protection ==
According to a 2016 report by the World Health Organization, Żory was ranked as the 49th most polluted city in the European Union.

== Monuments ==
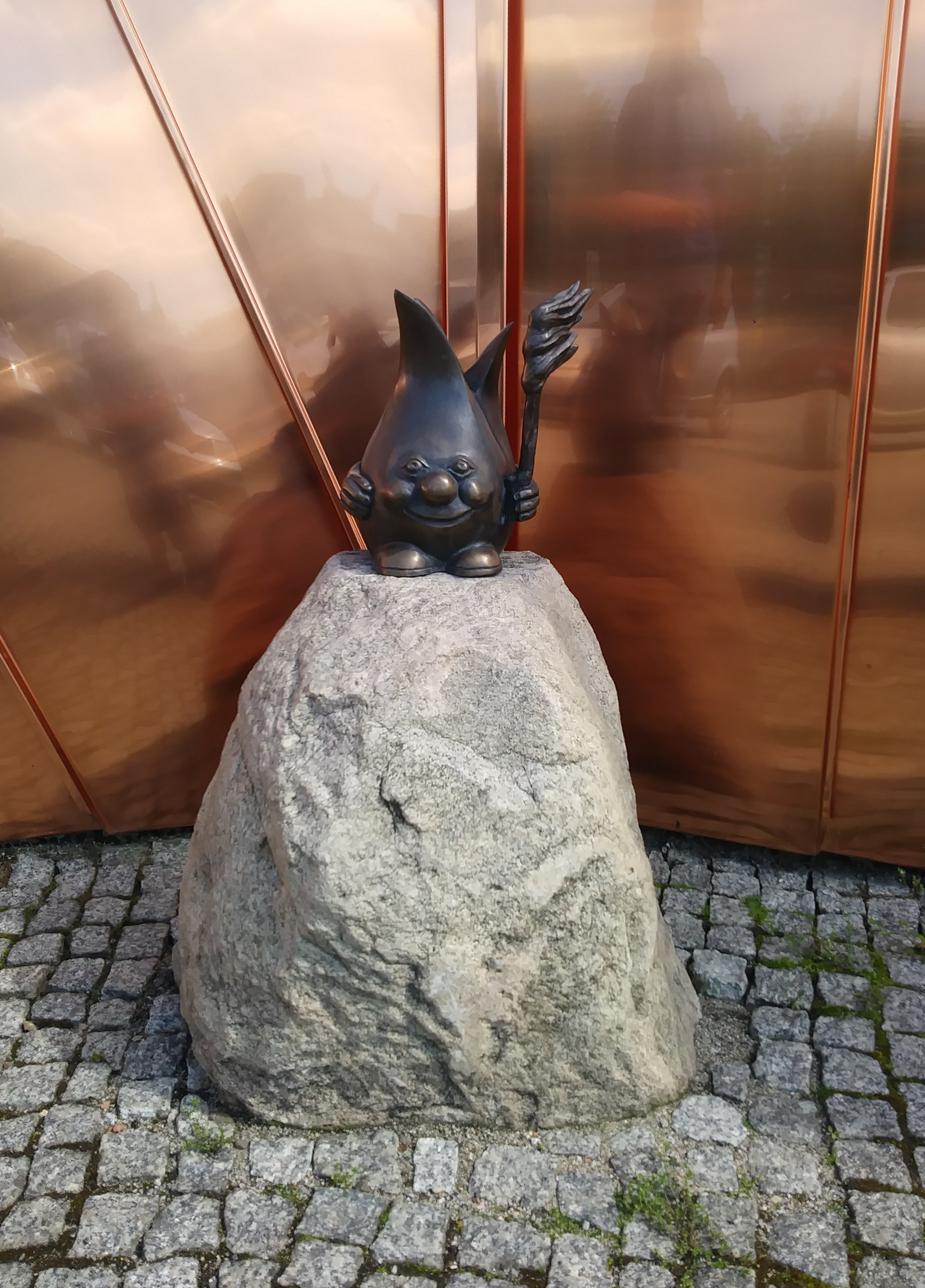
Żorek (symbol of the city) with a burning torch by the Museum of Fire.

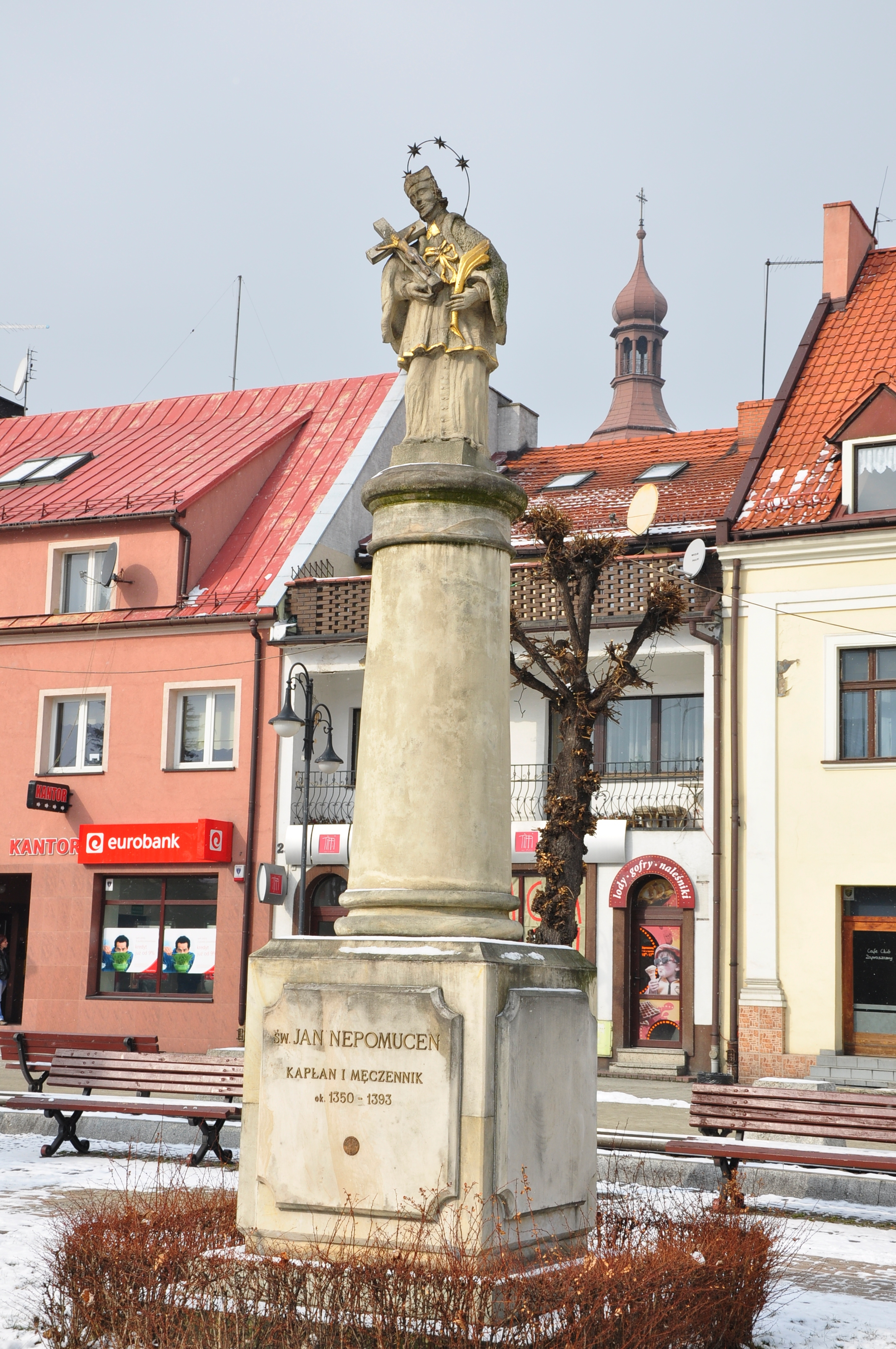
Statue of St. John of Nepomuk on the Market Square

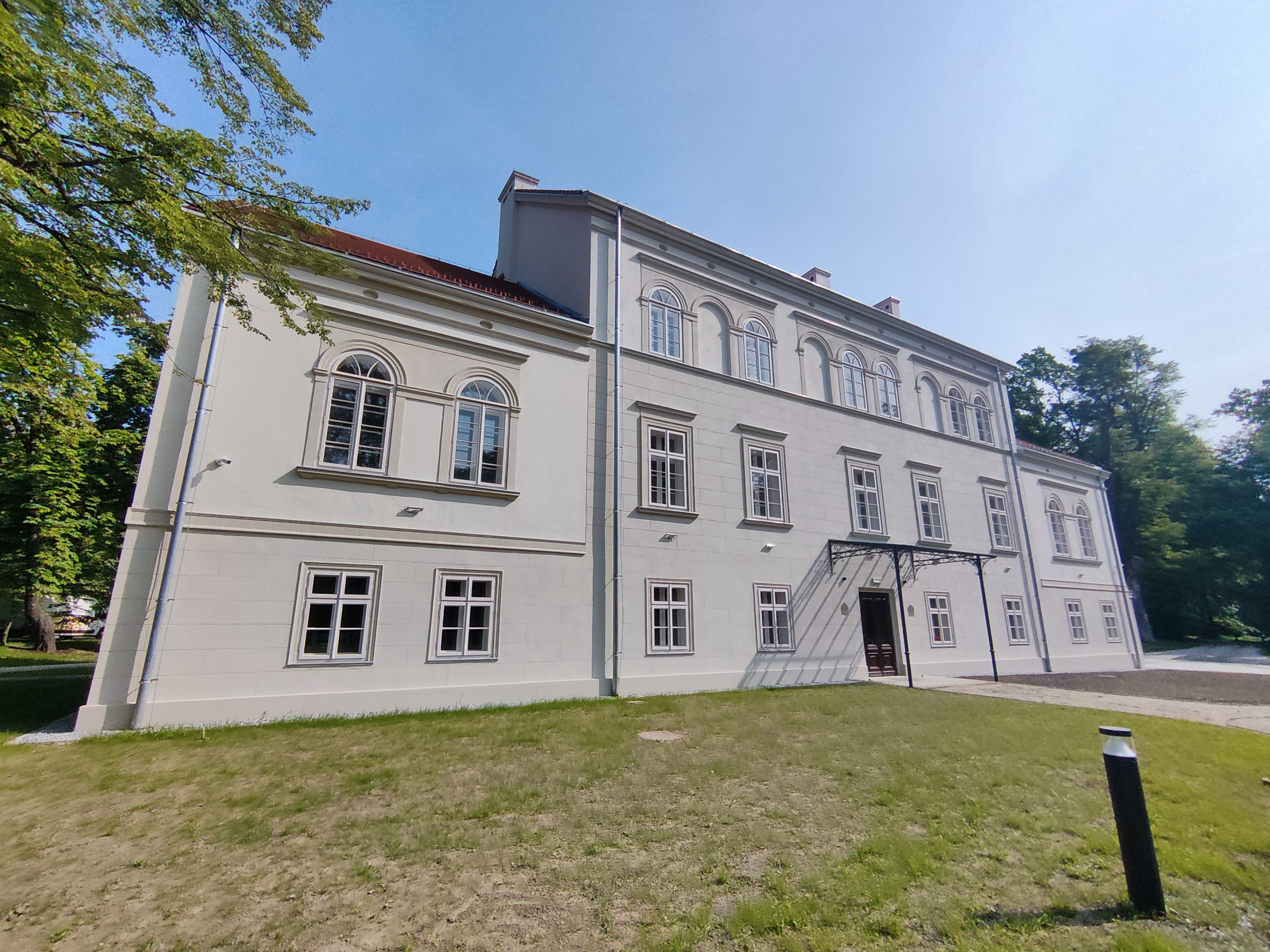
Palace in Baranowice

According to the National Institute of Cultural Heritage, the following historic buildings are located in the city:

- urban layout
- Gothic parish church of St. Apostles Philip and Jacob from the 15th century
- vicarage from the 19th century
- Evangelical-Augsburg church, 1931
- Evangelical-Augsburg parsonage, 1906
- fragments of a 14th-century fortification wall
- a house, 1 Bramkowa Street, from the 19th century
- the former People's House "Sala Polska", now a community centre, 1 Dolne Przedmieście Street (19th/20th century)
- market square in Żory
- a house, 5 Dolne Przedmieście street, 2nd half of the 19th century
- house, 1 Dworcowa street, 19th century
- complex of houses, 6 Dworcowa street, 1903 (a house, now a music school and a garden)
- low tenement houses built from bricks of the defensive wall in Murarska Street (no.: 11, 13, 19, 35, 37)
- market houses from the 19th century (no.: 1, 12, 23)
- houses on Szeptyckiego Street from the 19th century (no.: 4, 6, 9, 12, 19)
- houses on Szeroka Street from the 19th century (no.: 7, 12, 14, 16, 20)
- St. John Nepomucen statue in the Market Square
- a classicist Żory palace from the turn of the 17th and 18th centuries, in the Baranowice district
- the house at 111 Wodzisławska Street, from the end of the 19th century, in the district of Rogoźna
- a shrine on Rybnicka Street, from the 19th century, in the district of Rowień.

The full list can be found on this article on Polish Wikipedia.

In addition to the objects listed in the register of monuments, other objects of historical importance are also worthy of attention:

- the chapel in Murarska Street
- penitential stone crosses in the old cemetery in Meczenników Oświęcimskich Street and in Rogoźna district on the property in Wodzisławska Street
- Jewish cemetery - 1818

== Cycling routes ==
There are three cycling routes in the city:

- green cycling route no. 10 – Rybnik – Żory – Suszec
- red cycling route no. 305 – Palowice – Żory
- black cycling route no. 301 – Leszczyny – Żory

== Population ==
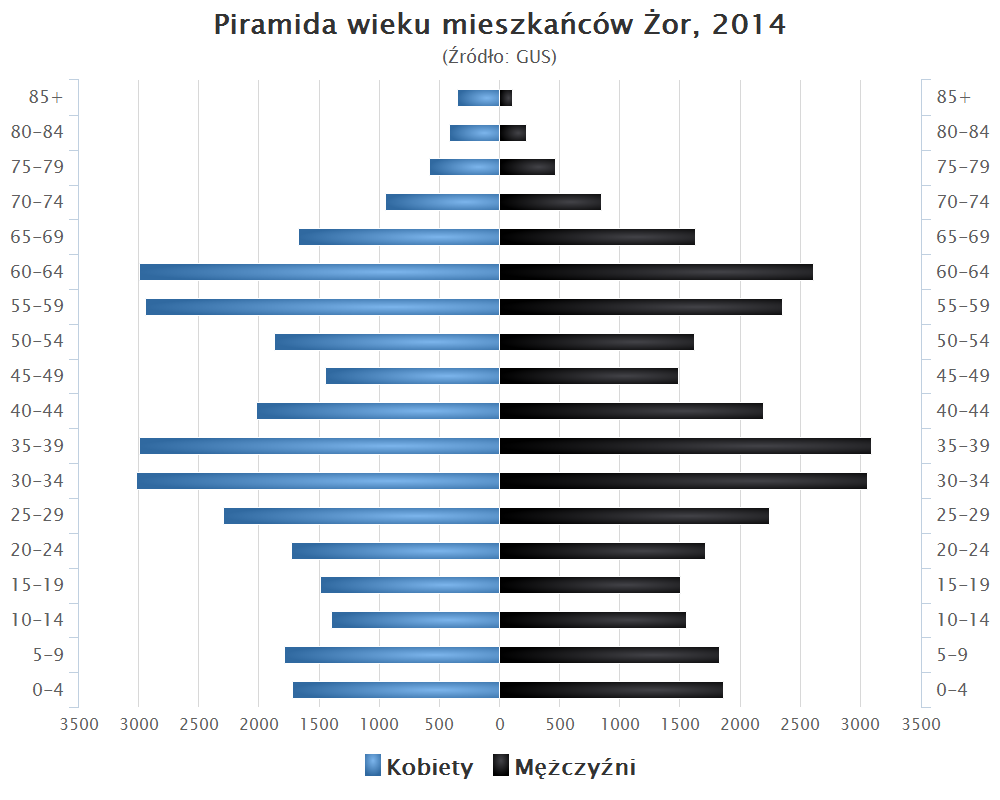
The age pyramid; blue - women, black - men.

Historical population

Year	Pop.	±%
1890	4,429	—
1900	4,311	−2.7%
1910	4,936	+14.5%
1921	5,400	+9.4%
1931	5,869	+8.7%

Year	Pop.	±%
1939	6,200	+5.6%
1950	5,037	−18.8%
1960	6,795	+34.9%
1970	8,700	+28.0%
1978	40,041	+360.2%

Year	Pop.	±%
1988	65,424	+63.4%
2002	63,461	−3.0%
2011	62,095	−2.2%
2021	61,823	−0.4%

- Total - 61945 (as of 31.12.2015)
- Women - 31589
- Men - 30356
- Unemployment - 8.4% (1545 people, as of December 31, 2015)

== Education ==
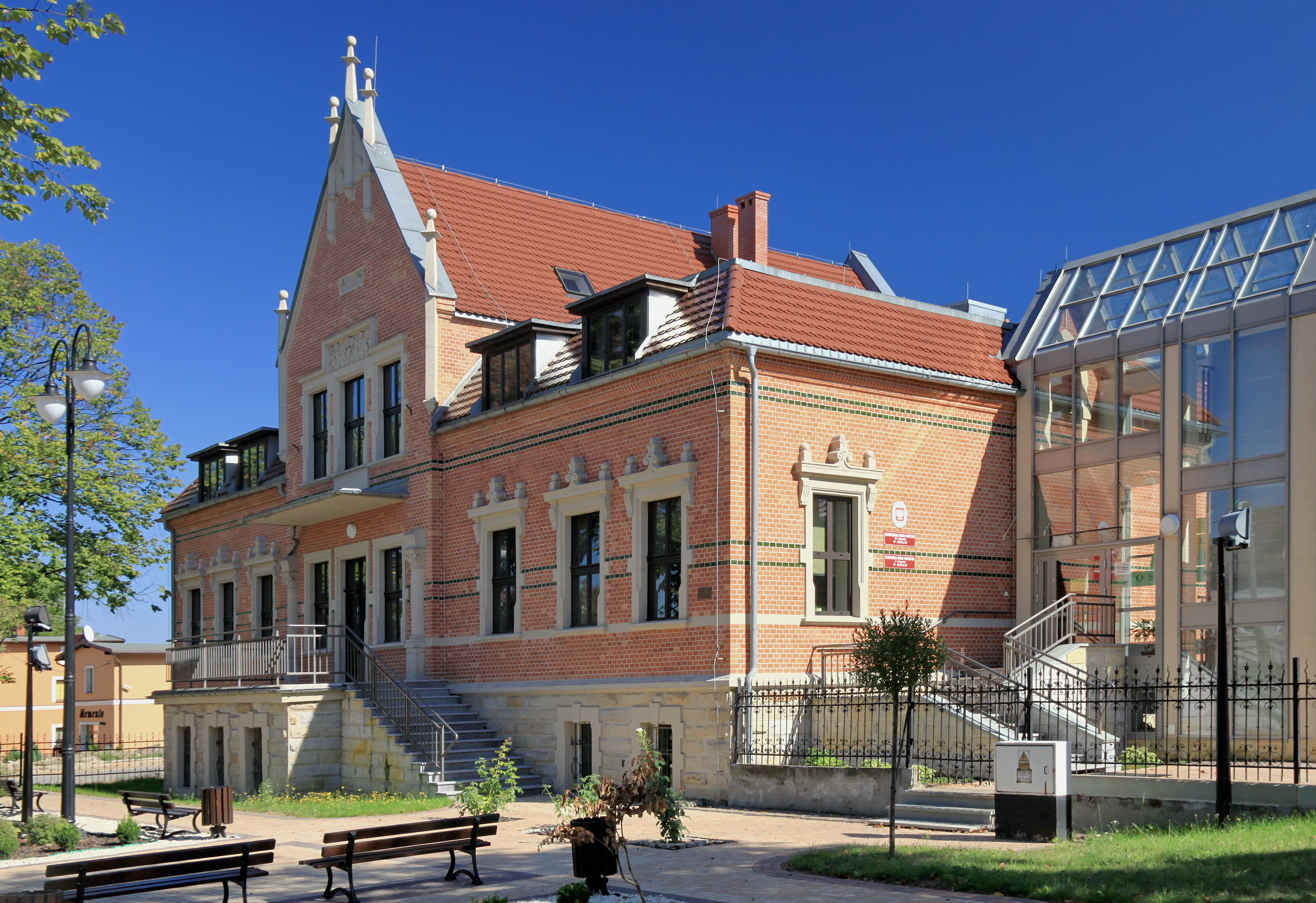
Music school in Żory

Żory offers a full range of educational services, from pre-school forms to university departments. There are 13 public kindergartens and numerous educational institutions, e.g.:

- Karol Miarka Liceum - I Liceum Ogólnokształcące z oddziałami dwujęzycznymi im. Karola Miarki in Żory
- Górnośląska Wyższa Szkoła Handlowa im. Wojciecha Korfantego in Katowice – Branch in Żory (Wydział zamiejscowy w Żorach)
- Silesian University of Technology - Branch in Żory

See the list of educational institutions in Żory on this article on Polish Wikipedia.

== Economy ==
The average gross monthly salary (2020) in PLN - 4,781.16, or 86.6% of the national average.

At the end of December 2013, the number of registered unemployed in Żory included about 2.0 thousand residents, which is an unemployment rate of 10.9% to the economically active population.

== Transport ==
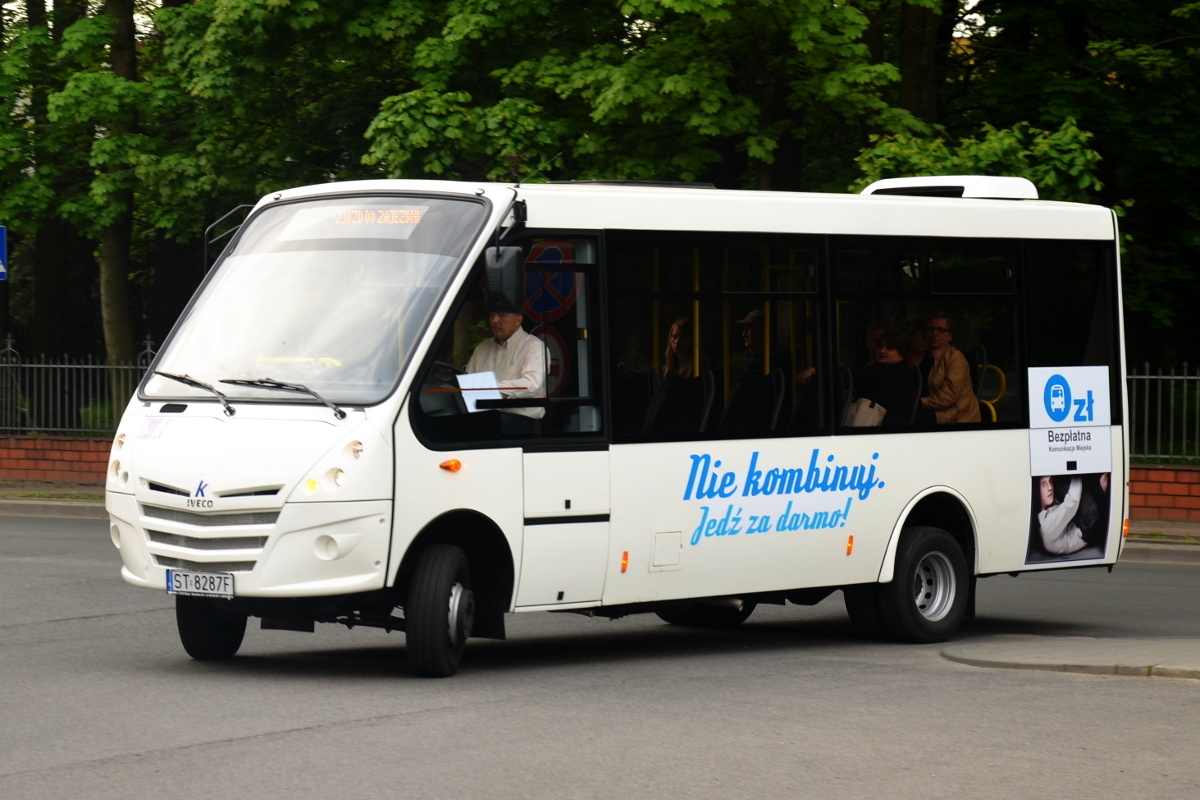
BKM Żory

=== City transport ===
The town has free city transport called Bezpłatna Komunikacja Miejska (BKM), which is organised by the Town Hall in Żory. There are also toll lines of MZK Jastrzębie-Zdrój, ZTZ Rybnik and ZTM, which connect Żory with neighbouring towns.

=== Road infrastructure ===
Through Żory (districts: Rowień-Folwarki and Rój) runs the A1 autostrada, connecting the south with the north of the country. The following roads run through the city:

- A1 autostrada (Gdańsk - Toruń - Łódź - Częstochowa - Gliwice - Żory - Gorzyczki)
- National road 81 (Katowice (A4) - Mikołów - Łaziska Górne - Żory - Skoczów (S52) - Harbutowice)
- Provincial road no. 924 (Kuźnia Nieborowska - Knurów - Czerwionka-Leszczyny - Żory)
- Provincial road no. 932 (Wodzisław Śląski - Świerklany - Żory)
- Provincial road no. 935 (Racibórz - Rybnik - Żory - Pszczyna)

=== Railroad connections ===
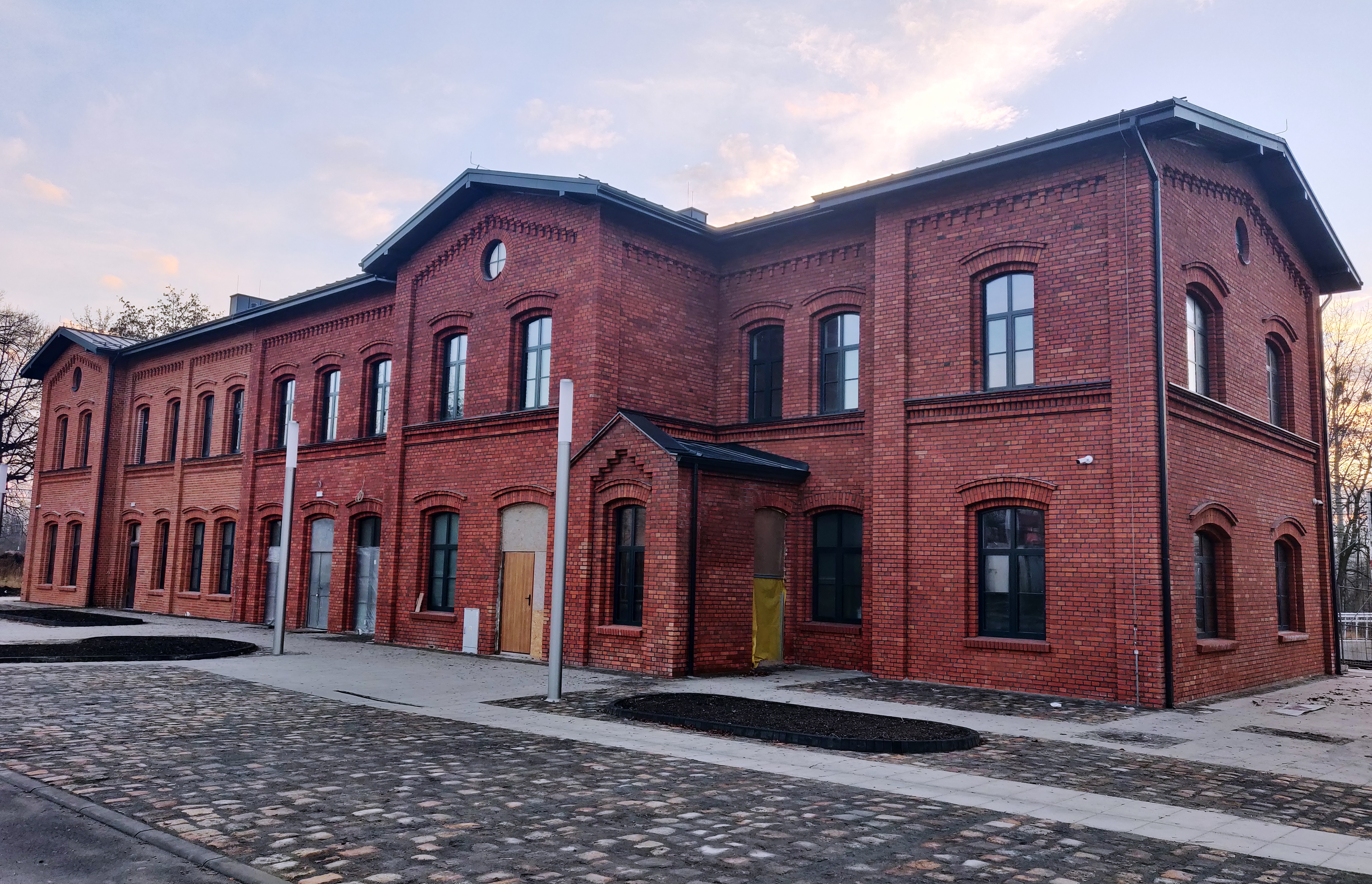
Żory railway station

The city has direct rail connections to:

- Bielsko-Biała
- Czechowice-Dziedzice
- Gliwice (weekends)
- Kędzierzyn-Koźle
- Kołobrzeg (seasonal)
- Opole
- Pszczyna
- Rybnik
- Świnoujście (seasonal)
- Szczecin Główny (seasonal)
- Wisła (weekends)
- Wodzisław Śląski
- Wrocław Główny
- Kostrzyn nad Odrą (seasonal)
- Zielona Góra (seasonal)

As the neighbouring Jastrzębie-Zdrój is striving to restore the railroad connection, one of the analysed options assumes connecting Jastrzębie-Zdrój with Katowice via Żory and Orzesze.

=== Technical infrastructure ===
- Hotspot on the Market Square.
- Electronic displays at bus stops (BKM) informing about departures and delays.
- Outdoor video screens at busy places around the city.

=== City bicycles ===
In September 2018, GeoVelo urban bike rental service was launched in Żory. In Żory you can use 80 modern unicycles of the so-called fourth generation.

GeoVelo bikes can be rented and returned at 26 locations.

== Culture ==
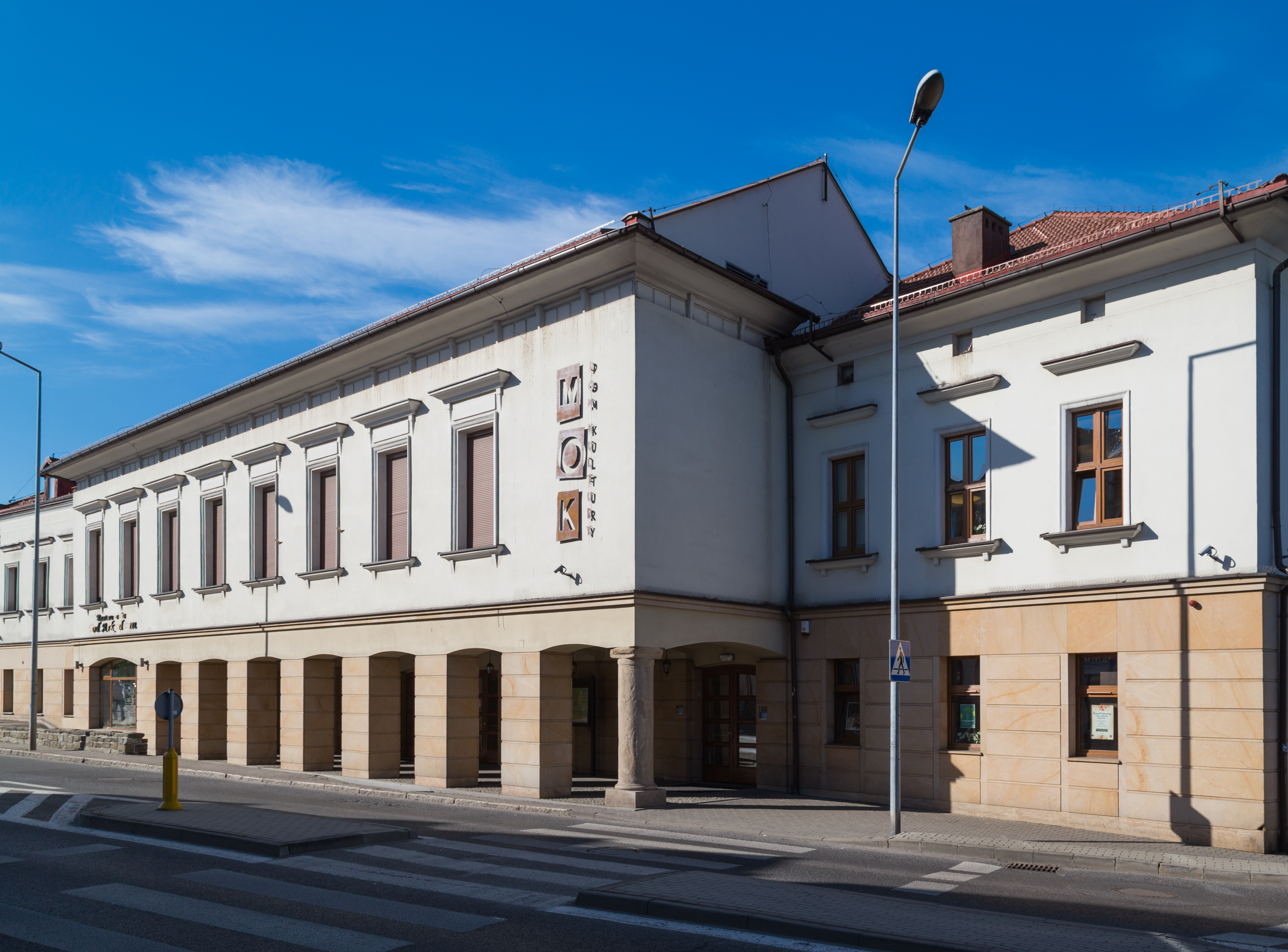
Municipal Cultural Center

The city has a Municipal Cultural Center called Miejski Ośrodek Kultury (MOK) with an auditorium where concerts and theatrical performances are held. Apart from the center, there are also day-care rooms in individual districts of the city where artistic activities take place.

There are two cinemas in the city: Scena "Na Starówce" with one screening room and Helios cinema in Galeria Wiślanka shopping mall with four screening rooms.

In Żory there is the Town Public Library (Miejska Biblioteka Publiczna), which has 7 branches.

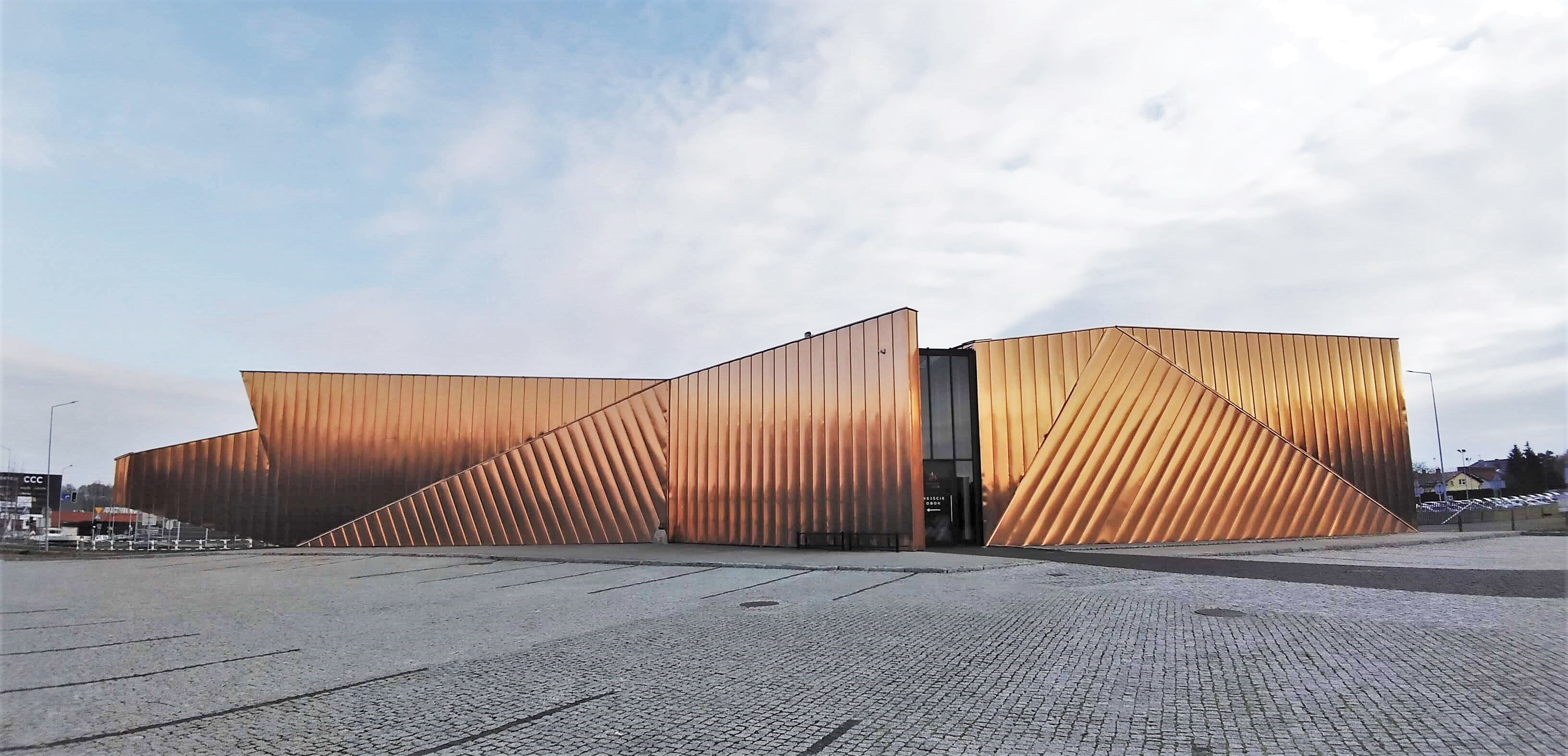
Museum of Fire in Żory

The Town Museum (Muzeum Miejskie) is located in the historic Hearinga Villa and has two permanent exhibitions: Nasza toższamość (Our Identity) and Polskie poznawanie świata (Polish Learning about the World). The second museum is the Museum of Fire, located in a building built in 2014 and considered to be an outstanding work of contemporary architecture.

== Sport ==
On March 28, 1920, a nest of the oldest Polish sports organization, the Polish Gymnastic Society "Sokół", was established in Żory. The circle was organizationally subordinate to the VIII Rybnik district of the Silesian district of the Polish Gymnastic Society "Sokól" and belonged to a number of gymnastic sections of the Silesian Sokól. In 1920, the Żory circle of this organization had 39 members.

=== Clubs ===
- Octagon Team Żory (martial arts)
- LKS Jedność Rogoźna (football)
- UKS Salmo Żory (swimming)
- MTS Żory (handball)
- MKS Żory (football)
- LKS Rój Żory (tennis, football)
- Iskra Rowień (football)
- MKS Polaris Żory (football)
- LKS Baranowice (football)
- Gepardy Żory (baseball)
- KS Ogniwo Rogoźna Żory (tennis)
- MOSiR MUKS Sari Żory (volleyball)
- UKS Czwórka Żory (athletics)
- Ks Kleszczów (football)
- MMA Sozo Żory (martial arts)
- Ks Hawajskie Koszule Żory (basketball)
- Grupa Biegowa HRmax Żory (athletics)
- UKS Judo Kontra Żory (judo)
- Żorska Akademia Koszykówki
- Żorska Akademia Talentów Jastrzębski Węgiel

=== Sport places ===
- MOSiR Żory
- OLPN Żory

=== Orlik 2012 ===
Currently in Żory there are five sports fields built within the framework of the Orlik 2012 program.

== Religious communities ==
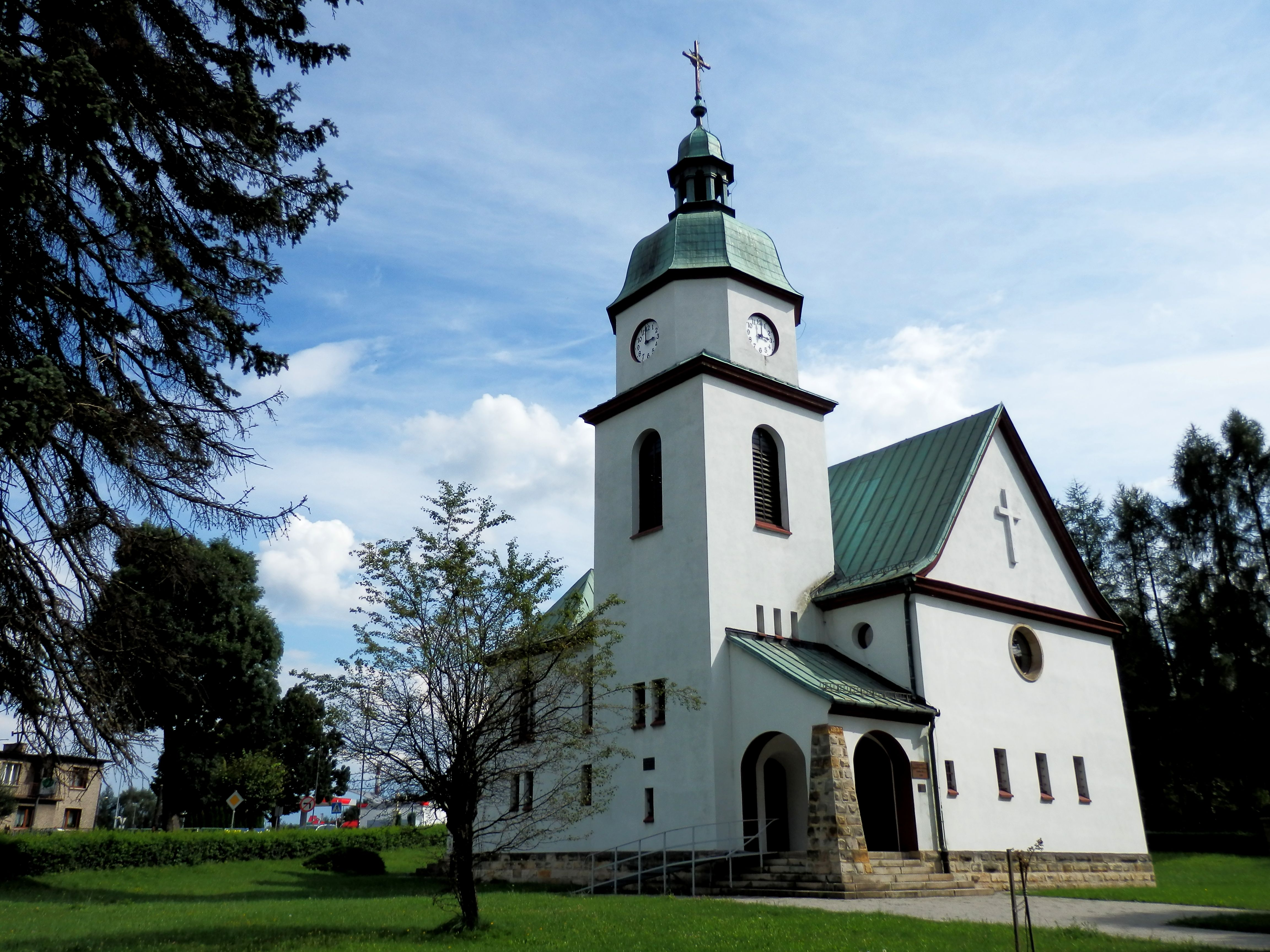
Evangelical Church of the Augsburg Confession

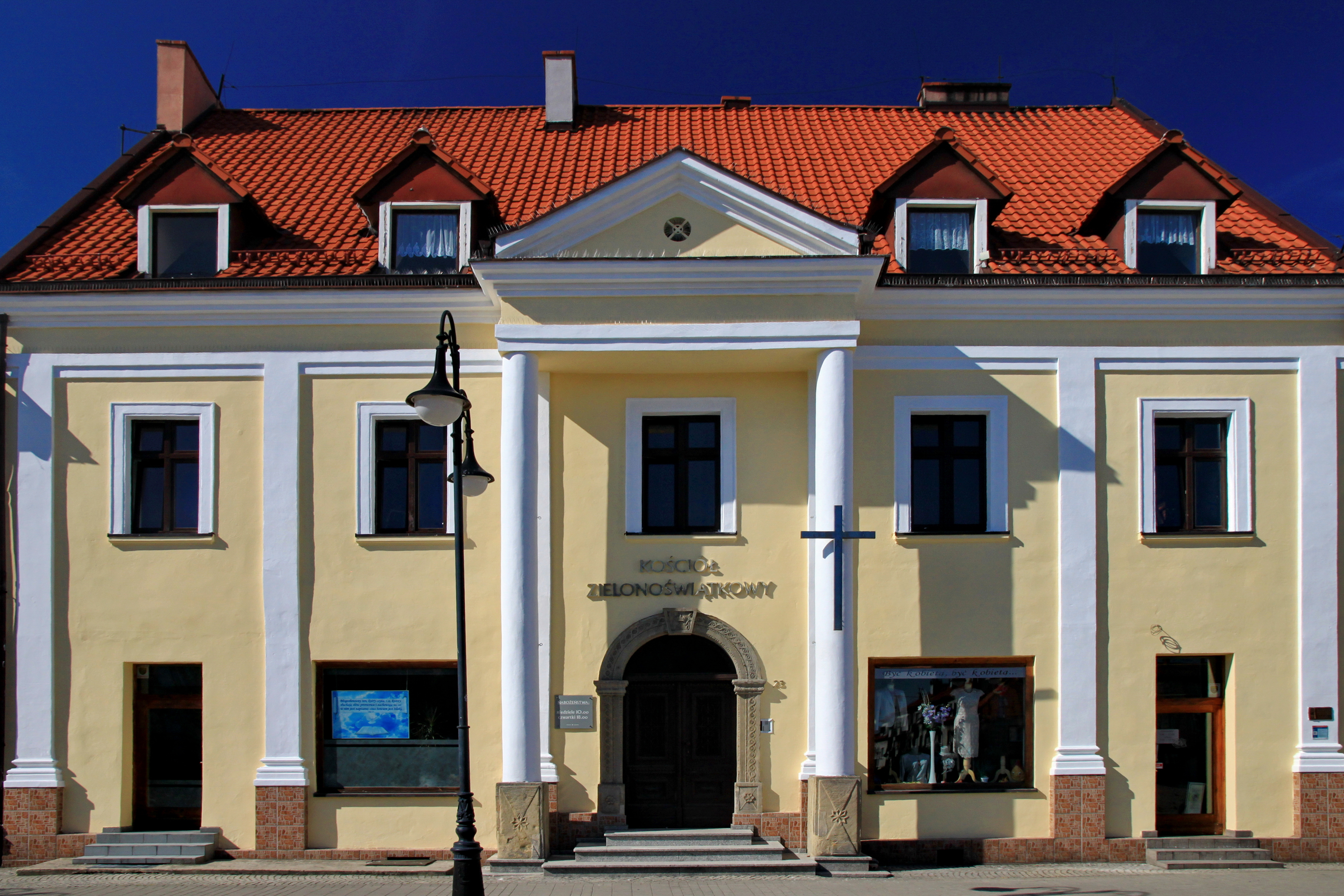
Pentecostal church

The following religious associations are active in Żory:

Seventh-day Adventist Church, located in the Osiny district

Kościół Chrześcijan Dnia Sobotniego (The Church of the Saturday-Day Christians)

Evangelical Church of the Augsburg Confession in Poland: parafia Zbawiciela (parish of the Saviour)

Roman Catholic Church (Żory deanery):

- Parish of St. Apostles Philip and James
- Parish of St. Stanislaus the Bishop and Martyr
- Parish of the Divine Mercy
- Parish of St. Brother Albert in Kleszczówka
- Parish of St. Hedwig of Silesia in Baranowice
- Parish of Our Lady of Czestochowa in Kleszczów
- Parish of St. Joseph the Worker in Osiny
- Parish of the Blessed Virgin Mary Mother of the Church in Rogoźna
- Parish of the Immaculate Heart of the Blessed Virgin Mary in Rowień
- Parish of the Elevation of the Holy Cross in Rój

Kościół Wolnych Chrześcijan (Free Christian Church)

Pentecostal Church in Poland: church "Elim" in Żory

Jehovah's Witnesses (Sala królestwa ul. Hańcówka 41)

== Notable people ==
- Otto Stern (1888–1969), physicist and Nobel laureate
- Jerzy Makula (born 1952), pilot, two times European Glider Aerobatic Champion and six times World Glider Aerobatic Champion
- Stanisław Sojka (born 1959), jazz and pop singer-songwriter
- Ewa Swoboda (born 1997), sprinter

== Twin towns – sister cities ==
Żory is twinned with:

- Kamp-Lintfort, Germany
- Mezőkövesd, Hungary
- Pasvalys, Lithuania
- Montceau-les-Mines, France
- Tetiiv, Ukraine
