= Bezpłatna Komunikacja Miejska in Żory =

Free public transport in city Żory

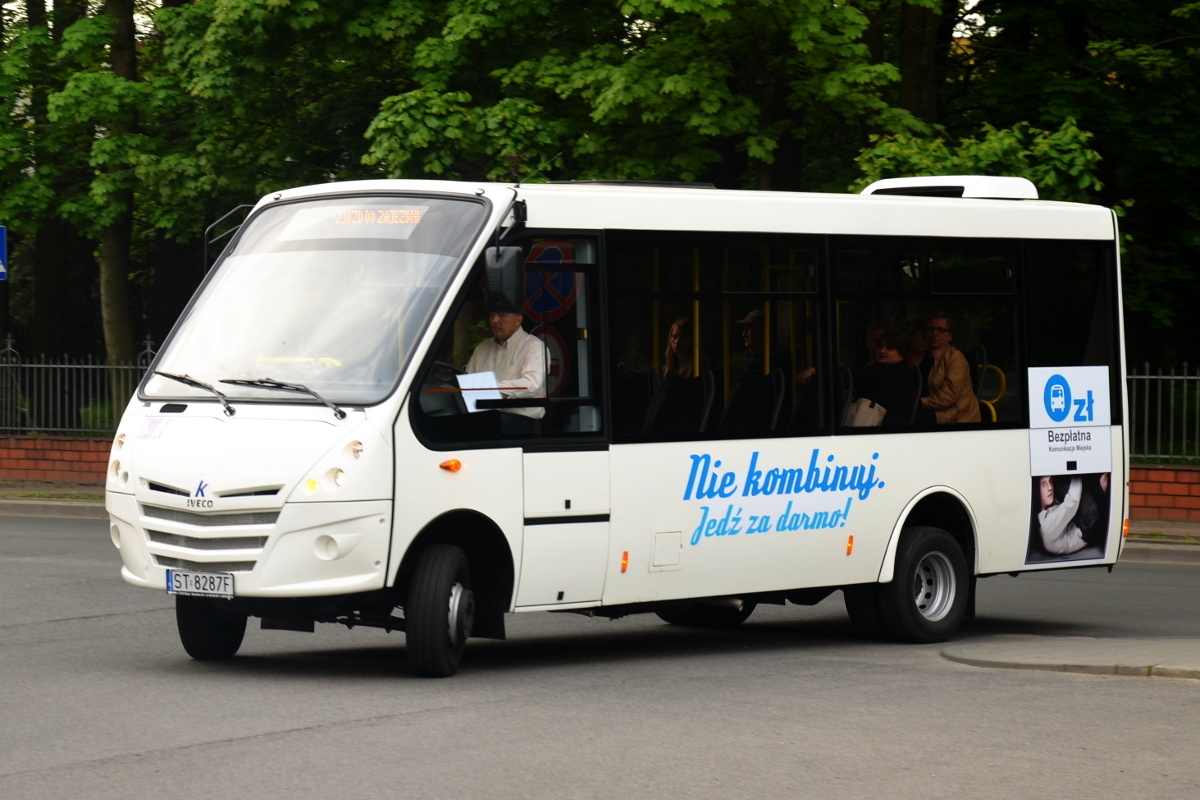
One of the BKM buses.

Bezpłatna Komunikacja Miejska in Żory (BKM) (eng. The Żory Free Public Transport) was launched on 1 May 2014. Initially, there were 7 bus lines, with an additional line 8 starting in 2019. All lines start at the Żory Transfer Center (CPŻ), Poland. BKM's motto is: "Don't weasel. Ride for free!" (pol. "Nie kombinuj. Jedź za darmo!")

Before the introduction of the BKM, 12 lines of the Międzygminny Związek Komunikacyjny (MZK) operated in the city, of which 6 now remain. They provide communication with neighboring municipalities.

== Lines ==
01 Centrum Przesiadkowe – Osińska – Wolontariuszy – Żołnierzy Września – Dąbrowskiego – Centrum Przesiadkowe

02 Centrum Przesiadkowe – Dąbrowskiego – Żołnierzy Września – Wolontariuszy – Osińska – Centrum Przesiadkowe

03 Osiny ul. Główna – Centrum Przesiadkowe – Kleszczówka

04 Al. Jana Pawła II – Bajerówka – Rybnicka – Centrum Przesiadkowe – Kleszczówka

05 Al. Jana Pawła II – Bajerówka – Centrum Przesiadkowe – Wodzisławska – Os. Gwarków – Boguszowicka / Świerklany Dolne / Kopalnia Jankowice

06 Pukowca – Al. Jana Pawła II – Centrum Przesiadkowe – Kleszczówka – Miasteczko Westernowe

07 Francuska – Al. Zjedn. Europy – Dąbrowskiego – Centrum Przesiadkowe – Jasna

08 Al. Jana Pawła II – Al. Zjedn. Europy – Centrum Przesiadkowe – Wygoda – Rybnicka
