= Gmina Wyry =

Gmina Wyry Wyry Commune
- Gmina
- Coat of arms Wordmark
- Interactive map of Gmina Wyry
- Coordinates (Wyry): 50°8′N 18°55′E
- Country: Poland
- Voivodeship: Silesian
- County: Mikołów
- Seat: Wyry

Area
  - Total: 34.45 km^{2} (13.30 sq mi)

Population (2019-06-30)
  - Total: 8,316
  - Density: 241.4/km^{2} (625.2/sq mi)
- Website: https://wyry.pl/

Gmina Wyry (German: Wyrow) is a rural gmina (administrative district) in Mikołów County, Silesian Voivodeship, in southern Poland. Its seat is the village of Wyry, which lies approximately 4 kilometres (2 mi) south of Mikołów and 15 km (9 mi) south-west of the regional capital Katowice. The gmina also contains the village of Gostyń.

The gmina covers an area of 34.45 square kilometres (13.3 sq mi), and as of 2019 its total population is 8,316.

== Neighbouring gminas ==
Gmina Wyry is bordered by the towns of Łaziska Górne, Mikołów, Orzesze and Tychy, and by the gmina of Kobiór.

== Twin towns – sister cities ==
Gmina Wyry is twinned with:

- Medesano, Italy
