= Polenlager =

Series of German forced labour camps in Silesia, Poland in World War II

- Nazi concentration camp
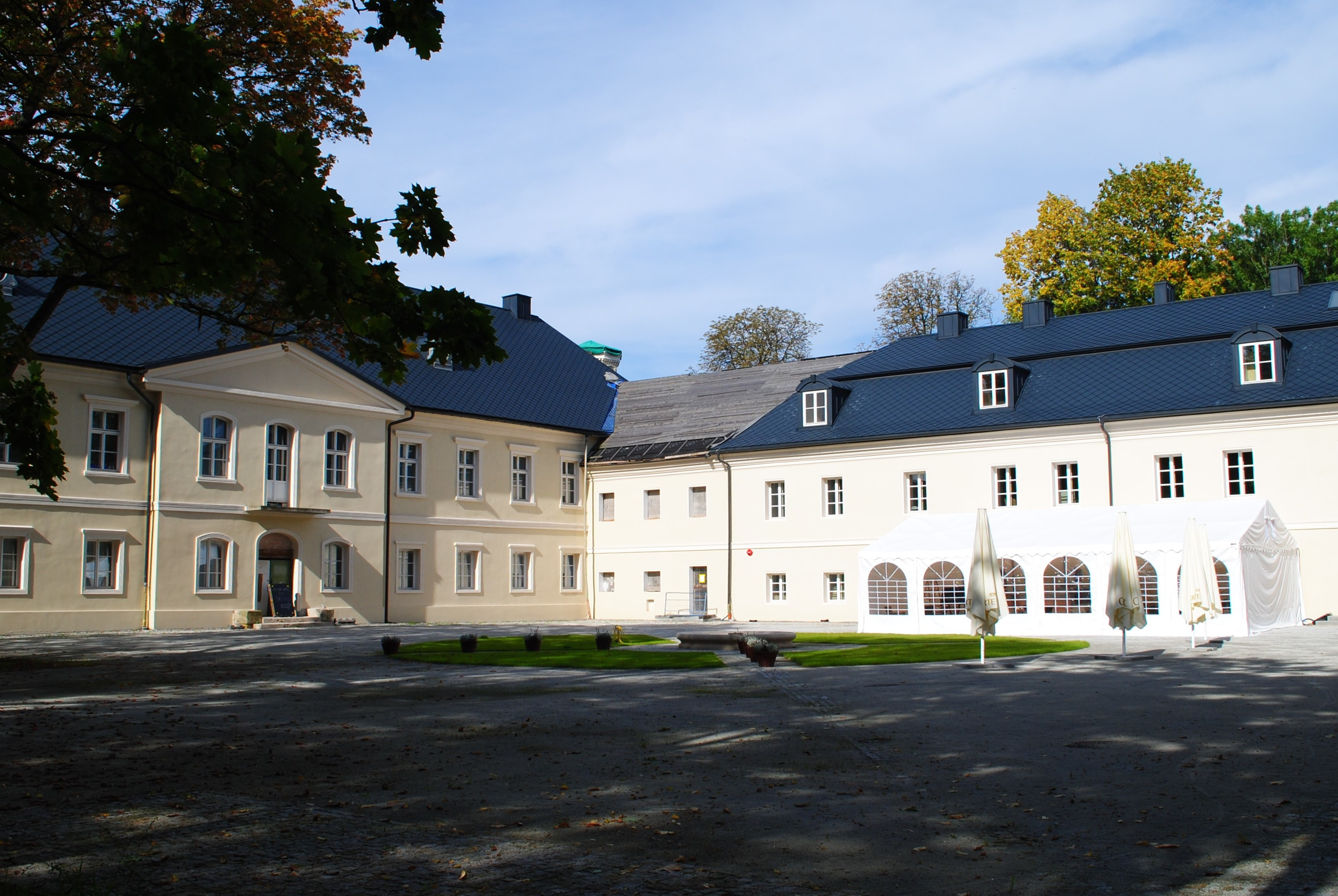
- Remnants of Polenlager 10 at Donnersmarck manor in Siemianowice Śląskie, with over 700 prisoners.

Operation
- Period: 1942–1945

The Polenlager (German pronunciation: [ˈpoːlənˌlaːɡɐ], Polish Camps) was a system of forced labor camps in Silesia that held Poles during the World War II Nazi German occupation of Poland. The prisoners, originally destined for deportation across the border to the new semi-colonial General Government district, were sent to the Polenlager between 1942 and 1945, once the other locations became too overcrowded to accommodate the prisoners.

There were over 30 Polenlager camps, mostly in Silesia.

== History ==
All Polenlager camps were classified by the Germans as "labour reformatories". They were built near major military work-sites for the steady supply of slave labor. The camps had permanent German staff, augmented by captives and volunteers from other Eastern European countries (known as Hiwis). The Poles were delivered to Polenlagers by trainloads from German temporary transit camps, after they had been evicted from their homes to make way for new settlers (see: Action Saybusch). Some of the Silesians who were imprisoned there, refused to sign the Volksliste (DVL) or claim German nationality.

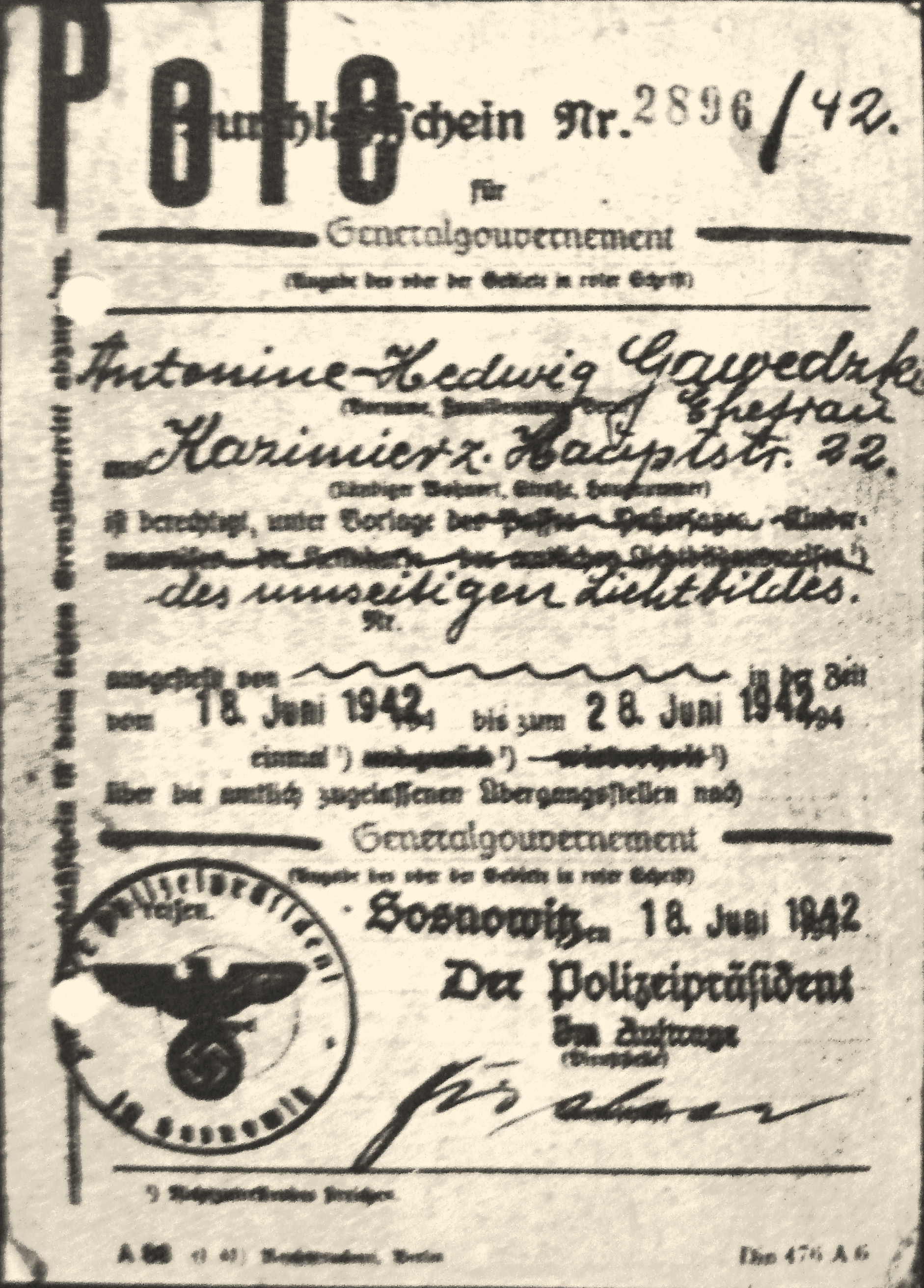
Expulsion Warrant for a female from Sosnowiec, stamped Pole, 1942

The Polenlager idea was part of Adolf Hitler's plan, known as Lebensraum, which involved Germanization of all Polish areas annexed by Nazi Germany with the help of settlers from Bukovina, Eastern Galicia and Volhynia. The main purpose of the forcible displacement of Poles was to create a German-only enclave known as Reichsgau Wartheland across the formerly Polish territories.

== Camp distribution ==
There were over 30 Polenlager camps identified in research – mostly in Silesia (26), but also in other locations across the Third Reich and in the present day Czech Republic. Historians estimate their number to have been even higher. In some camps, such as Polenlager 92 in Kietrz (Katscher), the living accommodations were set up in the factory where prisoners worked; they were given about 1 square metre (11 sq ft) per person to live on, at a redesigned floor of the Schaeffler textile factory. – In 1943, they processed into yarn 3 tons of human hair delivered from Auschwitz in two railroad cars.

At the Polenlager 75 in Racibórz (Ratibor) – with 142 prisoners as of January 14, 1943 according to records – 22,1% were below the age of 14 years. At the Polenlager 10 in Siemianowice Śląskie (pictured), children as young as eight were forced to work at a stone quarry. The extant documentation indicates that plans for further expansion of the Polenlager camp system had also been made. All of them were designated within the general numbering framework of the Volksdeutsche Mittelstelle camps. They were not numbered successively.

#	Camp designation	City or town (in Polish and German)	Notes
1	Polenlager 4	Dąbrówka Mała (Eichenau)	in Katowice neighborhood
2	Polenlager 7	Ruda Śląska (Ruda-Kochlowitz, Aug 20, 1942 – Jan 1945)	in school at Młodzieżowa 26 Street
3	Polenlager 10	Siemianowice Śląskie (Laurahutte)	at Donnersmarck manor, for ethnic Poles
4	Polenlager 11	Siemianowice Śląskie	forced labor camp for Jews
5	Polenlager 28	Orzesze (Orzesche)	at hospital buildings in Kolonia Marii
6	Polenlager 32	Bogumin (Polenlager Oderberg)	Jun 1942 – May 1945, with 104 Poles confirmed dead (42 men, 39 women, 23 children including 14 toddlers)
7	Polenlager 40	Frysztat, pow. cieszyński	Jun 1942 – Apr 1945, district of Frysztat
8	Polenlager 41	Piotrowice, pow. cieszyński	Jun 1942 – Apr 1945
9	Polenlager 56	Lyski (Lissek)	Jun 1942 – Nov 1943
10	Polenlager 58	Pszów (Pschow), pow. rybnicki	set up September 10, 1942 at a presbytery
11	Polenlager 63	Czechowice-Dziedzice (Tschechowitz-Dzieditz)	Jul 1942 – Jan 1945
12	Polenlager 75	Racibórz Strzelnica (Polenlager Ratibor)	closed Nov 1943, prisoners moved to Kietrz
13	Polenlager 82	Pogrzebień, pow. raciborski	with children captured in Aktion Oderberg
14	Polenlager 83	Dolní Benešov, Beneszów, pow. raciborski	Jun 1942 – Apr 1945
15	Polenlager 86	Otmuchów (Ottmachau), pow. grodkowski	until 1945
16	Polenlager 92	Kietrz (Polenlager Katscher)	from August 1942, at the Schaeffler textile factory
17	Polenlager 93	Gliwice Sobieszowice, pow. gliwicki	Aug 1942 – Apr 1944
18	Polenlager 95	Żory (Sohrau), pow. rybnicki	from August 1942
19	Polenlager 97	Rybnik, pow. rybnicki	in barracks by glider airstrip
20	Polenlager 168	Gorzyce (Polenlager Groß Gorschütz)	located at Lower Castle (Mały Zamek)
21	Polenlager 169	Kolonia Fryderyk, pow. raciborski	possibly Klein Gorschütz (?)
22	Polenlager 188	Piekary Śląskie (Deutsch Piekar)	from 1942
23	Polenlager 189	Zawiść (Zawisch), pow. pszczyński	Orzesze-Zawiść, at old Thiele-Winkler manor
24	Polenlager 209	Chorzów (Polenlager Königshütte)	in Królewska Huta neighborhood
25	Polenlager Tichau	Tychy	possibly Zawisch (?)
26	Polenlager Friedland	Mieroszów	until 1945
27	Polenlager Friedland 0/S	Korfantów	mid 1942 – Oct 1943
29	Polenlager Kattowitz	Katowice (Kattowitz-Eichenau 15, & Kattowitz-Idaweiche)	from July 1943
28	Polenlager Klein Gorschütz	Gorzyczki (Klein Gorschütz)	Jun 1942 – Nov 1943, in old coal-mine buildings
30	Polenlager Ost	Munich, Germany	Außenkommando
31	Polenlager Süd	Munich, Germany	Außenkommando
32	Polenlager HASAG	Leipzig, Germany	Bautzner Straße
33	Gefangenlager Skrochowitz	Skrochovice (Skrochowitz), pow. opawski, Sudetenland, Germany	from September 1939; in former sugar refinery

== See also ==
- "Polish death camp" controversy
