= Królówka, Orzesze =

Sołectwo in Orzesze, Silesian Voivodeship, Poland

Coordinates: 50.079515°N 18.788006°E

Królówka
- Sołectwo
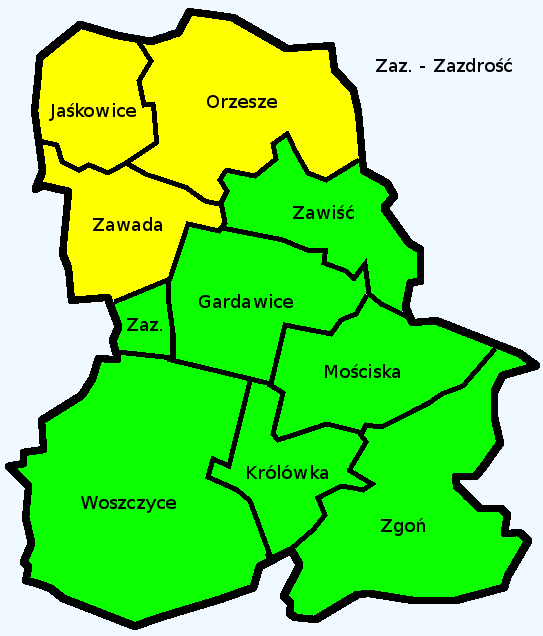
- Map of Orzesze showing showing Królówka to the central-south
- Country: Poland
- Voivodeship: Silesian
- County: Mikołów
- Town: Orzesze
- Incorporated: 1975

Area
  - Land: 5.6 km^{2} (2.2 sq mi)

Population
  - Total: 260
  - Density: 46/km^{2} (120/sq mi)
- SIMC: 0942015

Królówka (German: Kralowka) is a sołectwo in the south of Orzesze, Silesian Voivodeship, southern Poland. It was an independent village but was, as a part of gmina Gardawice, administratively merged into Orzesze in 1975. It has an area of 5.6 km² and about 260 inhabitants.

== History ==
The village was established in the 13th or 14th century. Historically it was tied with Woszczyce (common noble owners, Catholic parish, municipality, elementary school).

After World War I in the Upper Silesia plebiscite 151 out of 155 voters in Królówka voted in favour of joining Poland, against 4 opting for staying in Germany.
