= Gmina Ornontowice =

Gmina Ornontowice Ornontowice Commune
- Gmina
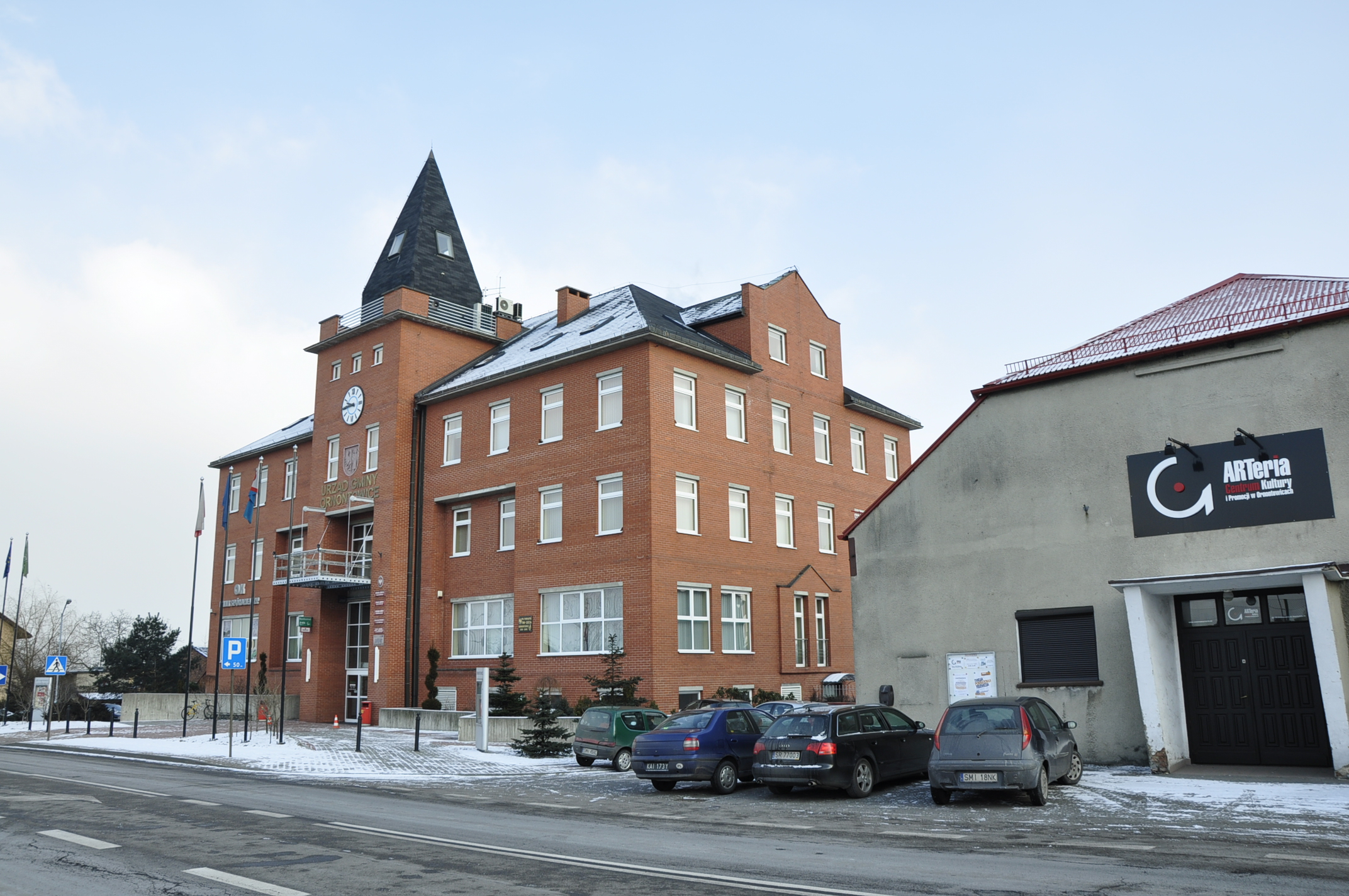
- The gmina office in Ornontowice

- Flag Coat of arms
- Interactive map of Gmina Ornontowice
- Coordinates (Ornontowice): 50°11′N 18°46′E
- Country: Poland
- Voivodeship: Silesian
- County: Mikołów
- Seat: Ornontowice

Area
  - Total: 15.1 km^{2} (5.8 sq mi)

Population (2019-06-30)
  - Total: 6,134
  - Density: 406/km^{2} (1,050/sq mi)
- Website: http://www.ornontowice.pl

Gmina Ornontowice is a rural gmina (administrative district) in Mikołów County, Silesian Voivodeship, in southern Poland. Its seat is the village of Ornontowice, which lies approximately 10 kilometres (6 mi) west of Mikołów and 19 km (12 mi) south-west of the regional capital Katowice.

The gmina covers an area of 15.1 square kilometres (5.8 sq mi), and as of 2019 its total population is 6,134.

== Neighbouring gminas ==
Gmina Ornontowice is bordered by the towns of Mikołów and Orzesze, and by the gminas of Czerwionka-Leszczyny and Gierałtowice.
