= Orzesze =

Orzesze Ôrzysze
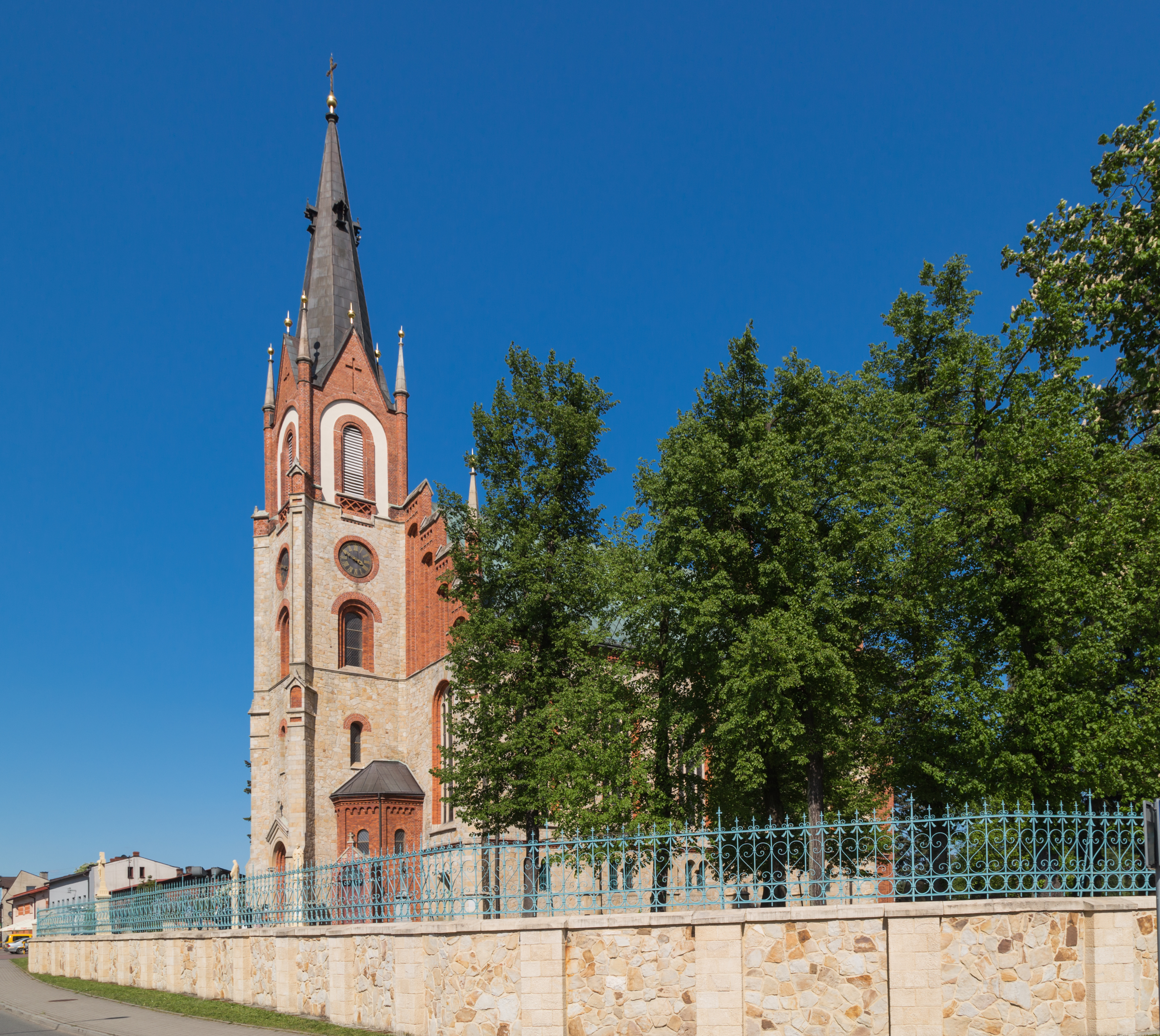
- Church of Saints Peter and Paul

- Coat of arms

- Location within Poland
- Coordinates: 50°9′N 18°45′E
- Country: Poland
- Voivodeship: Silesian
- County: Mikołów
- Gmina: Orzesze (urban gmina)
- Town rights: 1962

Government
  - Mayor: Janusz Ojczyznosław

Area
  - City: 83.79 km^{2} (32.35 sq mi)

Population (2019-06-30)
  - City: 21,043
  - Density: 251.1/km^{2} (650.4/sq mi)
  - Urban: 2,746,000
  - Metro: 5,294,000
- Time zone: UTC+1 (CET)
  - Summer (DST): UTC+2 (CEST)
- Postal code: 43-180
- Area code: +48 32
- Car plates: SMI
- Website: http://www.orzesze.pl

Orzesze [ɔˈʐɛʂɛ] (German: Orzesche; Silesian: Ôrzysze) is a town in Silesia in southern Poland, near Katowice. Borders on the Metropolis GZM – metropolis with a population of 2 million. Located in the Silesian Highlands.

It is situated in the Silesian Voivodeship since its formation in 1999, previously in Katowice Voivodeship, and before then, of the Autonomous Silesian Voivodeship. Orzesze is one of the towns of the 2.7 million conurbation – Katowice urban area and within a greater Katowice-Ostrava metropolitan area populated by about 5,294,000 people. The population of the town is 21,043 as of 2019.

== Districts ==
Apart from the town proper and its two districts (Jaśkowice and Zawada) Orzesze has seven sołectwos:

- Gardawice
- Królówka
- Mościska
- Zawiść
- Zazdrość
- Zgoń
- Woszczyce

== History ==
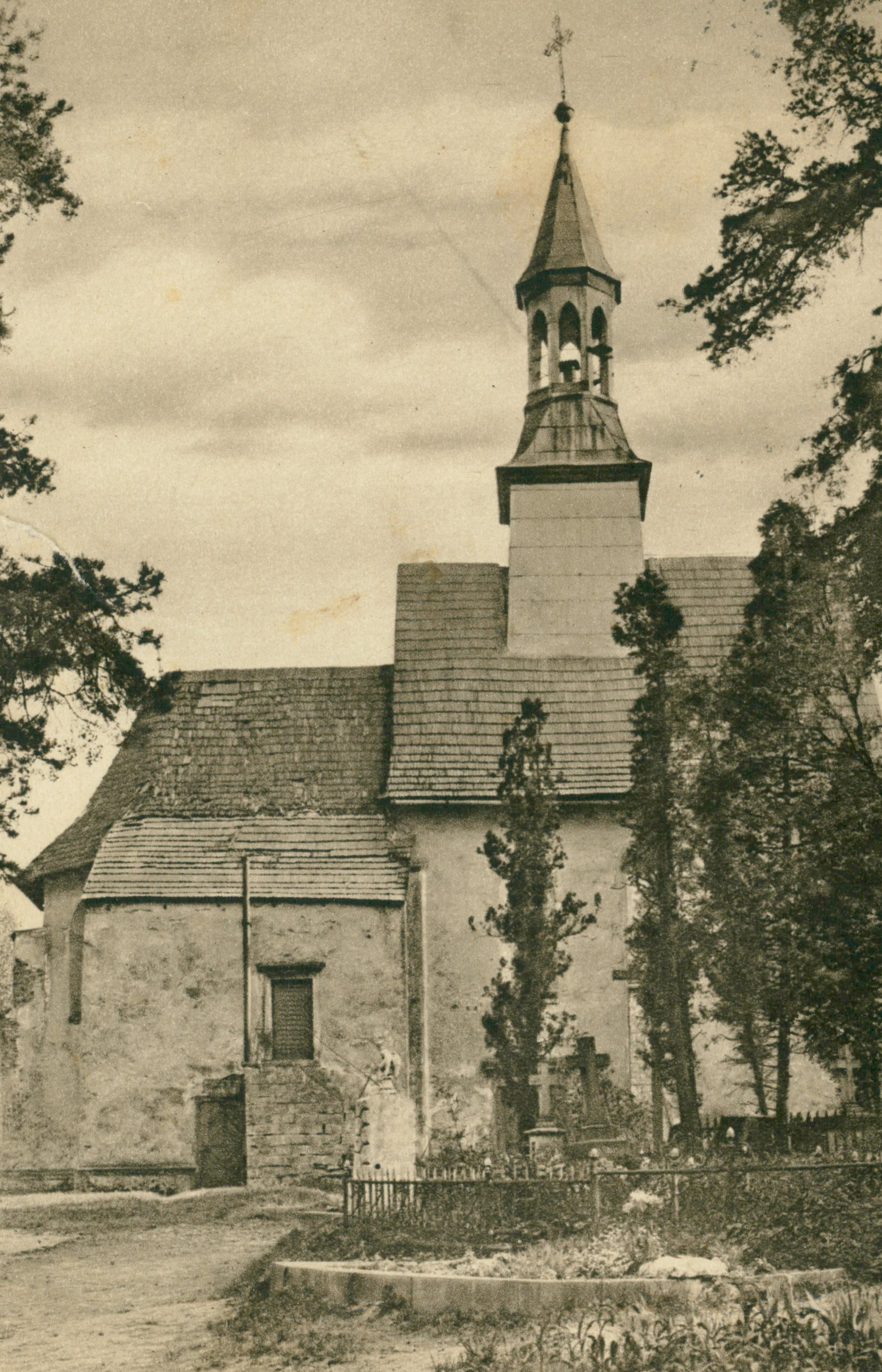
Saint Lawrence church in the mid-20th century

Orzesze dates back to the Middle Ages, however, for centuries it remained a village, as it was not granted town rights until 1962.

During the joint German-Soviet invasion of Poland, which started World War II, the town was captured by Germany on September 3, 1939 after Polish defense. The Germans immediately carried out mass arrests of Polish activists, scouts and insurgents of the Silesian Uprisings of 1919–1921. On September 3, Wehrmacht troops massacred 12 Poles in the present-day districts (sołectwos) of Zawiść and Zgoń, and on September 4, the Freikorps massacred 29 Poles from Orzesze in the nearby Pasternik forest. The victims of the latter massacre were 28 men (foresters, railwaymen, workers, farmers, retirees, a musician, editor, photographer, teacher, local official, barber, miner, janitor) and 1 woman. On September 8, 1939, German troops executed Józef Szindler, the commander of the local insurgent unit. The Polenlager No. 28, a forced labour camp for Poles, was established in the town in 1942. German occupation ended in 1945.

== Education ==
In 1820, the first school in a renovated farm was funded. In 1838, due to development of industry number of inhabitants started to grow rapidly. A new school was built, in which 389 children were taught in 2 rooms. In 1868, a new school arose in the building of the current post office. In that year, Lutherans started education in their own school. In 1903, a modern school was built.

== Neighbouring communes ==
Czerwionka-Leszczyny, Łaziska Górne, Mikołów, Ornontowice, Suszec, Wyry, Kobiór, Żory.
