= Gorzyczki, Silesian Voivodeship =

Gorzyczki
- Village
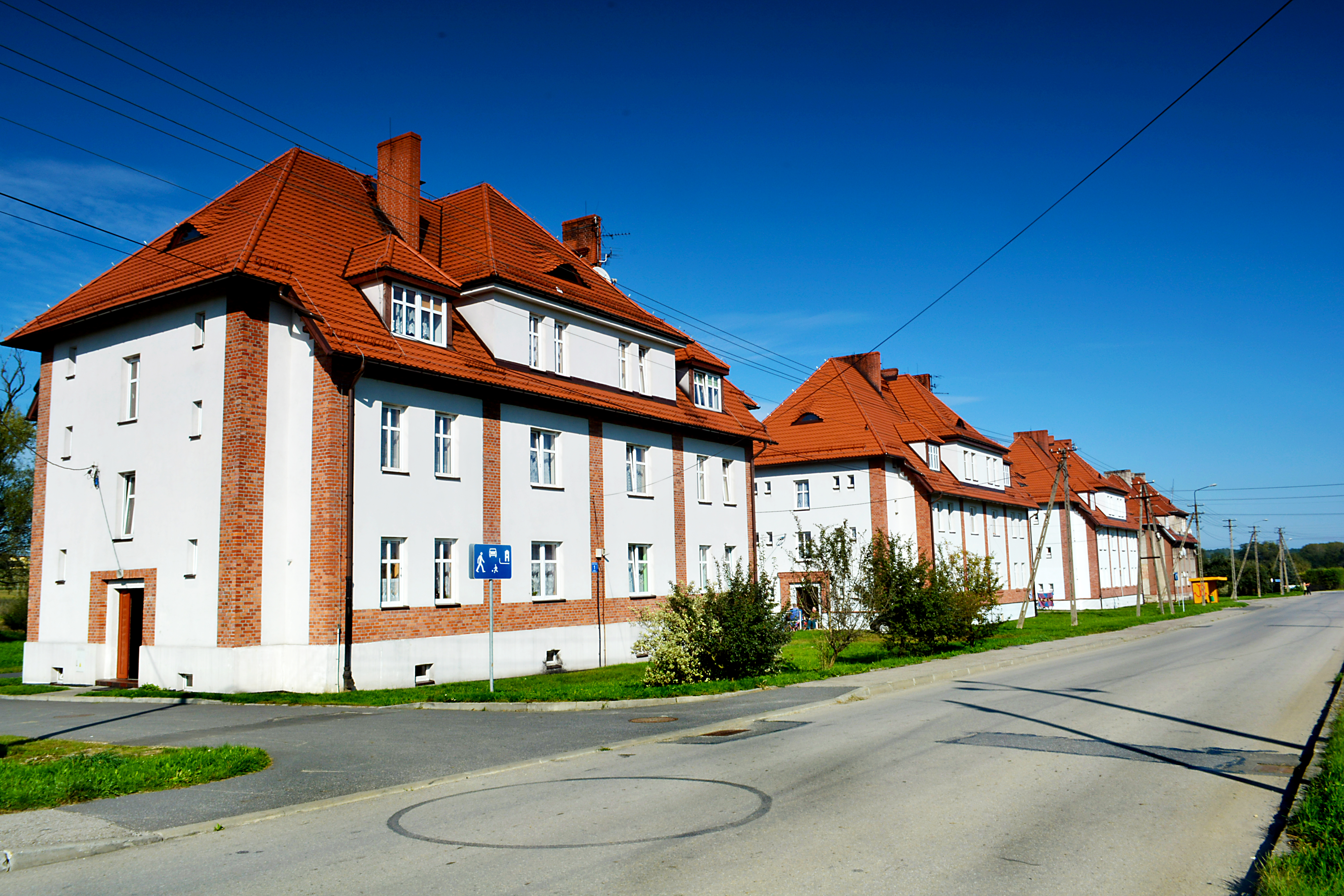
- Old houses in Gorzyczki

- Coat of arms

- Location within Poland
- Coordinates: 49°56′53″N 18°24′17″E
- Country: Poland
- Voivodeship: Silesian
- County: Wodzisław
- Gmina: Gorzyce
- First mentioned: 1229

Government
  - Mayor: Henryk Grzegoszczyk
- Area: 6.69 km^{2} (2.58 sq mi)
- Population: 1,593
  - Density: 238/km^{2} (617/sq mi)
- Time zone: UTC+1 (CET)
  - Summer (DST): UTC+2 (CEST)
- Car plates: SWD

Gorzyczki [ɡɔˈʐɨt͡ʂki] is a village in Gmina Gorzyce, Wodzisław County, Silesian Voivodeship in southern Poland. It is situated on the border with the Czech Republic, 10 kilometers south from the county seat Wodzisław Śląski.

The A1 motorway, which runs from the port city of Gdańsk in the north, ends on the border in Gorzyczki, where it is connected to the Czech D1 motorway.

== History ==
In the Middle Ages, Gorzyczki was part of Piast-ruled Poland and was the location of a motte-and-bailey castle. It is an archaeological site at which traces of human activity from the Stone Age, Bronze Age, Iron Age, and antiquity were found.

During the German occupation (World War II), it was the location of the Polenlager 169, a concentration camp for Poles. It held the expelled Poles who didn't sign a volkslist. It was operated on the base of the "Fryderyk" coal mine facilities in 1942–1945 in Kolonia Fryderyk.

== Notable people ==
- Jan Piprek (1887–1970), Polish independence activist and insurgent, philologist, lecturer, member of the Polish resistance movement and prisoner of the Pawiak prison during the World War II German occupation of Poland
- Teresa Glenc (born 1958), Polish politician, parliamentarian, teacher, member of the Polish Scouting and Guiding Association
- Andrzej Andrzejczak (born 1960), Polish politician, parliamentarian
