= Zgoń =

- Sołectwo of Orzesze
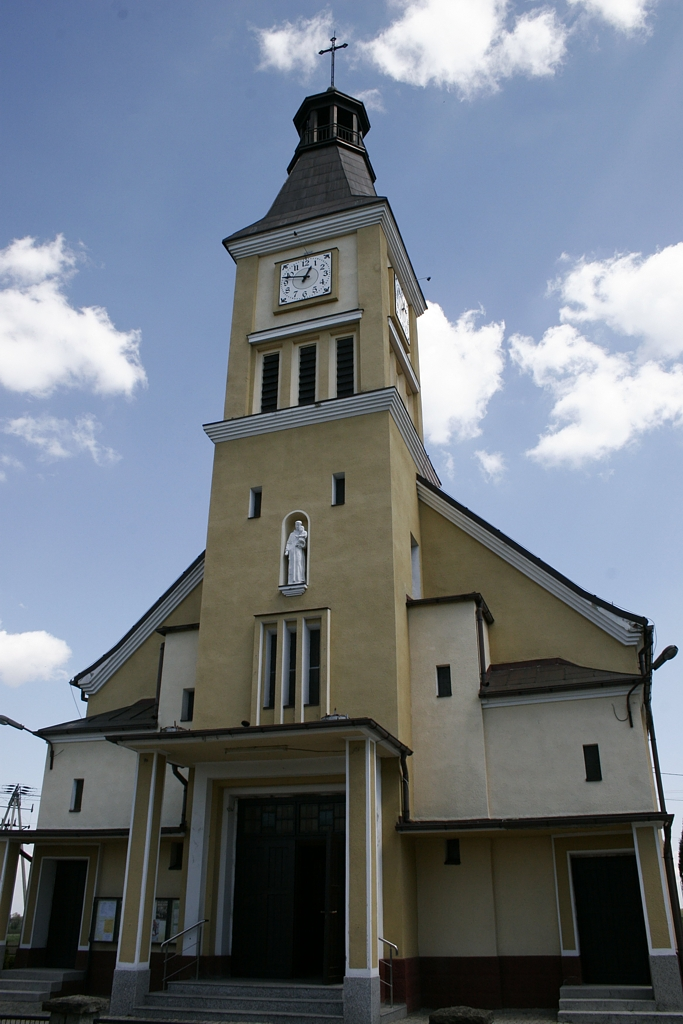
- Saint Anthony of Padua church

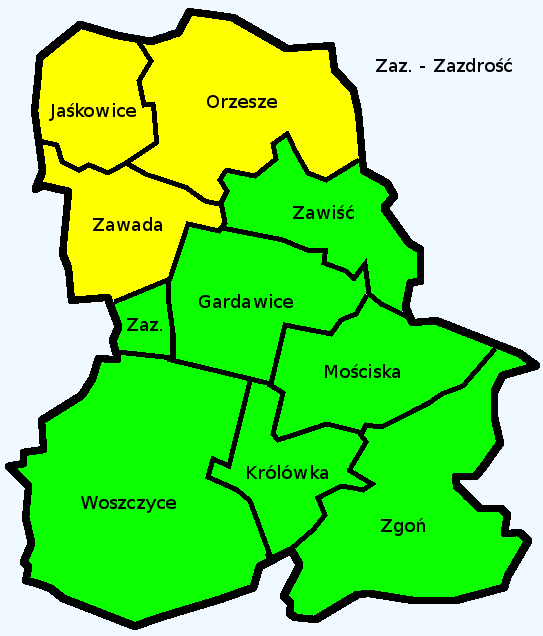
- Map of Orzesze
- Coordinates: 50°04′55″N 18°49′46″E
- Country: Poland
- Voivodeship: Silesian
- County: Mikołów
- Gmina/Town: Orzesze
- Within town limits: 1975

Area
  - Total: 13.3 km^{2} (5.1 sq mi)

Population
  - Total: 1,133
  - Density: 85.2/km^{2} (221/sq mi)
- Time zone: UTC+1 (CET)
  - Summer (DST): UTC+2 (CEST)
- Vehicle registration: SMI

Zgoń is a sołectwo in the south east of Orzesze, Silesian Voivodeship, southern Poland. It was an independent village but as a part of gmina Gardawice was administratively merged into Orzesze in 1975. It has an area of 13.3 km^{2} and about 1,133 inhabitants.

== History ==
The village existed already in the 14th century.

During the political upheaval caused by Matthias Corvinus the land around Pszczyna was overtaken by Casimir II, Duke of Cieszyn, who sold it in 1517 to the Hungarian magnates of the Thurzó family, forming the Pless state country. In the accompanying sales document issued on 21 February 1517 the village was mentioned as Zgony. The Kingdom of Bohemia in 1526 became part of the Habsburg monarchy. In the War of the Austrian Succession in the mid-18th century most of Silesia was conquered by the Kingdom of Prussia, including the village, and in 1871 it became part of Germany.

After World War I in the Upper Silesia plebiscite 404 out of 421 voters in Zgoń voted in favour of reintegrating with Poland, which just regained independence, against 17 opting for staying in Germany.

Shortly after capturing the settlement during the invasion of Poland, which started World War II, German troops committed a massacre of eight Polish defenders (seven men and one woman) in Zgoń on September 3, 1939 (see Nazi crimes against the Polish nation). German occupation ended in 1945.
