= Gostyń, Silesian Voivodeship =

Gostyń
- Village
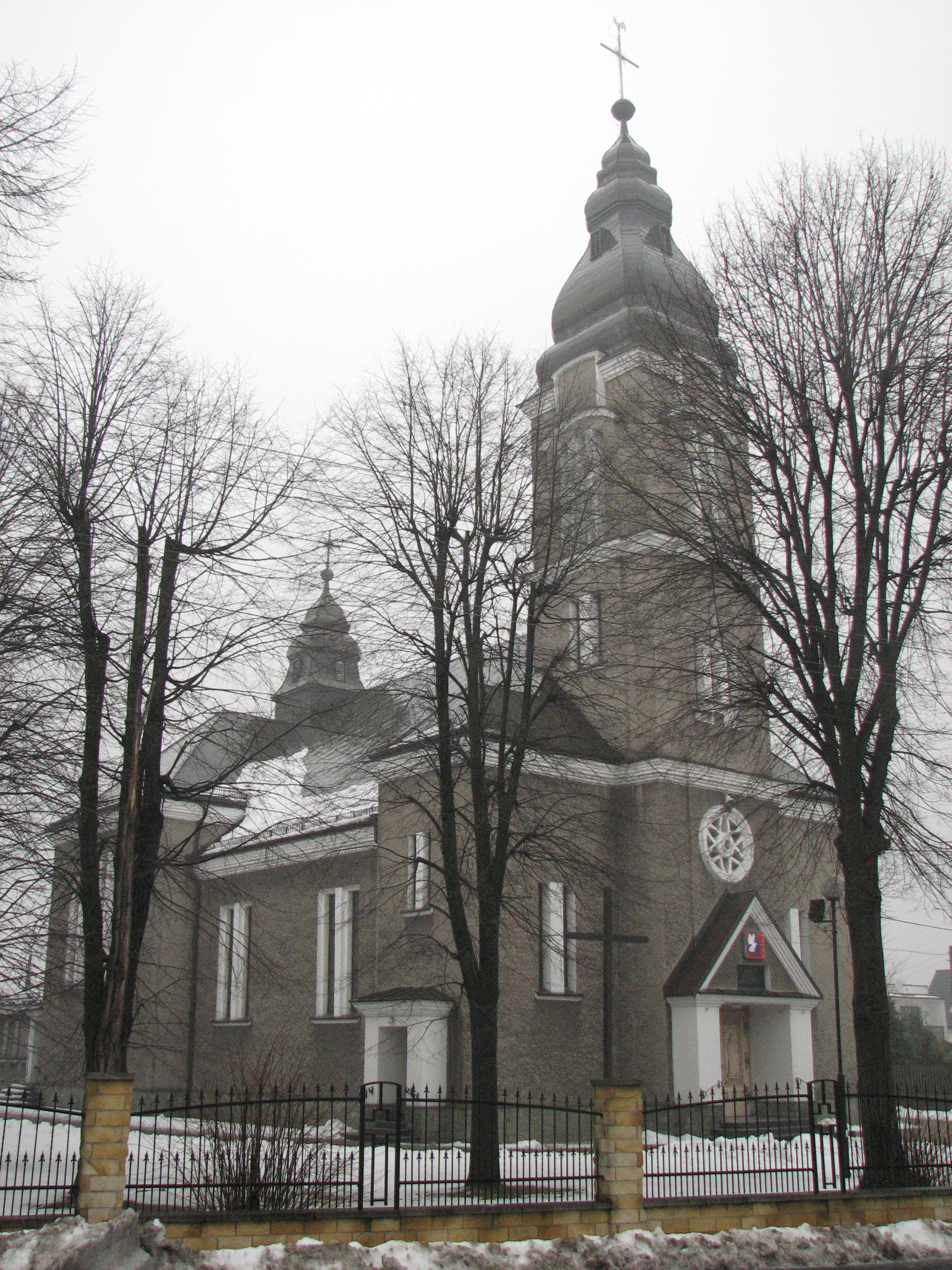
- Saints Peter and Paul church in Gostyń

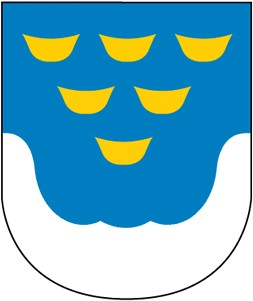
- Coat of arms

- Location within Poland
- Coordinates: 50°6′12″N 18°52′58″E
- Country: Poland
- Voivodeship: Silesian
- County: Mikołów
- Gmina: Wyry

Population
  - Total: 3,400
- Time zone: UTC+1 (CET)
  - Summer (DST): UTC+2 (CEST)
- Vehicle registration: SMI

Gostyń ([ˈɡɔstɨɲ]) is a village in the administrative district of Gmina Wyry, within Mikołów County, Silesian Voivodeship, in southern Poland.

== History ==
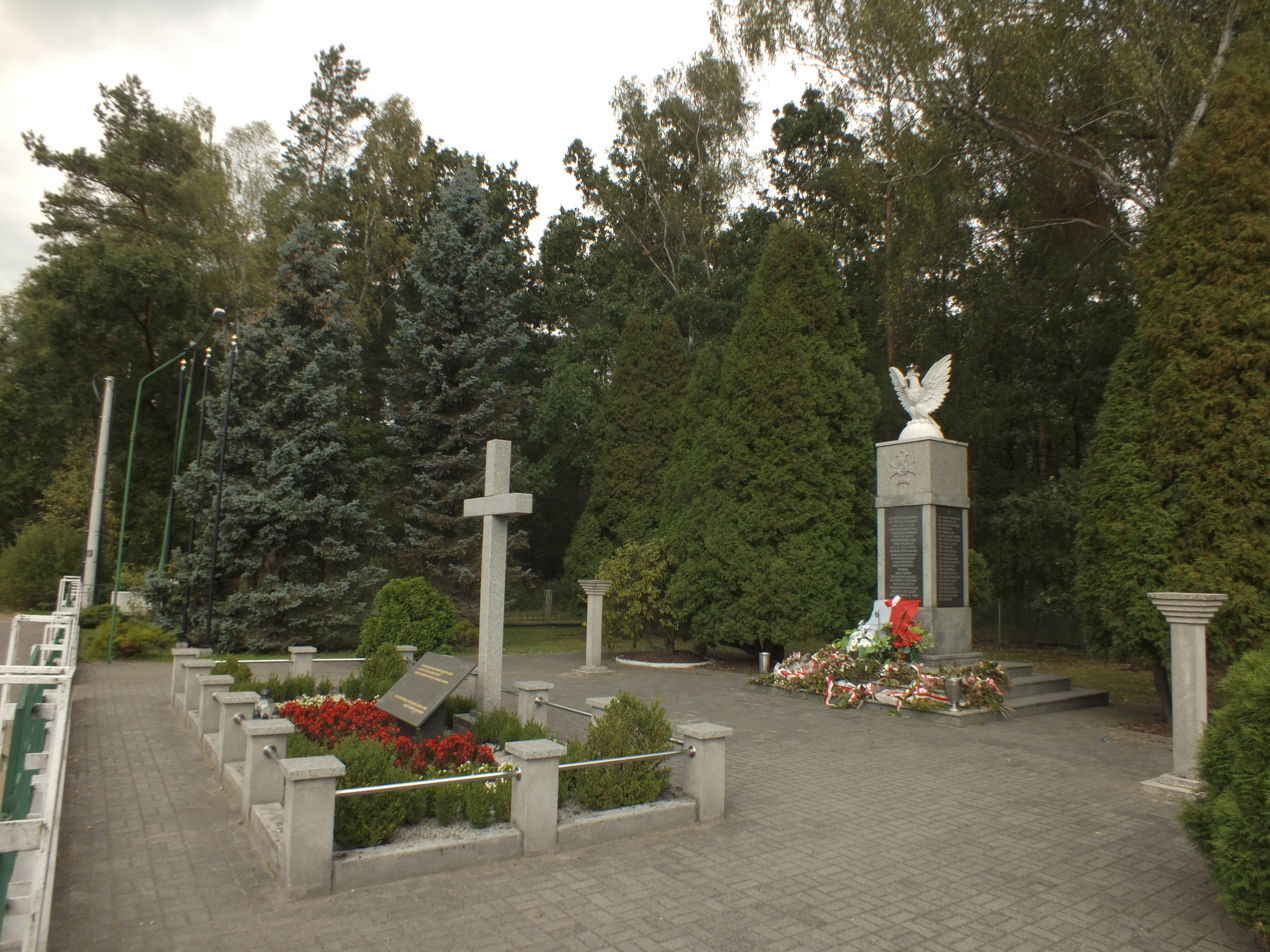
Monument commemorating the 1939 battle

Gostyń was first established in the 13th or 14th century, when it was part of Piast-ruled fragmented Poland. The village was abandoned in 1474, and reestablished in 1575.

Part of Germany from 1871, in 1872 as part of Germanisation policies, German was introduced as a lecture language in the local school. Gostyń was reintegrated with Poland, after the country regained independence in 1918 and the majority of the population voted for reintegration with Poland in the Upper Silesia plebiscite in 1921 (585 votes for Poland, 39 for Germany). In the first days of the invasion of Poland, which started World War II, on September 1–3, 1939, Gostyń was the site of fierce Polish defense against invading Germany, in which 60% of the village was destroyed. On September 2, 1939, the Germans murdered 13 Polish inhabitants of the village, including 4 women and the local parish priest. After the defeat of Germany in 1945, the village was restored to Poland and a monument was erected at the site of the 1939 battle.

There are two churches in the village: the Saints Peter and Paul church and the Exaltation of the Holy Cross church.
