= Gardawice =

Sołectwo in Orzesze, Silesian Voivodeship, Poland

Coordinates: 50.110963°N 18.789507°E

- Sołectwo
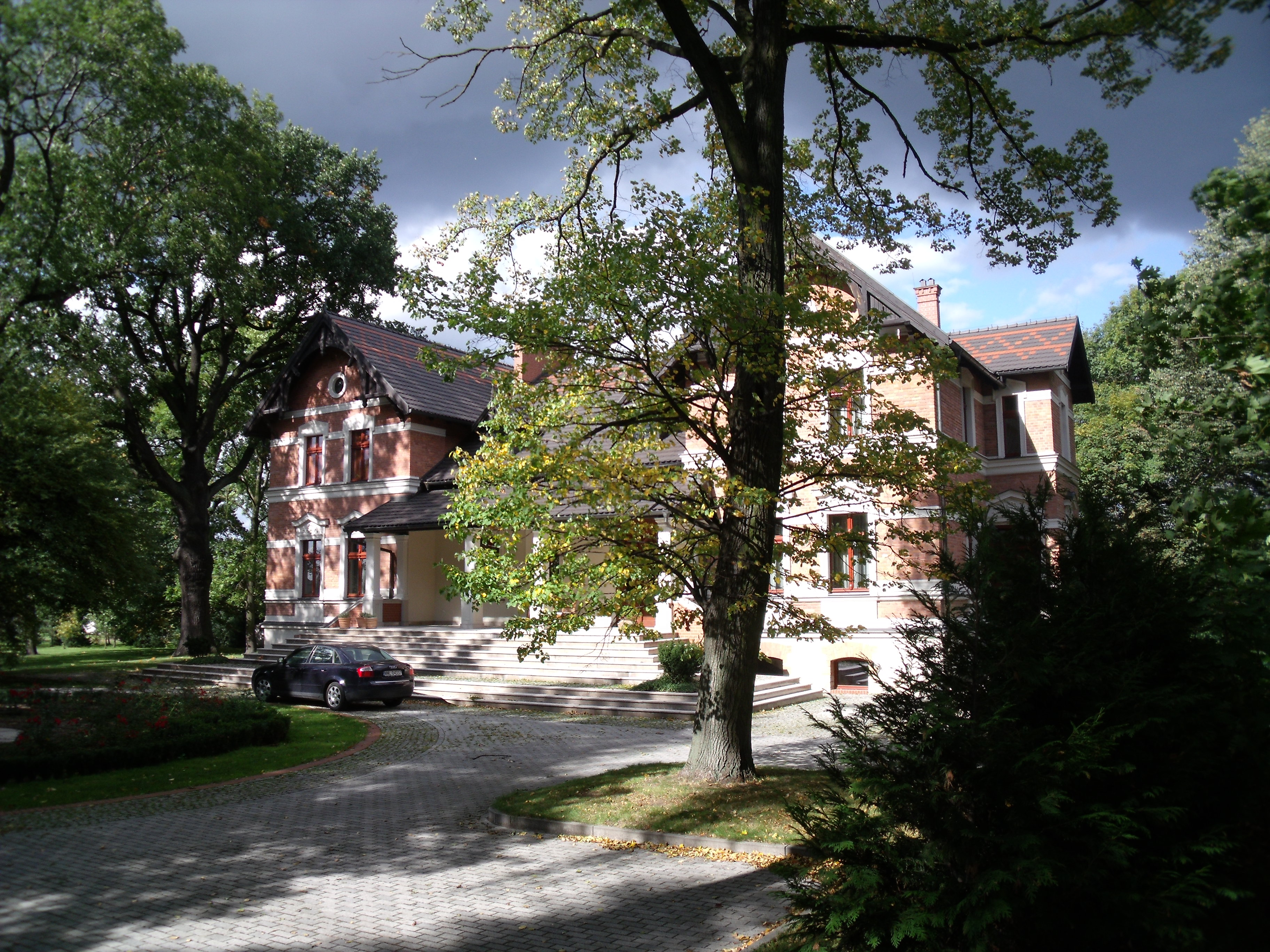
- Manor house in Gardawice

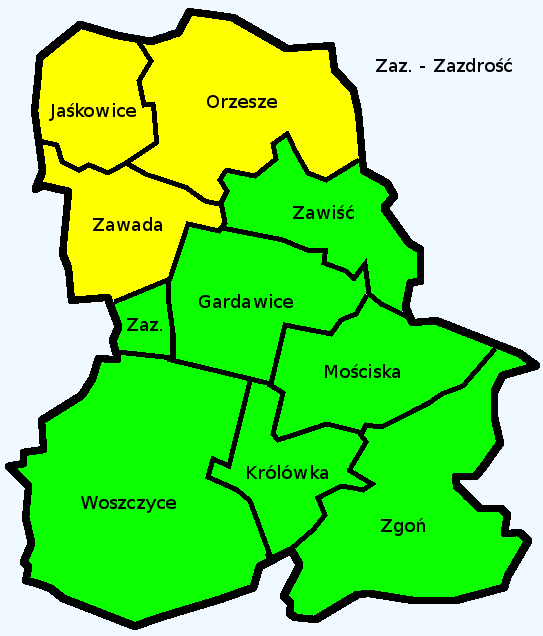
- Map of Orzesze showing showing Gardawice in the centre
- Country: Poland
- Voivodeship: Silesian
- County: Mikołów
- Town: Orzesze
- Incorporated: 1975

Area
  - Land: 7.7 km^{2} (3.0 sq mi)

Population
  - Total: 1,940
  - Density: 250/km^{2} (650/sq mi)
- SIMC: 0941990

Gardawice (German: Gardawitz) is a sołectwo of Orzesze, Silesian Voivodeship, southern Poland. It was formerly an independent village and during the years 1945-1954 and 1973-1975 it was the seat of a gmina, which was administratively merged into Orzesze in 1975. It has an area of 7.7 km² and about 1940 inhabitants.

== History ==
The village already existed in the 14th century.

After World War I, in the Upper Silesia plebiscite, 419 out of 507 voters in Gardawice voted in favour of joining Poland, against 84 opting for staying in the Weimar Republic.

In 1945 it became a seat of a gmina that also encompassed Królówka, Woszczyce, Zawiść, Zazdrość and Zgoń.
