= Bolesław Śmiały =

Bolesław Śmiały may refer to:

- Bolesław II Śmiały (ca. 1041 or 1042 – 1081 or 1082), Duke of Poland
- Bolesław Śmiały (film), a 1971 Polish historical film directed by Witold Lesiewicz
- Bolesław Śmiały Coal Mine, mine in Łaziska Górne, Silesian Voivodeship, Poland
