= Teresa Glenc =

Polish politician (born 1958)

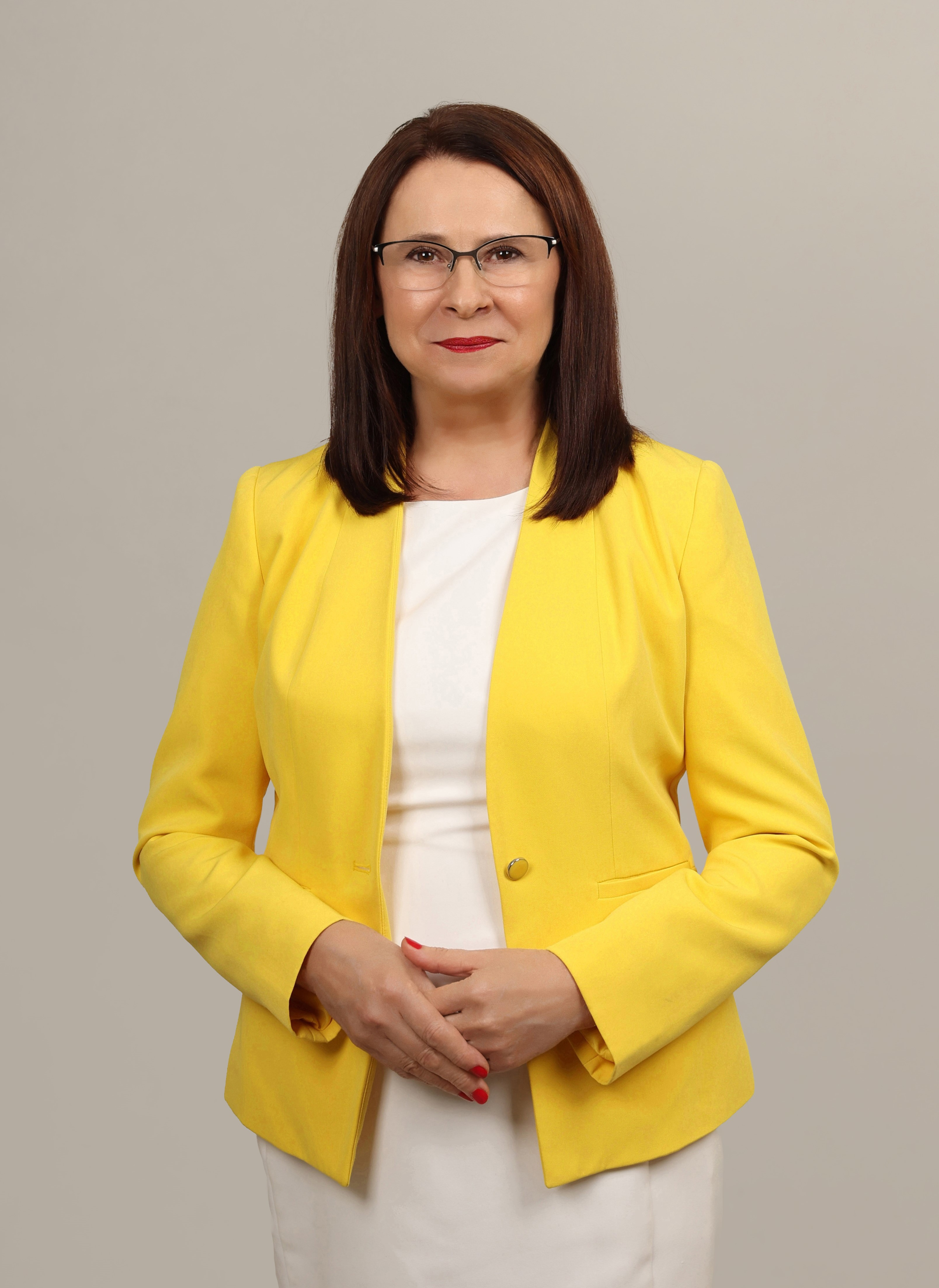

Member of the Sejm

Personal details
- Born: 27 May 1958 (age 67) Gorzyczki, Silesian Voivodeship

Teresa Glenc (born 27 May 1958) is a Polish politician. She was elected to the Sejm (9th term) representing the constituency of Bielsko-Biała II. She previously also served in the 8th term of the Sejm (2015–2019).
