= Budryk Coal Mine =

Coal mine in Silesia

Budryk coal mine
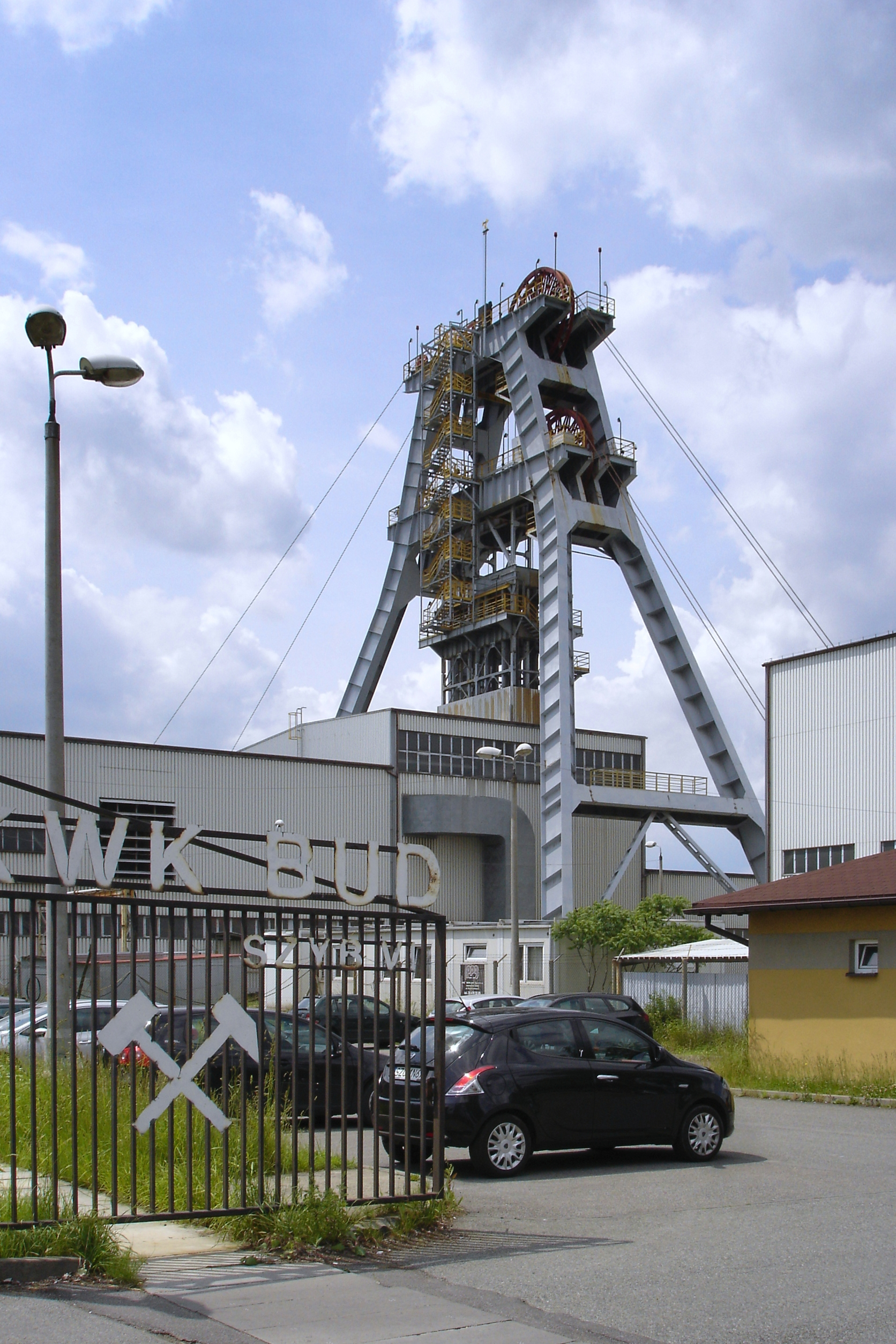
- Shaft tower 6

- Location in Poland

Location
- Location: Ornontowice, Silesian Voivodeship, Poland; 50°10′26″N 018°45′32″E

Production
- Products: Coal
- Production: 5,000,000

History
- Opened: 1979

Owner
- Company: Jastrzębska Spółka Węglowa
- Website: Official website

The Budryk coal mine is a large mine in the south of Poland in Ornontowice, Silesian Voivodeship, 320 km south-west of the capital, Warsaw. Budryk represents one of the largest coal reserve in Poland having estimated reserves of 235.5 million tonnes of coal. The annual coal production is around 5 million tonnes.
