= Zawiść, Orzesze =

Zawiść
- Sołectwo of Orzesze
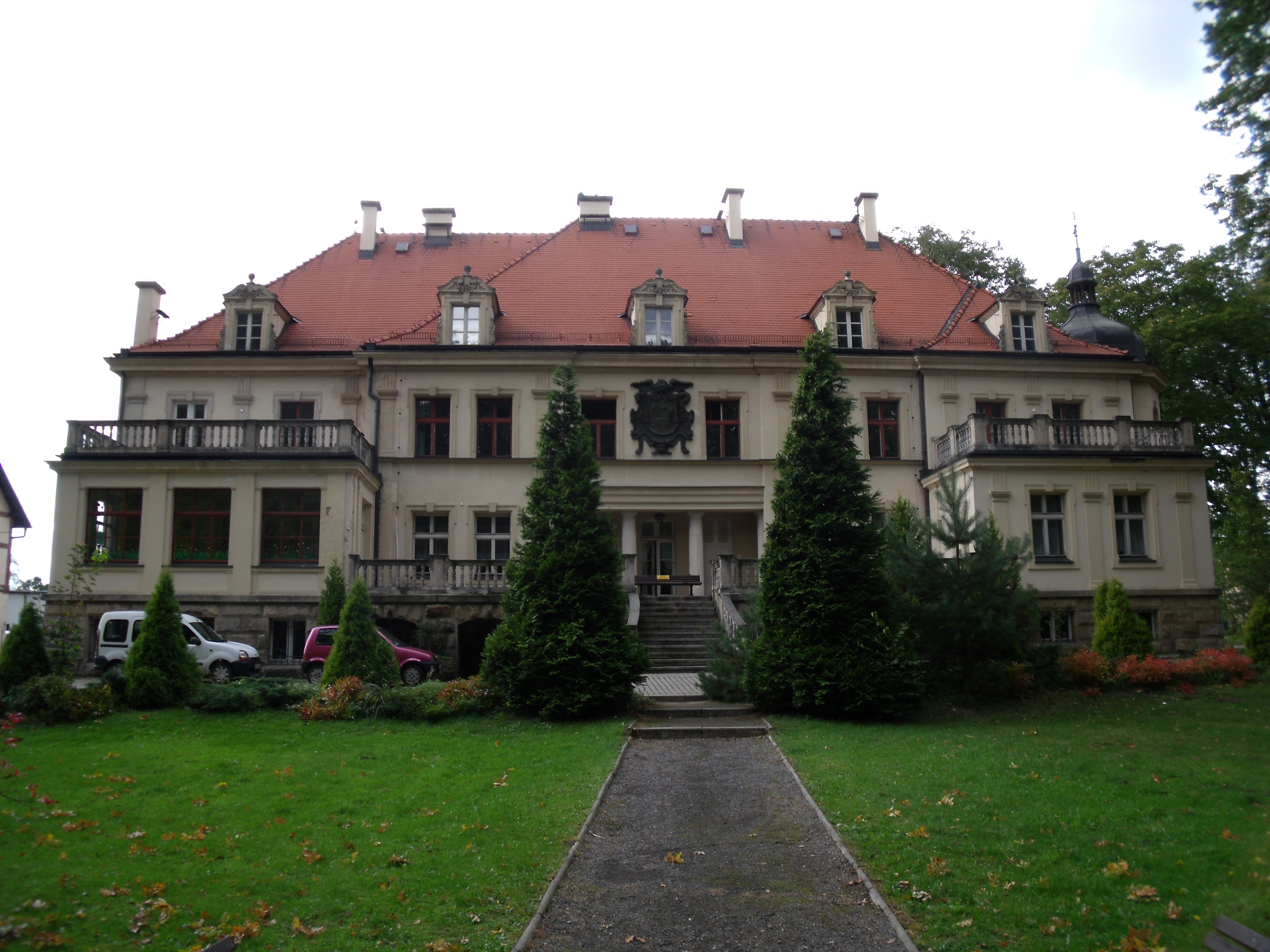
- Baroque palace in Zawiść

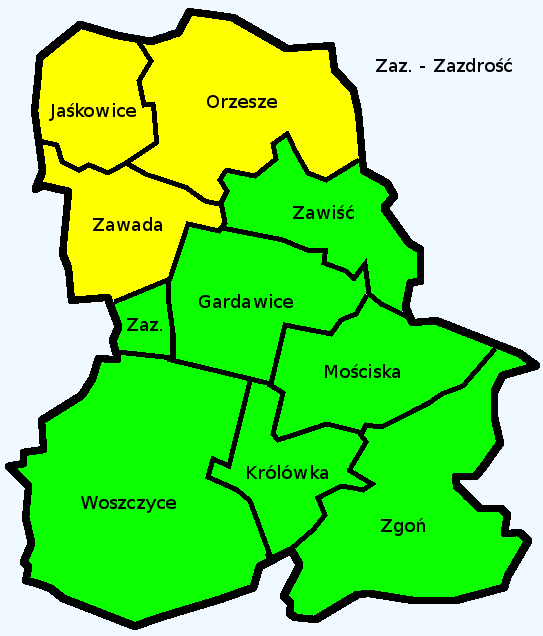
- Map of Orzesze
- Coordinates: 50°07′48″N 18°47′24″E
- Country: Poland
- Voivodeship: Silesian
- County: Mikołów
- Gmina/Town: Orzesze
- Within town limits: 1975

Area
  - Total: 6.6 km^{2} (2.5 sq mi)

Population
  - Total: 1,933
  - Density: 290/km^{2} (760/sq mi)
- Time zone: UTC+1 (CET)
  - Summer (DST): UTC+2 (CEST)
- Vehicle registration: SMI

Zawiść (German: Zawisc) is a sołectwo in the east of Orzesze, Silesian Voivodeship, southern Poland. It was an independent village but as a part of gmina Gardawice was administratively merged into Orzesze in 1975. It has an area of 6.6 km^{2} and about 1,933 inhabitants.

== History ==
The village could have been first mentioned as Czawsch among villages given by John II, Duke of Opava-Ratibor to his wife, Helena, in the early 15th century. The first certain mention was in 1574, when it was sold by Wawrzyniec Trach to Jerzy Orzeski.

In the years 1733-1914 a glass mill Ernestyna operated here. In the 18th century also two brick factories and a coal mine. A palace was also built in the time.

In the 18th century the village was annexed by Prussia, and in 1871 it became part of Germany. After World War I in the Upper Silesia plebiscite 199 out of 279 voters in Zawiść voted in favour of reintegrating with Poland, which just regained independence, against 79 opting for staying in Germany.

Shortly after capturing the settlement during the invasion of Poland, which started World War II, German troops murdered several Polish defenders in Zawiść on September 3, 1939 (see Nazi crimes against the Polish nation). German occupation ended in 1945.
