= Zazdrość, Orzesze =

Coordinates: 50.106671°N 18.760472°E

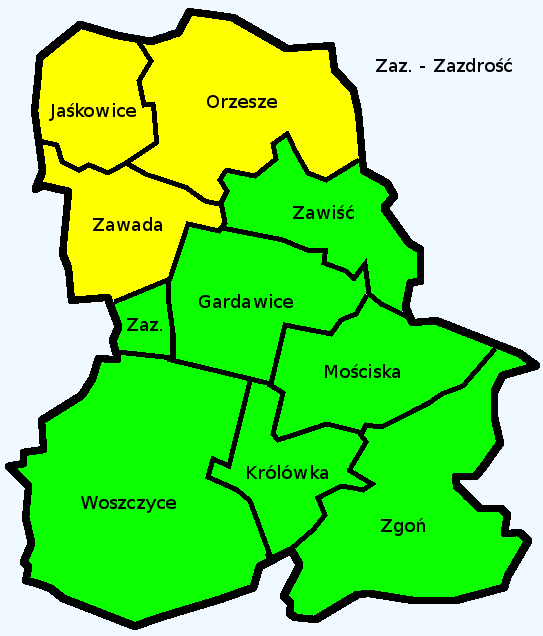
Map of Orzesze

Zazdrość (German: Zasdrose) is a sołectwo in the west of Orzesze, Silesian Voivodeship, southern Poland. It was an independent village but as a part of gmina Gardawice was administratively merged into Orzesze in 1975. It has an area of 1.5 km^{2} and about 1,203 inhabitants.

== History ==
The village was founded in the course of the Frederician colonization after 1773 by von Kalkreuth, the owner of a nearby Zawada. 13 families settled here initially.

After World War I in the Upper Silesia plebiscite 222 out of 273 voters in Zazdrość voted in favour of joining Poland, against 50 opting for staying in Germany.
