= Woszczyce =

- Sołectwo of Orzesze
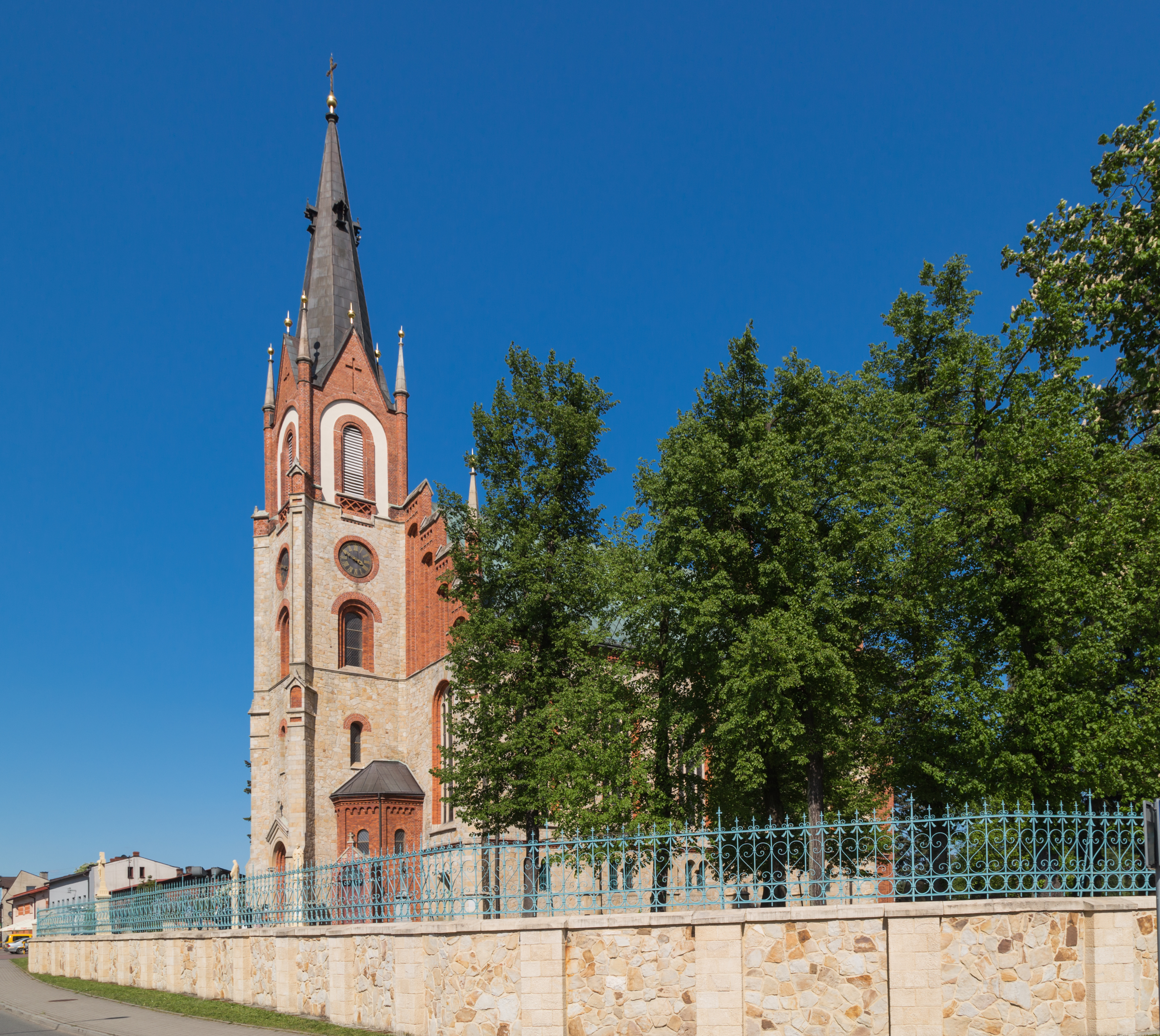
- Saints Peter and Paul church

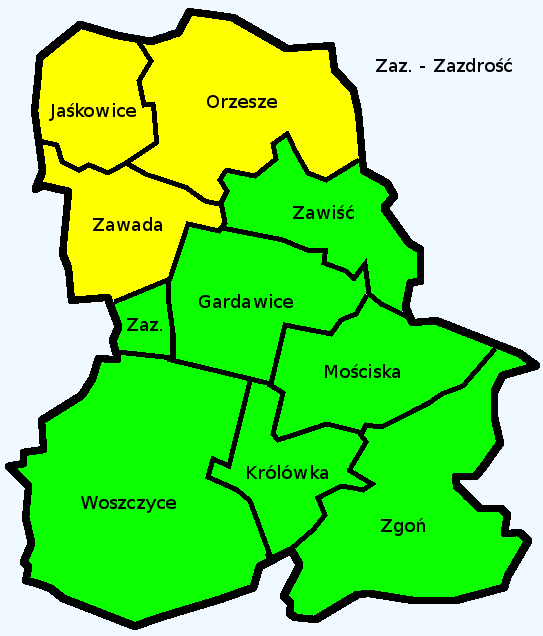
- Map of Orzesze
- Coordinates: 50°04′58″N 18°45′25″E
- Country: Poland
- Voivodeship: Silesian
- County: Mikołów
- Gmina/Town: Orzesze
- Within town limits: 1975
- Time zone: UTC+1 (CET)
  - Summer (DST): UTC+2 (CEST)
- Vehicle registration: SMI

Woszczyce (German: Woschczytz) is a sołectwo in the south west of Orzesze, Silesian Voivodeship, southern Poland. It has an area of 18.7 km^{2} and about 1,230 inhabitants.

== History ==
It is the oldest settlement on the territory of Orzesze. According to a chronicle from the 16th century, a local Catholic parish was established already in the 11th century. The village was mentioned several times in the 13th century, due to a Cistercian monastery which was to be raised in the village in 1237, which was foiled by the First Mongol invasion of Poland in 1241. Eventually it was never finished (instead the monastery was built in Rudy Raciborskie). It was then mentioned in 1326 in the register of Peter's Pence payment among Catholic parishes of Oświęcim deanery of the Diocese of Kraków as Woskic.

During the political upheaval caused by Matthias Corvinus the land around Pszczyna was overtaken by Casimir II, Duke of Cieszyn, who sold it in 1517 to the Hungarian magnates of the Thurzó family, forming the Pless state country. In the accompanying sales document issued on 21 February 1517 the village was mentioned as Wossticzeo. The Kingdom of Bohemia in 1526 became part of the Habsburg monarchy. In the Thirty Years War the village was completely destroyed and ceased to function. In the War of the Austrian Succession most of Silesia was conquered by the Kingdom of Prussia, including the village.

After World War I in the Upper Silesia plebiscite 186 out of 299 inhabitants voted in favour of rejoining Poland, against 113 for Germany. It became later a part of Silesian Voivodeship, Second Polish Republic.

Following the German-Soviet invasion of Poland, which started World War II, it was annexed by Nazi Germany. Two local Polish policemen were murdered by the Russians in the Katyn massacre in 1940. After the war it was restored to Poland.

It was an independent village but was, as a part of gmina Gardawice, administratively merged into Orzesze in 1975.
