= Bolesław Śmiały Coal Mine =

Coal mine in Łaziska Górne, Poland

Bolesław Śmiały coal mine
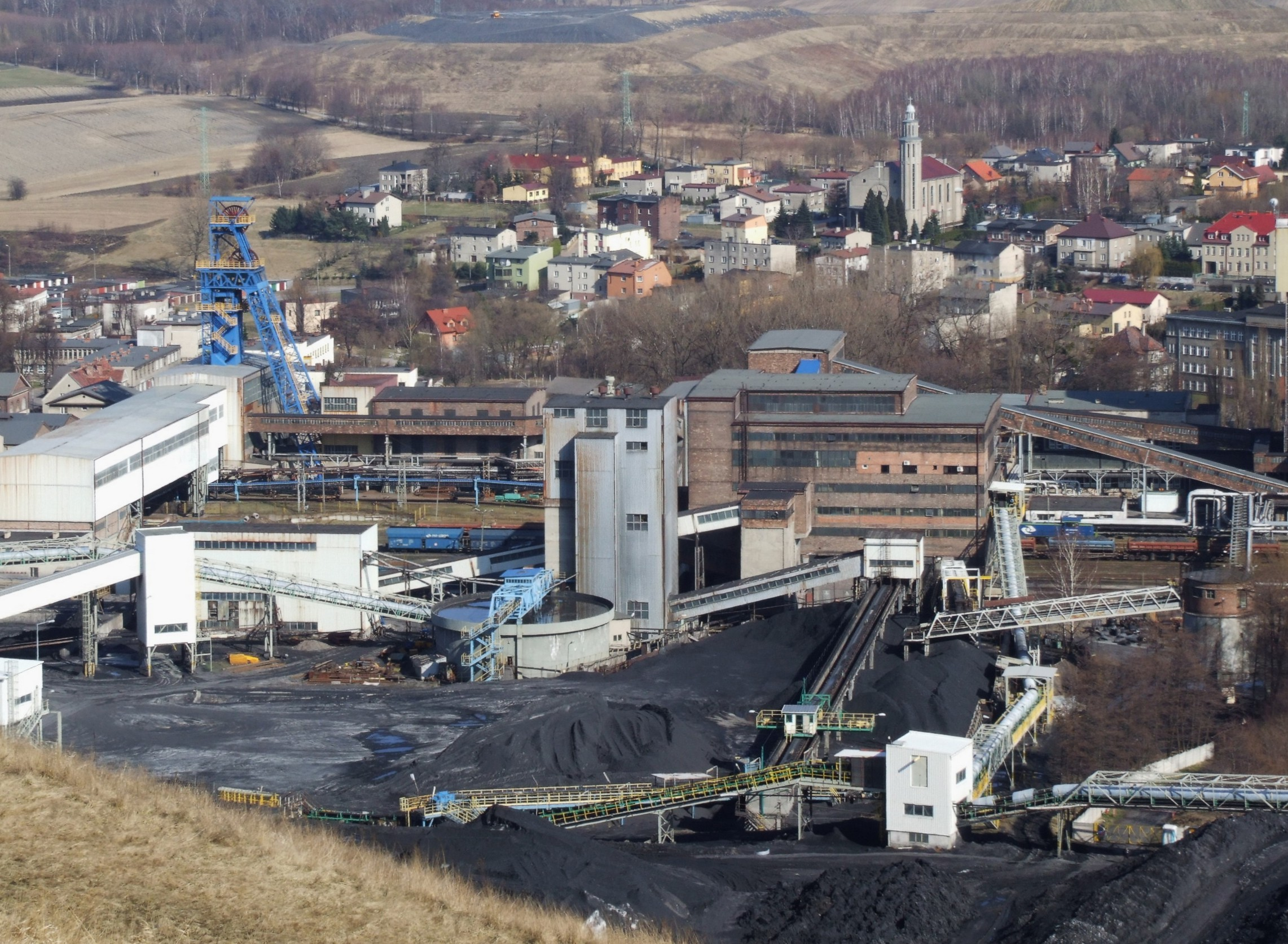

- Location in Poland
- Location: Łaziska Górne, Silesian Voivodeship, Poland; 50°08′28″N 018°51′54″E
- Products: Coal
- Production: 2,136,000
- Opened: 2000
- Company: Polska Grupa Górnicza

The Bolesław Śmiały coal mine is a large mine in the south of Poland in Łaziska Górne, Silesian Voivodeship, 172 km south-west of the capital, Warsaw. Bolesław Śmiały represents one of the largest coal reserve in Poland having estimated reserves of 50 million tonnes of coal. The annual coal production is around 2.13 million tonnes.
