= Wyry =

- Village
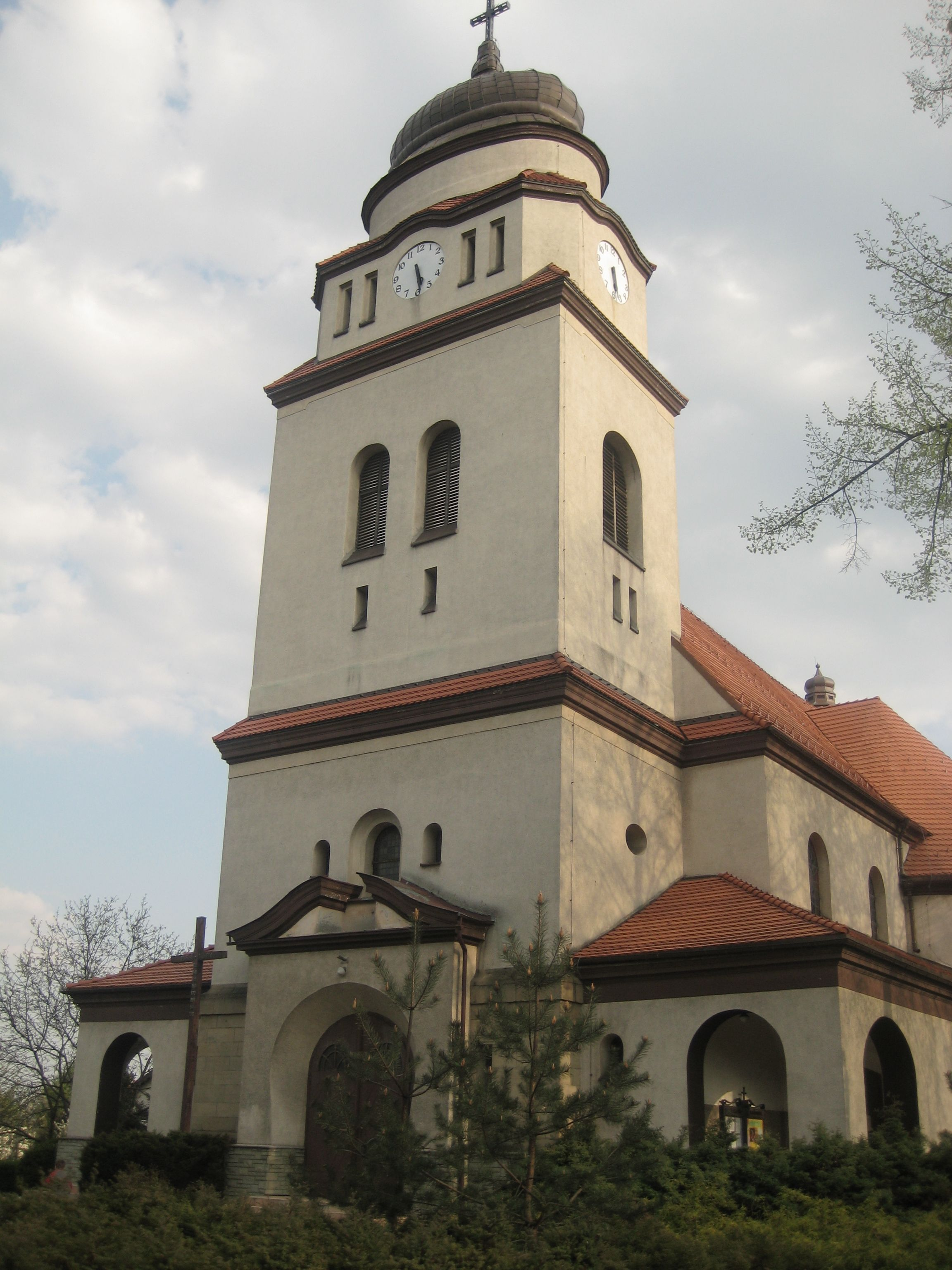
- Sacred Heart church in Wyry

- Location within Poland
- Coordinates: 50°8′N 18°55′E
- Country: Poland
- Voivodeship: Silesian
- County: Mikołów
- Gmina: Wyry
- First mentioned: 1287

Population
  - Total: 6,400
- Time zone: UTC+1 (CET)
  - Summer (DST): UTC+2 (CEST)
- Postal code: 43-175
- Vehicle registration: SMI

Wyry ([ˈvɨrɨ]) (German: Wyrow) is a village in Mikołów County, Silesian Voivodeship, in southern Poland. It is the seat of the gmina (administrative district) called Gmina Wyry. It lies approximately 4 kilometres (2 mi) south of Mikołów and 15 km (9 mi) south-west of the regional capital Katowice.

== History ==
The village was first mentioned in a 1287 document of Mieszko I, Duke of Cieszyn, when it was part of Piast-ruled fragmented Poland. Its name comes from an Old Polish word wir, meaning "spring".

During the political upheaval caused by Matthias Corvinus the land around Pszczyna was overtaken by Casimir II, Duke of Cieszyn, who sold it in 1517 to the Hungarian magnates of the Thurzó family, forming the Pless state country. In the accompanying sales document issued on 21 February 1517 the village was mentioned as Wyry. The Kingdom of Bohemia in 1526 became part of the Habsburg monarchy. In the War of the Austrian Succession most of Silesia was conquered by the Kingdom of Prussia, including the village. In 1770 the first coal mine in Wyry was opened. Having been part of Germany since 1871, the village was reintegrated with Poland after the country regained independence in 1918 and the majority of the population voted for reintegration with Poland in the Upper Silesia plebiscite in 1921 (1038 votes for Poland, 123 for Germany).

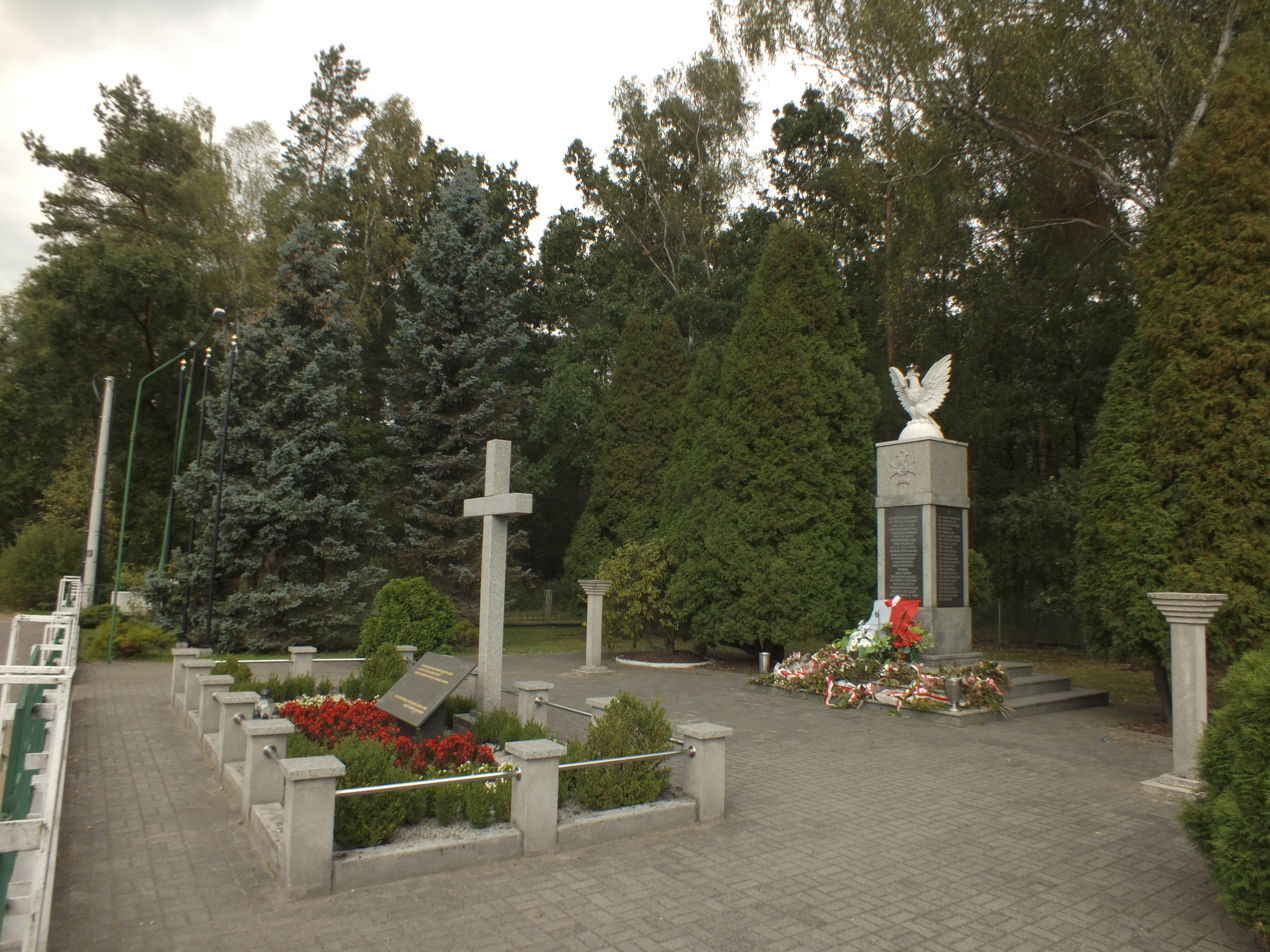
World War II memorial

In the early days of the invasion of Poland in September 1939, which marked the beginning of World War II, Wyry was the site of fierce Polish resistance against German invasion. Between 4 and 6 September 1939, the Germans murdered several Polish inhabitants of the village. There is a memorial to the murdered civilians, as well as graves of fallen Polish soldiers of the 1939 battle, in Wyry. Four Polish policemen from Wyry were murdered by the Russians in the Katyn massacre in 1940.

Coal was mined in Wyry until the 1960s.
