= Ornontowice =

- Village
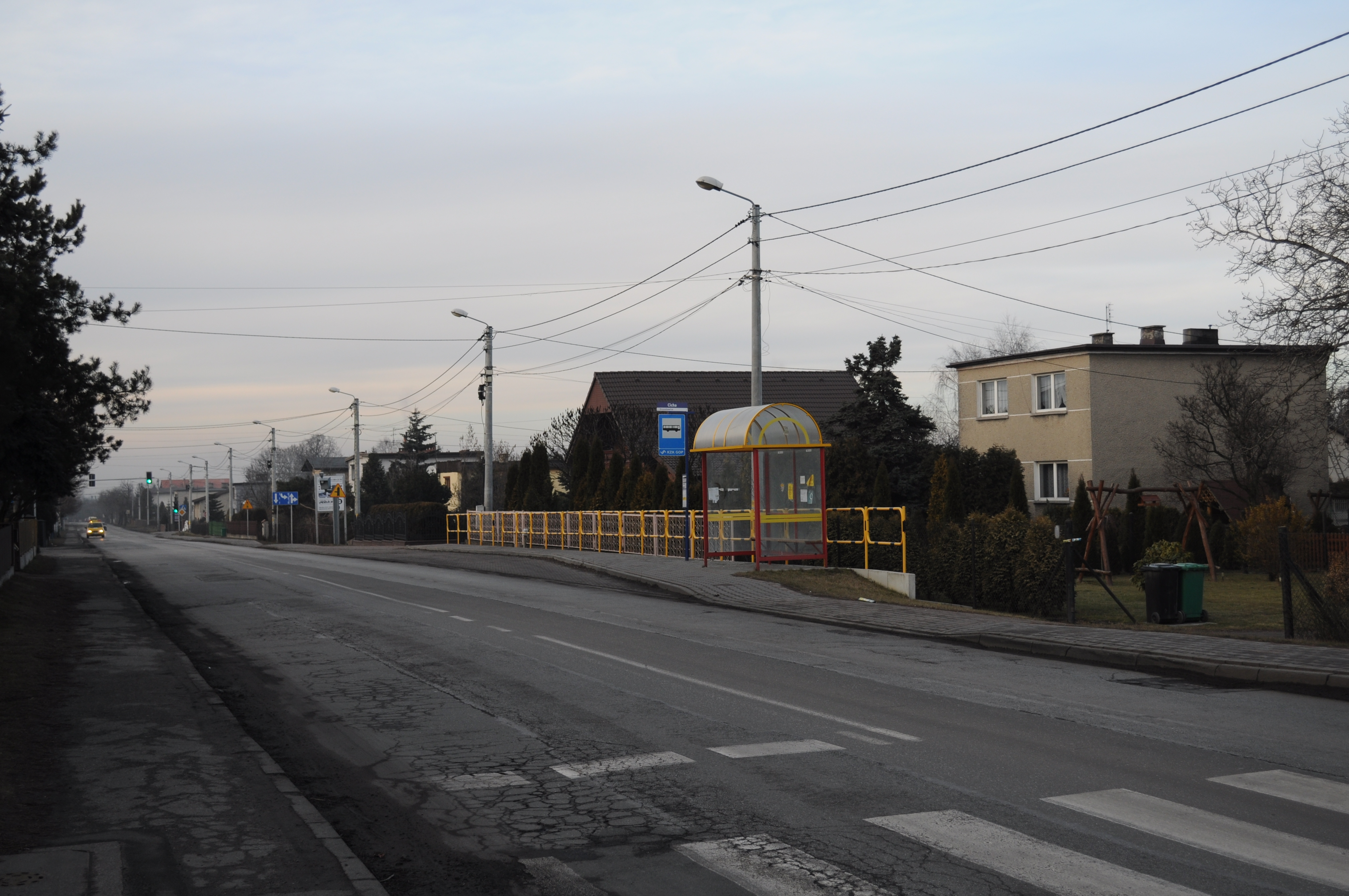

- Location within Poland
- Coordinates: 50°11′N 18°46′E
- Country: Poland
- Voivodeship: Silesian
- County: Mikołów
- Gmina: Ornontowice
- Population: 5,556
- Website: https://www.ornontowice.pl

Ornontowice ([ɔrnɔntɔˈvit͡sɛ]) (German: Ornontowitz) is a village in Mikołów County, Silesian Voivodeship, in southern Poland. It is the seat of the gmina (administrative district) called Gmina Ornontowice. It lies approximately 10 km (6 mi) west of Mikołów and 19 km (12 mi) south-west of the regional capital Katowice. The Budryk Coal Mine is located near to the village.
