= Kolonia Fryderyk =

- Village
- Coat of arms

- Location within Poland
- Coordinates: 49°58′8″N 18°25′12″E
- Country: Poland
- Voivodeship: Silesian
- County: Wodzisław
- Gmina: Gorzyce
- Established: 1911

Government
  - Mayor: Bolesław Lenczyk
- Area: 1.78 km^{2} (0.69 sq mi)
- Population (2006): 1,105
  - Density: 621/km^{2} (1,610/sq mi)
- Time zone: UTC+1 (CET)
  - Summer (DST): UTC+2 (CEST)
- Postal code: 44-350
- Car plates: SWD

Kolonia Fryderyk [kɔˈlɔɲa frɨˈdɛrɨk] is a village in Gmina Gorzyce, Wodzisław County, Silesian Voivodeship, Poland.

It was founded in 1911 as a coal mining settlement. Construction of the Friedrich - Schacht coal mine had begun in 1913 and it began operating for war purposes in 1916. It was closed in 1923.
