= Łaziska Górne =

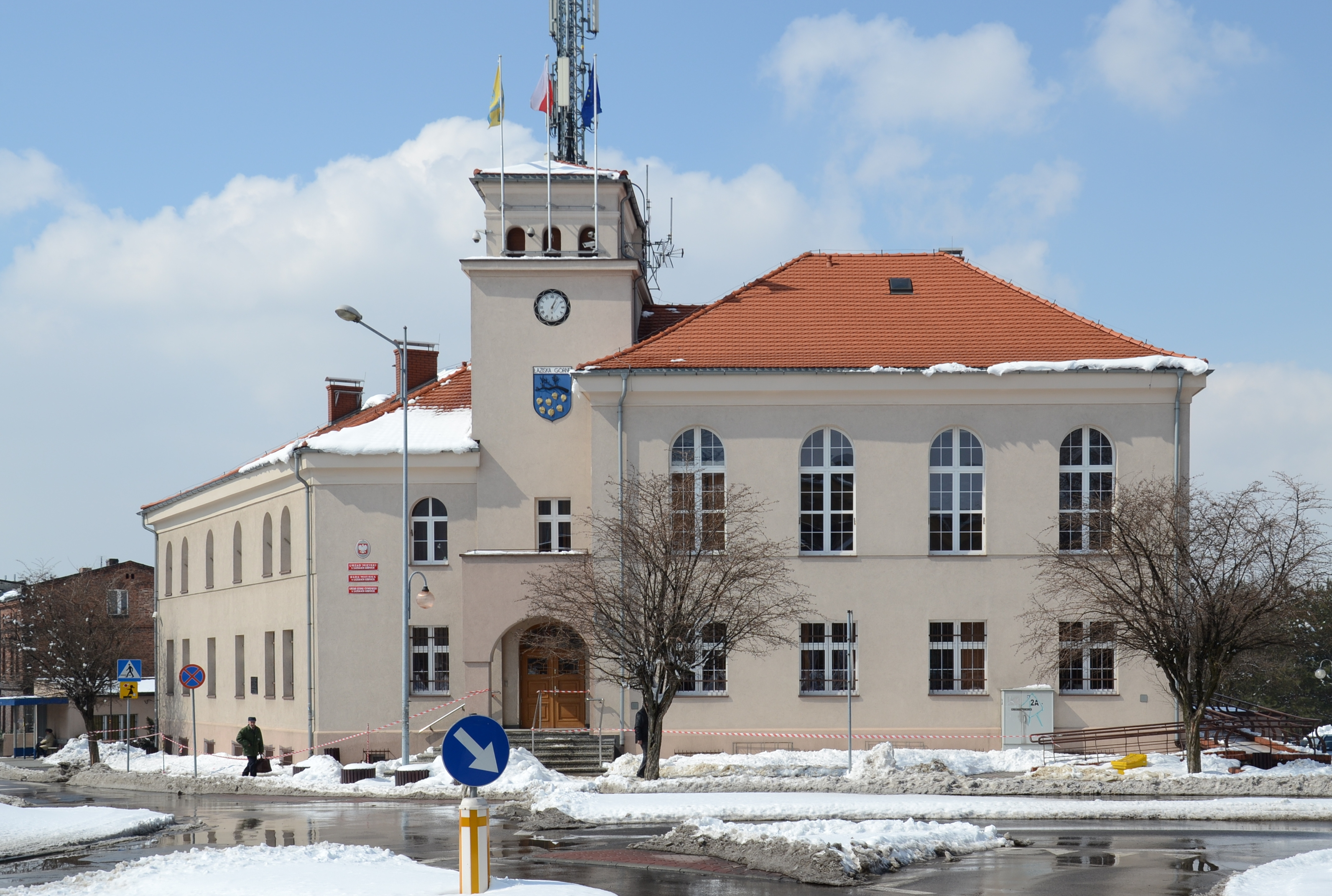
- Town hall

- Flag Coat of arms

- Location within Poland
- Coordinates: 50°9′N 18°51′E
- Country: Poland
- Voivodeship: Silesian
- County: Mikołów
- Gmina: Łaziska Górne (urban gmina)

Government
  - Mayor: Aleksander Wyra

Area
  - City: 20.7 km^{2} (8.0 sq mi)

Population (2019-06-30)
  - City: 22,298
  - Density: 1,080/km^{2} (2,790/sq mi)
  - Urban: 2,746,000
  - Metro: 5,294,000
- Time zone: UTC+1 (CET)
  - Summer (DST): UTC+2 (CEST)
- Postal code: 43-170 to 43-173
- Car plates: SMI
- Website: www.laziska.pl

Łaziska Górne [waˈʑiska ˈɡurnɛ] (German: Ober Lazisk, Silesian: Gōrne Łaziska) is a town in Silesia in southern Poland, near Katowice. Outer town of the Metropolis GZM – metropolis with a population of 2 million. Located in the Silesian Highlands.

It is situated in the Silesian Voivodeship since its formation in 1999, previously in Katowice Voivodeship, and before then, of the Autonomous Silesian Voivodeship. Łaziska is one of the towns of the 2,7 million conurbation - Katowice urban area and within a greater Katowice-Ostrava metropolitan area populated by about 5,294,000 people. The population of the town is 22,298 as of 2019.

== History ==
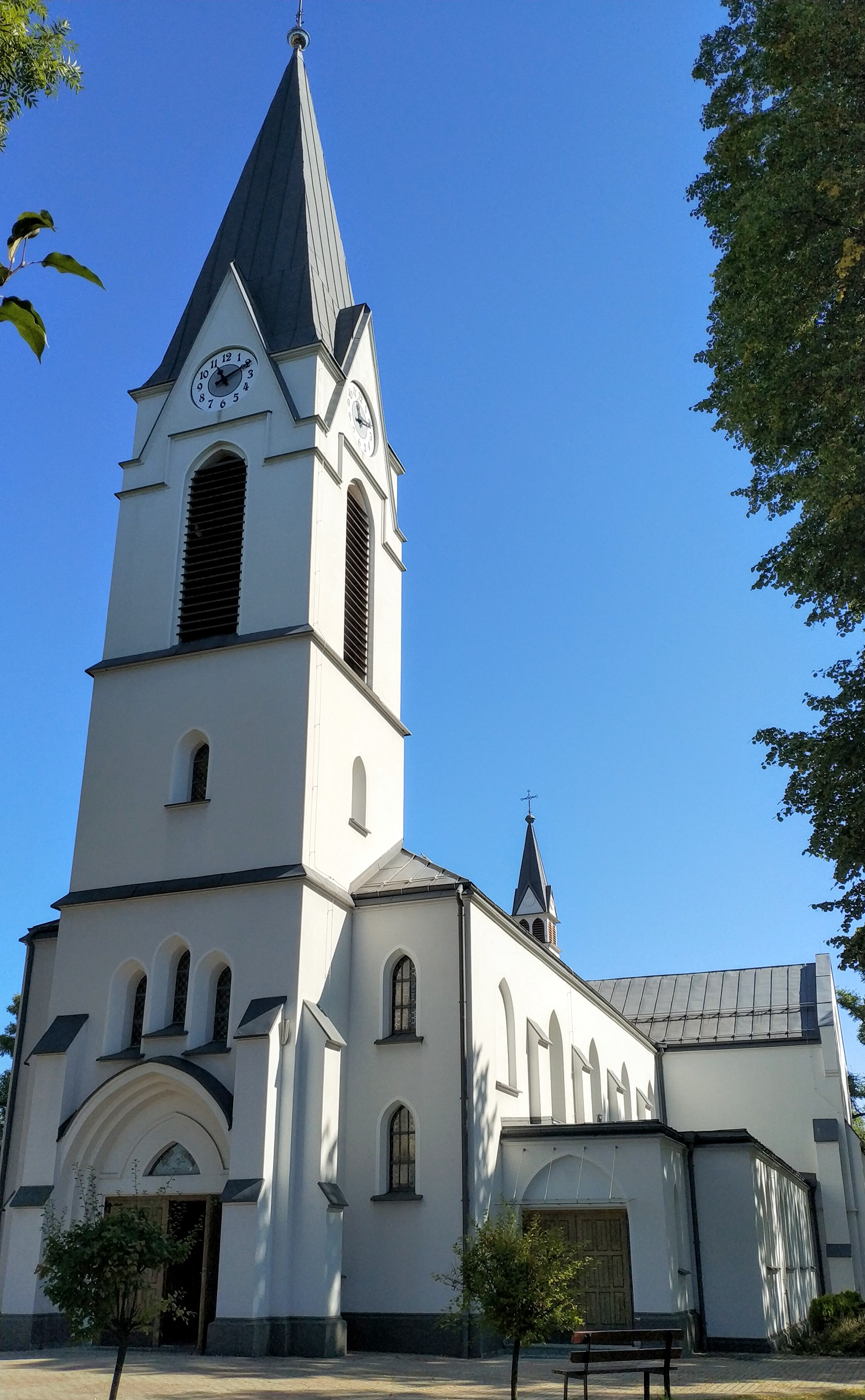
Our Lady Queen of the Rosary church

Łaziska is historically subdivided into three parts: Łaziska Dolne (Lower Łaziska), Łaziska Średnie (middle Łaziska) and Łaziska Górne (upper Łaziska). All of them are now part of the town, which was named only after the last one. The oldest settlement was located in what is now Łaziska Średnie. The village Łaziska was first mentioned in 1287 as villa Lasiszka, although the document could have been a falsificate. The second in seniority was Łaziska Dolne, and the youngest Łaziska Górne.

It was part of medieval Piast-ruled Poland, and then passed under Bohemian (Czech) suzerainty. During the political upheaval caused by Matthias Corvinus the land around Pszczyna was overtaken by Casimir II, Duke of Cieszyn, who sold it in 1517 to the Hungarian magnates of the Thurzó family, forming the Pless state country. In the accompanying sales document issued on 21 February 1517 the two villages were mentioned as Lazyska Dolny and Lazyska Horny. Łaziska Średnie was, in contrary to Łaziska Dolne and Łaziska Górne, a private village until 1814.

The Kingdom of Bohemia in 1526 became part of the Habsburg monarchy. In the War of the Austrian Succession most of Silesia was conquered by the Kingdom of Prussia, including the three sister settlements, and from 1871 all were part of Germany. In 1913, the Polish choir "Echo" was founded in Łaziska Górne, as one of the oldest in the region, and then it operated despite repressions from the German authorities, before the temporary suspension of activities during World War I. In 1918 the war ended and Poland regained independence, and after the subsequent Polish Silesian Uprisings, which were also fought in Łaziska, all three settlements were reintegrated with Poland.

Already on September 2–3, 1939, in the beginning of the German invasion of Poland and World War II, German troops committed massacres of Poles in Łaziska Górne, Łaziska Dolne and Łaziska Średnie, killing 26, 17 and 19 people, respectively (see Nazi crimes against the Polish nation). On September 6, 1939, the Freikorps murdered seven more Poles in Łaziska Górne. Among the victims of the massacres were former insurgents of the Silesian Uprisings, activists, miners, craftsmen, workers, a teacher, local official, farmer, and also teenagers and women. The town was then occupied by Germany until 1945. Seven Polish policemen who were either born or served in Łaziska were murdered by the Russians in Tver in April–May 1940 during the large Katyn massacre. The Germans established and operated a forced labour camp for Jews in Łaziska Górne, and the E393 forced labour subcamp of the Stalag VIII-B/344 prisoner-of-war camp in Łaziska Średnie.

In 1951, Łaziska Górne was granted town rights, and in 1973 Łaziska Dolne and Łaziska Średnie were included within its town limits as new districts.

== Industry ==
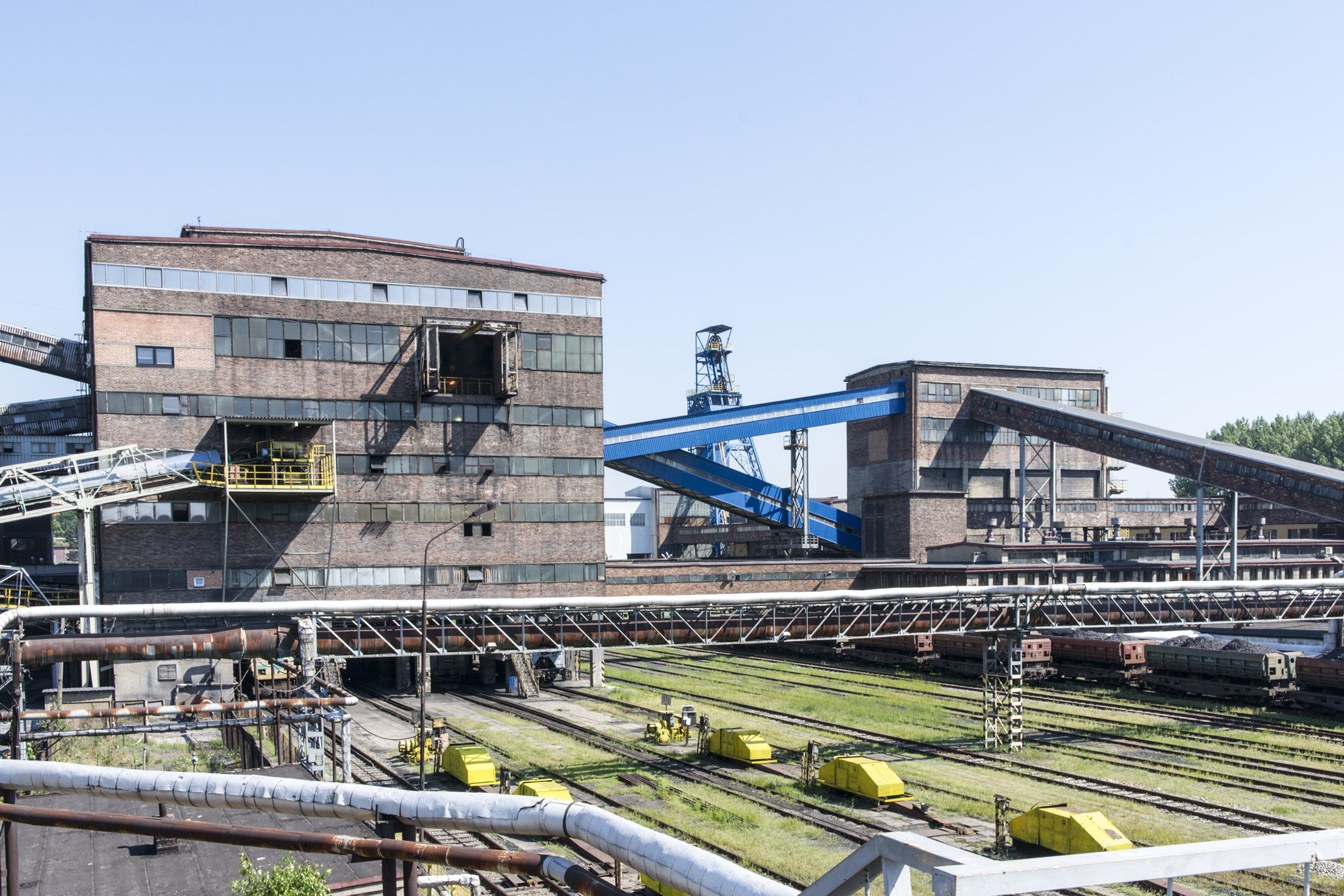
Bolesław Śmiały Coal Mine

- Łaziska Power Station
- Bolesław Śmiały Coal Mine
- Łaziska Steel Mill
- Wilk Elektronik S.A. (computer memory)

== Sports ==
Polonia Łaziska Górne sports club is based in the town, with football, volleyball and bowling sections.

== Twin towns – sister cities ==
Łaziska Górne is twinned with:

- Fulnek, Czech Republic
- Vrútky, Slovakia
