= Mikołów County =

Mikołów County Powiat mikołowski
- County
- Flag Coat of arms

- Location within the voivodeship

- Location in Poland
- Coordinates (Mikołów): 50°10′N 18°54′E
- Country: Poland
- Voivodeship: Silesian
- Seat: Mikołów
- Gminas: Total 5 (incl. 3 urban): Łaziska Górne; Mikołów; Orzesze; Gmina Ornontowice; Gmina Wyry

Area
  - Total: 231.53 km^{2} (89.39 sq mi)

Population (2019-06-30)
  - Total: 98,689
  - Density: 426.25/km^{2} (1,104.0/sq mi)
  - Urban: 84,239
  - Rural: 14,450
- Car plates: SMI
- Website: mikolowski.pl

Mikołów County (Polish: powiat mikołowski) is a unit of territorial administration and local government (powiat) in Silesian Voivodeship, southern Poland. It came into being on January 1, 1999, as a result of the Polish local government reforms passed in 1998. Its administrative seat and largest town is Mikołów, which lies 12 kilometres (7 mi) south-west of the regional capital Katowice. The county also contains the towns of Łaziska Górne, lying 5 km (3 mi) south-west of Mikołów, and Orzesze, 11 km (7 mi) west of Mikołów.

The county covers an area of 231.53 square kilometres (89.4 sq mi). As of 2019 its total population is 98,689, out of which the population of Mikołów is 40,898, that of Łaziska Górne is 22,298, that of Orzesze is 21,043, and the rural population is 14,450.

== Neighbouring counties ==
Mikołów County is bordered by the city of Ruda Śląska to the north, Katowice and Tychy to the east, Pszczyna County and Żory to the south, Rybnik County to the west and Gliwice County to the north-west.

== Administrative divisions ==
Map of Mikołów County

The county is subdivided into five gminas (three urban and two rural). These are listed in the following table, in descending order of population.

| Gmina | Type | Area (km^{2}) | Population (2019) | Seat |
|---|---|---|---|---|
| Mikołów | urban | 81.0 | 40,898 | |
| Łaziska Górne | urban | 20.2 | 22,298 | |
| Orzesze | urban | 82.9 | 21,043 | |
| Gmina Wyry | rural | 34.5 | 8,316 | Wyry |
| Gmina Ornontowice | rural | 15.1 | 6,134 | Ornontowice |
