= List of Polish gminas =

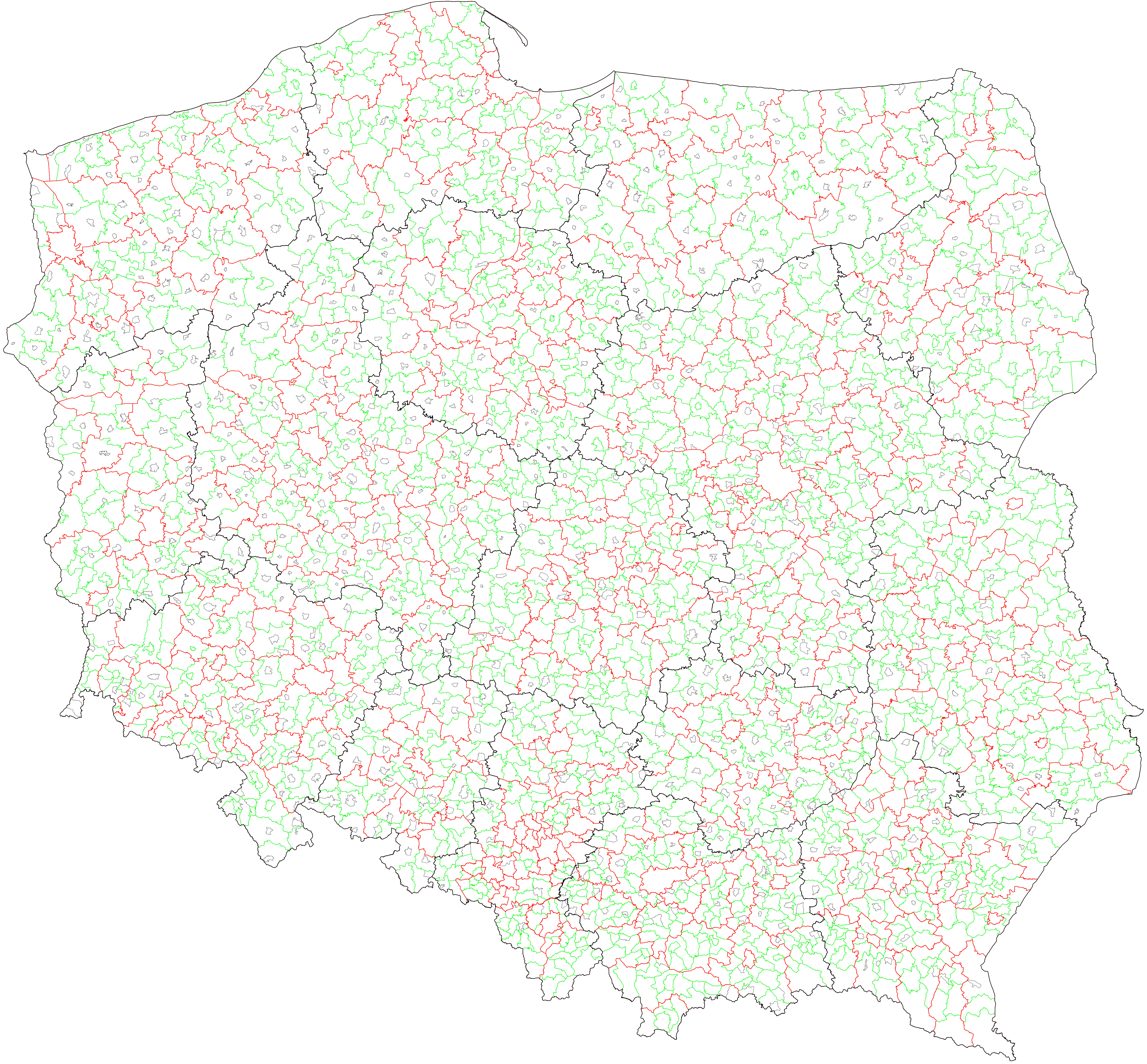
Poland's administrative divisions, as of 1 January 2020, with voivodeship, county, gmina and towns in urban-rural gminas shown.

Since 1999, Poland has had a three-tier administrative division system. On the first level, Poland is divided into 16 voivodeships (województwa, sing. województwo). These are subdivided in 380 counties (powiaty, sing. powiat), and these counties contain 2,479 municipalities, known as gminas.

The municipalities are grouped into four categories:

- 66 cities with county rights, which are among the largest cities in Poland, which, in addition to being a municipality are also a county on its own and also have duties of such.
- 302 urban municipalities, which usually contain a small-to-medium-sized city alone.
- 724 urban-rural gminas, which contain all the other towns not in any of the above categories as well as surrounding rural areas
- 1,453 rural gminas, which do not have any towns located on their territory.

The status and the changes in borders of gminas are decided by the Council of Ministers. While their creation and dissolution is also usually decided by it, in exceptional cases, the parliament might direct the organ to issue ordinances ordering dissolution (as it was the case with gmina Ostrowice). These ordinances take effect on 1 January of the year following the year of publication of the ordinance.

Major changes to the framework (such as a restructuring of local administration or regulation of the duties and powers of the self-government) is only possible by law.

The current framework and regulation of powers and duties of the local self-government was adopted in 1998 and became effective on 1 January 1999, with special regulations concerning Warsaw came into existence in 2002.

== History of municipalities ==
Poland has had a long history of having gminas as an administrative division. In Interwar Poland, gminas also were local self-governing entities. This system stayed after World War II until administrative reform in 1950.

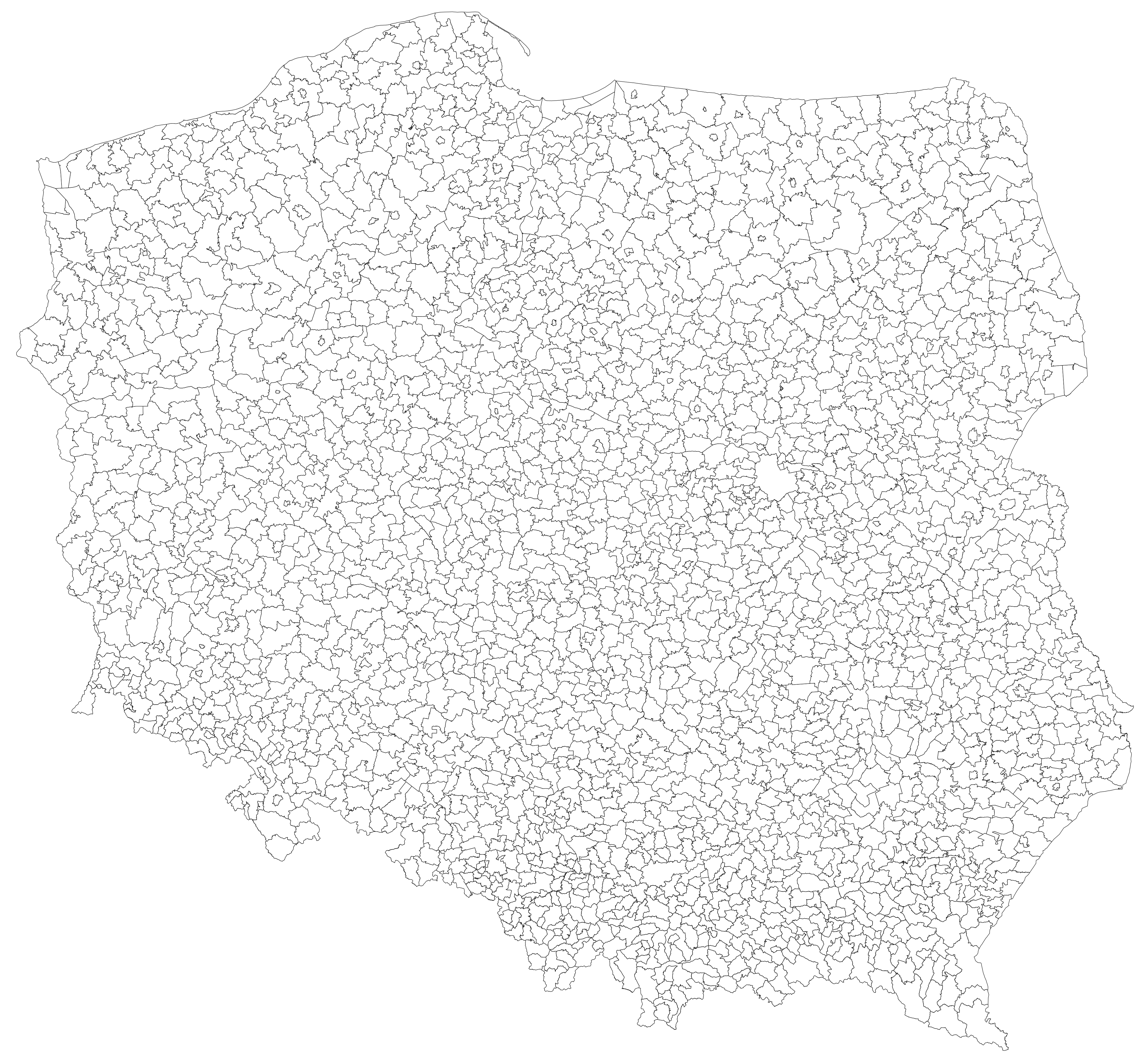
Borders of gminas of Poland, as of 1 January 2020

That year, a large overhaul of local administration was made. While the administrative divisions remained three-tier, gminas were substituted with almost 8,800 gromady, osiedla, and towns. The largest change, however, was that the local administrative units were stripped of their self-government and instead simply executed the will of higher administrative organs and, in practice, also of local party organs.

Over time, over half of the gromadas were merged into larger entities, until the larger gminas were reinstated in 1973, decreasing the number of municipalities to 3,201. Further reductions brought the number down to below 2,900 by 1977. Meanwhile, Poland abolished counties completely and introduced a new, two-tier administrative division system, with 49 smaller voivodeships and gminas. Ostensibly, the reforms of 1973 and 1975 were made in order to guide Poland through an accelerated period of growth; however, the real intent seemed to be an attempt to address what the government in Warsaw and party organs saw as excessive decentralisation. As a result, Poland's local units lost all degrees of self-government.

This was an immediate concern with the fall of communism, and in 1990, gminas were regranted some rights of self-government and autonomy. Quickly, though, over 500 towns that previously had been separate municipalities were merged into urban-rural gminas. The last major change happened with the return to the three-tier administrative division in 1999, when some county mergers were reversed and some of the largest cities became city with powiat rights. Since then, the vast majority of changes have been made with the Council of Ministry granting city-rights to smaller settlements that had previously lost theirs, even for settlements as small as 330 inhabitants.

As of 1 January 2021, the number of gminas according to its type is the following:

voivodeship	Lower Silesian	Kuyavian-Pomeranian	Lublin	Lubusz	Łódź	Lesser Poland	Mazo-vian	Opole	Subcar-pathian	Podla-chian	Pome-ranian	Sile-sian	Święto-krzyskie	Warmian- Mazurian	Greater Poland	West Pomeranian	Poland
urban	35	17	20	9	18	14	35	3	16	13	22	49	5	16	19	11	302
of which with county rights	4	4	4	2	3	3	5	1	4	3	4	19	1	2	4	3	66
urban-rural	57	35	30	34	28	48	57	33	36	27	20	22	40	34	96	55	652
rural	77	92	163	39	131	120	222	35	108	78	81	96	57	66	111	47	1523
TOTAL	169	144	213	82	177	182	314	71	160	118	123	167	102	117	226	113	2477

== List ==
The list contains 2,477 municipalities sorted by increasing TERYT (National Register of Territorial Land Apportionment Journal) code, which is not given in the table. It is roughly sorted alphabetically by voivodeships, powiats and then gminas (with urban gminas first) as they appear in Polish.

- The data for the local administrative units' names and their status (urban, rural-urban, rural) is given as of 1 January 2021. The cities on county rights, for emphasis, have been given in **bold**.
- Population count is given as of 30 June 2025, with population density given as of 30 June 2020.
- Area, in km^{2}, is given as of 1 January 2020
- Average population increase is given in per milles (‰) and has been averaged per annum for 2023-2025.

Gmina	Type	Powiat	Voivodeship	Area	Population	Density	Population increase, ‰
Bolesławiec	urban	Bolesławiec	Lower Silesian	23.57	36,663	1642.64	-6.7
gmina Bolesławiec	rural	Bolesławiec	Lower Silesian	288.49	14,778	51.23	-4.2
gmina Gromadka	rural	Bolesławiec	Lower Silesian	267.68	5,337	19.94	-13.3
gmina Nowogrodziec	urban-rural	Bolesławiec	Lower Silesian	176.29	15,202	86.23	-3.7
gmina Osiecznica	rural	Bolesławiec	Lower Silesian	437.04	7,364	16.85	0.0
gmina Warta Bolesławiecka	rural	Bolesławiec	Lower Silesian	110.44	8,634	78.18	-0.92
Bielawa	urban	Dzierżoniów	Lower Silesian	36.21	29,713	820.57	-6.23
Dzierżoniów	urban	Dzierżoniów	Lower Silesian	20.07	33,075	1647.98	-6.29
gmina Pieszyce	urban-rural	Dzierżoniów	Lower Silesian	63.61	9,397	147.73	-7.34
Piława Górna	urban	Dzierżoniów	Lower Silesian	20.93	6,382	304.92	-7.82
gmina Dzierżoniów	rural	Dzierżoniów	Lower Silesian	141.06	9,072	64.31	-3.68
gmina Łagiewniki	rural	Dzierżoniów	Lower Silesian	124.77	7,430	59.55	-3.3
gmina Niemcza	urban-rural	Dzierżoniów	Lower Silesian	71.86	5,450	75.84	-7.53
Głogów	urban	Głogów	Lower Silesian	35.11	66,627	1897.66	-7.33
gmina Głogów	rural	Głogów	Lower Silesian	84.79	6,793	80.12	8.38
gmina Jerzmanowa	rural	Głogów	Lower Silesian	63.32	5,269	83.21	24.64
gmina Kotla	rural	Głogów	Lower Silesian	127.52	4,458	34.96	3.24
gmina Pęcław	rural	Głogów	Lower Silesian	64.27	2,241	34.87	-7.47
gmina Żukowice	rural	Głogów	Lower Silesian	68.26	3,464	50.75	-2.01
gmina Góra	urban-rural	Góra	Lower Silesian	266.11	19,795	74.39	-6.86
gmina Jemielno	rural	Góra	Lower Silesian	124.02	2,971	23.96	-10.65
gmina Niechlów	rural	Góra	Lower Silesian	151.03	4,829	31.97	-11.93
gmina Wąsosz	urban-rural	Góra	Lower Silesian	197.11	7,103	36.04	-8.35
Jawor	urban	Jawor	Lower Silesian	18.8	22,615	1202.93	-10.69
gmina Bolków	urban-rural	Jawor	Lower Silesian	152.6	10,363	67.91	-7.76
gmina Męcinka	rural	Jawor	Lower Silesian	147.78	5,006	33.87	1.74
gmina Mściwojów	rural	Jawor	Lower Silesian	71.94	4,041	56.17	-7.88
gmina Paszowice	rural	Jawor	Lower Silesian	101.28	3,998	39.47	0.08
gmina Wądroże Wielkie	rural	Jawor	Lower Silesian	89.15	3,914	43.9	-4.14
Karpacz	urban	Karkonosze	Lower Silesian	37.99	4,541	119.53	-13.78
Kowary	urban	Karkonosze	Lower Silesian	37.39	10,741	287.27	-11.79
Piechowice	urban	Karkonosze	Lower Silesian	43.22	6,121	141.62	-11.29
Szklarska Poręba	urban	Karkonosze	Lower Silesian	75.44	6,587	87.31	-1.92
gmina Janowice Wielkie	rural	Karkonosze	Lower Silesian	57.83	4,275	73.92	-3.33
gmina Jeżów Sudecki	rural	Karkonosze	Lower Silesian	94.28	7,477	79.31	9.4
gmina Mysłakowice	rural	Karkonosze	Lower Silesian	87.98	10,142	115.28	-4.79
gmina Podgórzyn	rural	Karkonosze	Lower Silesian	82.51	8,262	100.13	-2.05
gmina Stara Kamienica	rural	Karkonosze	Lower Silesian	110.5	5,242	47.44	-1.65
Kamienna Góra	urban	Kamienna Góra	Lower Silesian	18.04	18,728	1038.14	-12.65
gmina Kamienna Góra	rural	Kamienna Góra	Lower Silesian	158.03	9,018	57.07	-0.41
gmina Lubawka	urban-rural	Kamienna Góra	Lower Silesian	138.05	10,802	78.25	-8.52
gmina Marciszów	rural	Kamienna Góra	Lower Silesian	81.57	4,507	55.25	-5.27
Duszniki-Zdrój	urban	Kłodzko	Lower Silesian	22.28	4,476	200.9	-17.68
Kłodzko	urban	Kłodzko	Lower Silesian	24.84	26,574	1069.81	-8.62
Kudowa-Zdrój	urban	Kłodzko	Lower Silesian	33.9	9,852	290.62	-7.24
Nowa Ruda	urban	Kłodzko	Lower Silesian	37.05	21,752	587.1	-11.27
Polanica-Zdrój	urban	Kłodzko	Lower Silesian	17.22	6,275	364.4	-9.74
gmina Bystrzyca Kłodzka	urban-rural	Kłodzko	Lower Silesian	338.53	18,729	55.32	-7.59
gmina Kłodzko	rural	Kłodzko	Lower Silesian	253.25	17,079	67.44	-2.31
gmina Lądek-Zdrój	urban-rural	Kłodzko	Lower Silesian	117.27	8,171	69.68	-8.62
gmina Lewin Kłodzki	rural	Kłodzko	Lower Silesian	52.14	1,930	37.02	-0.17
gmina Międzylesie	urban-rural	Kłodzko	Lower Silesian	188.75	7,155	37.91	-5.85
gmina Nowa Ruda	rural	Kłodzko	Lower Silesian	139.67	11,478	82.18	-8.28
gmina Radków	urban-rural	Kłodzko	Lower Silesian	139.95	9,018	64.44	-4.32
gmina Stronie Śląskie	urban-rural	Kłodzko	Lower Silesian	146.08	7,446	50.97	-5.62
gmina Szczytna	urban-rural	Kłodzko	Lower Silesian	132.37	7,256	54.82	-5
Chojnów	urban	Legnica	Lower Silesian	5.32	13,288	2497.74	-8.46
gmina Chojnów	rural	Legnica	Lower Silesian	230.92	9,555	41.38	-0.91
gmina Krotoszyce	rural	Legnica	Lower Silesian	67.5	3,322	49.21	3.64
gmina Kunice	rural	Legnica	Lower Silesian	92.66	7,098	76.6	18.41
gmina Legnickie Pole	rural	Legnica	Lower Silesian	85.24	5,191	60.9	-3.57
gmina Miłkowice	rural	Legnica	Lower Silesian	86.63	6,802	78.52	10.25
gmina Prochowice	urban-rural	Legnica	Lower Silesian	102.51	7,376	71.95	-5.28
gmina Ruja	rural	Legnica	Lower Silesian	73.3	2,578	35.17	-7.51
Lubań	urban	Lubań	Lower Silesian	16.12	20,879	1295.22	-7.33
Świeradów-Zdrój	urban	Lubań	Lower Silesian	20.72	4,054	195.66	-13.83
gmina Leśna	urban-rural	Lubań	Lower Silesian	104.6	9,937	95	-10.03
gmina Lubań	rural	Lubań	Lower Silesian	142.34	6,592	46.31	-0.45
gmina Olszyna	urban-rural	Lubań	Lower Silesian	47.12	6,496	137.86	-2.1
gmina Platerówka	rural	Lubań	Lower Silesian	47.9	1,621	33.84	1.65
gmina Siekierczyn	rural	Lubań	Lower Silesian	49.5	4,491	90.73	-2.88
Lubin	urban	Lubin	Lower Silesian	40.77	72,142	1769.49	-3.71
gmina Lubin	rural	Lubin	Lower Silesian	289.78	16,328	56.35	18.92
gmina Rudna	rural	Lubin	Lower Silesian	216.64	7,794	35.98	2.62
gmina Ścinawa	urban-rural	Lubin	Lower Silesian	164.43	9,842	59.86	-8.46
gmina Gryfów Śląski	urban-rural	Lwówek	Lower Silesian	66.67	9,623	144.34	-5.48
gmina Lubomierz	urban-rural	Lwówek	Lower Silesian	130.53	6,195	47.46	1.46
gmina Lwówek Śląski	urban-rural	Lwówek	Lower Silesian	239.93	17,219	71.77	-3.52
gmina Mirsk	urban-rural	Lwówek	Lower Silesian	186.5	8,496	45.55	-6.35
gmina Wleń	urban-rural	Lwówek	Lower Silesian	86.06	4,237	49.23	-7.13
gmina Cieszków	rural	Milicz	Lower Silesian	100.83	4,660	46.22	0.93
gmina Krośnice	rural	Milicz	Lower Silesian	178.54	8,106	45.4	-2.58
gmina Milicz	urban-rural	Milicz	Lower Silesian	435.56	24,147	55.44	-2.08
Oleśnica	urban	Oleśnica	Lower Silesian	20.96	37,109	1770.47	-2.13
gmina Bierutów	urban-rural	Oleśnica	Lower Silesian	147	9,918	67.47	-5.58
gmina Dobroszyce	rural	Oleśnica	Lower Silesian	131.96	6,863	52.01	15.58
gmina Dziadowa Kłoda	rural	Oleśnica	Lower Silesian	105.79	4,586	43.35	-5.89
gmina Międzybórz	urban-rural	Oleśnica	Lower Silesian	87.78	5,102	58.12	-1.24
gmina Oleśnica	rural	Oleśnica	Lower Silesian	242.85	13,965	57.5	19.63
gmina Syców	urban-rural	Oleśnica	Lower Silesian	145.11	16,888	116.38	1.33
gmina Twardogóra	urban-rural	Oleśnica	Lower Silesian	167.86	12,897	76.83	-4.23
Oława	urban	Oława	Lower Silesian	27.36	33,172	1212.43	3.64
gmina Domaniów	rural	Oława	Lower Silesian	94.46	5,154	54.56	-6.01
gmina Jelcz-Laskowice	urban-rural	Oława	Lower Silesian	167.63	23,298	138.98	1.52
gmina Oława	rural	Oława	Lower Silesian	234.65	15,207	64.81	1.25
gmina Chocianów	urban-rural	Polkowice	Lower Silesian	221.66	12,793	57.71	-3.47
gmina Gaworzyce	rural	Polkowice	Lower Silesian	76.76	3,982	51.88	-2.58
gmina Grębocice	rural	Polkowice	Lower Silesian	121.7	5,430	44.62	2.28
gmina Polkowice	urban-rural	Polkowice	Lower Silesian	167.65	27,715	165.31	3
gmina Przemków	urban-rural	Polkowice	Lower Silesian	107.45	8,308	77.32	-8.33
gmina Radwanice	rural	Polkowice	Lower Silesian	84.24	4,854	57.62	7.39
gmina Borów	rural	Strzelin	Lower Silesian	98.65	5,257	53.29	-2.77
gmina Kondratowice	rural	Strzelin	Lower Silesian	98.26	4,259	43.34	-8.62
gmina Przeworno	rural	Strzelin	Lower Silesian	111.97	4,734	42.28	-8.51
gmina Strzelin	urban-rural	Strzelin	Lower Silesian	171.41	22,121	129.05	-0.65
gmina Wiązów	urban-rural	Strzelin	Lower Silesian	141.77	7,085	49.98	-9.87
gmina Kostomłoty	rural	Środa	Lower Silesian	145.24	7,110	48.95	-2.19
gmina Malczyce	rural	Środa	Lower Silesian	52.57	5,938	112.95	-4.62
gmina Miękinia	rural	Środa	Lower Silesian	179.48	17,333	96.57	43.94
gmina Środa Śląska	urban-rural	Środa	Lower Silesian	215.96	19,908	92.18	2.61
gmina Udanin	rural	Środa	Lower Silesian	110.89	5,067	45.69	-11.69
Świdnica	urban	Świdnica	Lower Silesian	21.76	56,564	2599.45	-6.96
Świebodzice	urban	Świdnica	Lower Silesian	30.43	22,715	746.47	-2.51
gmina Dobromierz	rural	Świdnica	Lower Silesian	85.93	5,197	60.48	-6.77
gmina Jaworzyna Śląska	urban-rural	Świdnica	Lower Silesian	67.45	10,235	151.74	-3.07
gmina Marcinowice	rural	Świdnica	Lower Silesian	95.24	6,533	68.6	1.79
gmina Strzegom	urban-rural	Świdnica	Lower Silesian	144.65	25,608	177.03	-6.63
gmina Świdnica	rural	Świdnica	Lower Silesian	207.84	17,356	83.51	3.68
gmina Żarów	urban-rural	Świdnica	Lower Silesian	87.84	12,342	140.51	-5.82
gmina Oborniki Śląskie	urban-rural	Trzebnica	Lower Silesian	154.26	20,346	131.89	4.38
gmina Prusice	urban-rural	Trzebnica	Lower Silesian	157.98	9,380	59.37	1.1
gmina Trzebnica	urban-rural	Trzebnica	Lower Silesian	199.96	24,483	122.44	5.2
gmina Wisznia Mała	rural	Trzebnica	Lower Silesian	103.36	10,638	102.92	16.98
gmina Zawonia	rural	Trzebnica	Lower Silesian	117.45	5,919	50.4	0.73
gmina Żmigród	urban-rural	Trzebnica	Lower Silesian	291.77	14,635	50.16	-1.09
Boguszów-Gorce	urban	Wałbrzych	Lower Silesian	27.02	15,228	563.58	-8.86
Jedlina-Zdrój	urban	Wałbrzych	Lower Silesian	17.45	4,816	275.99	-7.5
Szczawno-Zdrój	urban	Wałbrzych	Lower Silesian	14.74	5,559	377.14	-7.56
gmina Czarny Bór	rural	Wałbrzych	Lower Silesian	66.4	4,850	73.04	-0.41
gmina Głuszyca	urban-rural	Wałbrzych	Lower Silesian	62.12	8,570	137.96	-6.53
gmina Mieroszów	urban-rural	Wałbrzych	Lower Silesian	76.06	6,717	88.31	-10.16
gmina Stare Bogaczowice	rural	Wałbrzych	Lower Silesian	87.29	4,287	49.11	2.81
gmina Walim	rural	Wałbrzych	Lower Silesian	79.14	5,387	68.07	-11.13
gmina Brzeg Dolny	urban-rural	Wołów	Lower Silesian	94.4	16,095	170.5	1.16
gmina Wińsko	rural	Wołów	Lower Silesian	249.46	8,241	33.04	-5.05
gmina Wołów	urban-rural	Wołów	Lower Silesian	331.1	22,389	67.62	-3.27
gmina Czernica	rural	Wrocław	Lower Silesian	83.63	17,102	204.5	57.09
gmina Długołęka	rural	Wrocław	Lower Silesian	212.84	34,471	161.96	46.2
gmina Jordanów Śląski	rural	Wrocław	Lower Silesian	56.69	3,181	56.11	3.16
gmina Kąty Wrocławskie	urban-rural	Wrocław	Lower Silesian	176.66	25,614	144.99	27.41
gmina Kobierzyce	rural	Wrocław	Lower Silesian	149.26	22,024	147.55	30.44
gmina Mietków	rural	Wrocław	Lower Silesian	83.38	3,761	45.11	-9.05
gmina Sobótka	urban-rural	Wrocław	Lower Silesian	136.26	12,889	94.59	1.5
gmina Siechnice	urban-rural	Wrocław	Lower Silesian	98.71	23,550	238.58	43.23
gmina Żórawina	rural	Wrocław	Lower Silesian	120.27	11,284	93.82	28.29
gmina Bardo	urban-rural	Ząbkowice	Lower Silesian	73.03	5,236	71.7	-7.03
gmina Ciepłowody	rural	Ząbkowice	Lower Silesian	77.41	2,971	38.38	-11.3
gmina Kamieniec Ząbkowicki	urban-rural	Ząbkowice	Lower Silesian	96.69	8,055	83.31	-9.1
gmina Stoszowice	rural	Ząbkowice	Lower Silesian	110.72	5,365	48.46	-5.47
gmina Ząbkowice Śląskie	urban-rural	Ząbkowice	Lower Silesian	146.13	21,584	147.7	-8.47
gmina Ziębice	urban-rural	Ząbkowice	Lower Silesian	222.28	16,853	75.82	-9.36
gmina Złoty Stok	urban-rural	Ząbkowice	Lower Silesian	75.27	4,422	58.75	-13.14
Zawidów	urban	Zgorzelec	Lower Silesian	6.07	4,154	684.35	-6.26
Zgorzelec	urban	Zgorzelec	Lower Silesian	15.88	30,047	1892.13	-9.5
gmina Bogatynia	urban-rural	Zgorzelec	Lower Silesian	136.12	22,800	167.5	-11.25
gmina Pieńsk	urban-rural	Zgorzelec	Lower Silesian	110.53	9,015	81.56	-6.35
gmina Sulików	rural	Zgorzelec	Lower Silesian	94.51	6,000	63.49	-5.22
gmina Węgliniec	urban-rural	Zgorzelec	Lower Silesian	338.34	8,233	24.33	-7.54
gmina Zgorzelec	rural	Zgorzelec	Lower Silesian	137.15	8,521	62.13	3.35
Wojcieszów	urban	Złotoryja	Lower Silesian	32.17	3,626	112.71	-8.76
Złotoryja	urban	Złotoryja	Lower Silesian	11.51	15,395	1337.53	-9.54
gmina Pielgrzymka	rural	Złotoryja	Lower Silesian	104.85	4,538	43.28	-5.95
gmina Świerzawa	urban-rural	Złotoryja	Lower Silesian	159.99	7,487	46.8	-6.29
gmina Zagrodno	rural	Złotoryja	Lower Silesian	122.34	5,233	42.77	-8.95
gmina Złotoryja	rural	Złotoryja	Lower Silesian	144.95	6,995	48.26	-3.6
**Jelenia Góra**	urban	city with county rights	Lower Silesian	109.22	78,778	721.28	-6.46
**Legnica**	urban	city with county rights	Lower Silesian	56.29	99,072	1760.03	-4.61
**Wrocław**	urban	city with county rights	Lower Silesian	292.82	643,782	2198.56	2.82
**Wałbrzych**	urban	city with county rights	Lower Silesian	84.7	110,603	1305.82	-10.22
Aleksandrów Kujawski	urban	Aleksandrów	Kuyavian-Pomeranian	7.23	12,077	1670.4	-6.35
Ciechocinek	urban	Aleksandrów	Kuyavian-Pomeranian	15.26	10,610	695.28	3.89
Nieszawa	urban	Aleksandrów	Kuyavian-Pomeranian	9.79	1,834	187.33	-17.88
gmina Aleksandrów Kujawski	rural	Aleksandrów	Kuyavian-Pomeranian	131.45	11,977	91.11	7.08
gmina Bądkowo	rural	Aleksandrów	Kuyavian-Pomeranian	79.7	4,189	52.56	-10.52
gmina Koneck	rural	Aleksandrów	Kuyavian-Pomeranian	67.84	3,126	46.08	-7.35
gmina Raciążek	rural	Aleksandrów	Kuyavian-Pomeranian	32.88	3,134	95.32	-1.17
gmina Waganiec	rural	Aleksandrów	Kuyavian-Pomeranian	54.52	4,560	83.64	-2.62
gmina Zakrzewo	rural	Aleksandrów	Kuyavian-Pomeranian	75.96	3,500	46.08	-3.12
Brodnica	urban	Brodnica	Kuyavian-Pomeranian	23.15	28,917	1249.11	2.25
gmina Bobrowo	rural	Brodnica	Kuyavian-Pomeranian	145.91	6,336	43.42	-2.25
gmina Brodnica	rural	Brodnica	Kuyavian-Pomeranian	126.87	8,586	67.68	19.99
gmina Brzozie	rural	Brodnica	Kuyavian-Pomeranian	93.66	3,813	40.71	0.96
gmina Górzno	urban-rural	Brodnica	Kuyavian-Pomeranian	119.68	3,904	32.62	-6.66
gmina Bartniczka	rural	Brodnica	Kuyavian-Pomeranian	83.4	4,698	56.33	-3.45
gmina Jabłonowo Pomorskie	urban-rural	Brodnica	Kuyavian-Pomeranian	134.86	8,855	65.66	-5.44
gmina Osiek	rural	Brodnica	Kuyavian-Pomeranian	75	4,039	53.85	-1.32
gmina Świedziebnia	rural	Brodnica	Kuyavian-Pomeranian	103.67	5,139	49.57	-2.39
gmina Zbiczno	rural	Brodnica	Kuyavian-Pomeranian	133.77	4,842	36.2	2.84
gmina Białe Błota	rural	Bydgoszcz	Kuyavian-Pomeranian	122.42	22,835	186.53	27.94
gmina Dąbrowa Chełmińska	rural	Bydgoszcz	Kuyavian-Pomeranian	125.04	8,389	67.09	5.54
gmina Dobrcz	rural	Bydgoszcz	Kuyavian-Pomeranian	130.07	11,878	91.32	12.37
gmina Koronowo	urban-rural	Bydgoszcz	Kuyavian-Pomeranian	411.53	24,055	58.45	-2.33
gmina Nowa Wieś Wielka	rural	Bydgoszcz	Kuyavian-Pomeranian	148.28	10,238	69.05	9.35
gmina Osielsko	rural	Bydgoszcz	Kuyavian-Pomeranian	101.72	14,992	147.38	36.23
gmina Sicienko	rural	Bydgoszcz	Kuyavian-Pomeranian	179.99	10,266	57.04	9.13
gmina Solec Kujawski	urban-rural	Bydgoszcz	Kuyavian-Pomeranian	175.07	16,795	95.93	-0.5
Chełmno	urban	Chełmno	Kuyavian-Pomeranian	13.56	19,388	1429.79	-9.08
gmina Chełmno	rural	Chełmno	Kuyavian-Pomeranian	113.71	6,127	53.88	10.22
gmina Kijewo Królewskie	rural	Chełmno	Kuyavian-Pomeranian	71.84	4,528	63.03	2.89
gmina Lisewo	rural	Chełmno	Kuyavian-Pomeranian	86.31	5,186	60.09	-6.35
gmina Papowo Biskupie	rural	Chełmno	Kuyavian-Pomeranian	70.45	4,336	61.55	-2.68
gmina Stolno	rural	Chełmno	Kuyavian-Pomeranian	98.52	5,292	53.71	4.13
gmina Unisław	rural	Chełmno	Kuyavian-Pomeranian	72.55	6,960	95.93	-0.62
Golub-Dobrzyń	urban	Golub-Dobrzyń	Kuyavian-Pomeranian	7.5	12,508	1667.73	-8.41
gmina Ciechocin	rural	Golub-Dobrzyń	Kuyavian-Pomeranian	101.23	4,010	39.61	-1.41
gmina Golub-Dobrzyń	rural	Golub-Dobrzyń	Kuyavian-Pomeranian	197.79	8,799	44.49	5.71
gmina Kowalewo Pomorskie	urban-rural	Golub-Dobrzyń	Kuyavian-Pomeranian	141.2	11,438	81.01	-2.52
gmina Radomin	rural	Golub-Dobrzyń	Kuyavian-Pomeranian	80.81	3,824	47.32	-2.77
gmina Zbójno	rural	Golub-Dobrzyń	Kuyavian-Pomeranian	84.32	4,373	51.86	-0.46
gmina Grudziądz	rural	Grudziądz	Kuyavian-Pomeranian	165.33	13,008	78.68	12.4
gmina Gruta	rural	Grudziądz	Kuyavian-Pomeranian	123.75	6,415	51.84	-6.61
gmina Łasin	urban-rural	Grudziądz	Kuyavian-Pomeranian	136.55	7,807	57.17	-9.88
gmina Radzyń Chełmiński	urban-rural	Grudziądz	Kuyavian-Pomeranian	91.14	4,633	50.83	-6.53
gmina Rogóźno	rural	Grudziądz	Kuyavian-Pomeranian	116.24	4,210	36.22	0.87
gmina Świecie nad Osą	rural	Grudziądz	Kuyavian-Pomeranian	94.75	4,129	43.58	-12.06
Inowrocław	urban	Inowrocław	Kuyavian-Pomeranian	30.42	72,226	2374.29	-7.22
gmina Dąbrowa Biskupia	rural	Inowrocław	Kuyavian-Pomeranian	147.28	5,076	34.46	-3.91
gmina Gniewkowo	urban-rural	Inowrocław	Kuyavian-Pomeranian	179.72	14,386	80.05	-4.32
gmina Inowrocław	rural	Inowrocław	Kuyavian-Pomeranian	171.65	11,817	68.84	4.38
gmina Janikowo	urban-rural	Inowrocław	Kuyavian-Pomeranian	91.95	13,045	141.87	-6.01
gmina Kruszwica	urban-rural	Inowrocław	Kuyavian-Pomeranian	262.41	19,121	72.87	-7.06
gmina Pakość	urban-rural	Inowrocław	Kuyavian-Pomeranian	86.46	9,763	112.92	-2.28
gmina Rojewo	rural	Inowrocław	Kuyavian-Pomeranian	119.76	4,717	39.39	-0.42
gmina Złotniki Kujawskie	rural	Inowrocław	Kuyavian-Pomeranian	135.53	9,160	67.59	-1.38
Lipno	urban	Lipno	Kuyavian-Pomeranian	10.99	14,307	1301.82	-5.35
gmina Bobrowniki	rural	Lipno	Kuyavian-Pomeranian	95.39	3,086	32.35	-1.72
gmina Chrostkowo	rural	Lipno	Kuyavian-Pomeranian	74.06	2,869	38.74	-6.08
gmina Dobrzyń nad Wisłą	urban-rural	Lipno	Kuyavian-Pomeranian	115.18	7,570	65.72	-6.95
gmina Kikół	rural	Lipno	Kuyavian-Pomeranian	98.3	7,078	72	-4.06
gmina Lipno	rural	Lipno	Kuyavian-Pomeranian	210.04	11,850	56.42	-0.14
gmina Skępe	urban-rural	Lipno	Kuyavian-Pomeranian	178.75	7,497	41.94	-5.15
gmina Tłuchowo	rural	Lipno	Kuyavian-Pomeranian	99.35	4,646	46.76	-2.78
gmina Wielgie	rural	Lipno	Kuyavian-Pomeranian	133.68	6,671	49.9	-7.29
gmina Dąbrowa	rural	Mogilno	Kuyavian-Pomeranian	110.29	4,601	41.72	-1.73
gmina Jeziora Wielkie	rural	Mogilno	Kuyavian-Pomeranian	123.73	4,844	39.15	-7.86
gmina Mogilno	urban-rural	Mogilno	Kuyavian-Pomeranian	256.2	24,526	95.73	-4.2
gmina Strzelno	urban-rural	Mogilno	Kuyavian-Pomeranian	184.9	11,543	62.43	-4.83
gmina Kcynia	urban-rural	Nakło	Kuyavian-Pomeranian	296.63	13,272	44.74	-5.19
gmina Mrocza	urban-rural	Nakło	Kuyavian-Pomeranian	150.51	9,220	61.26	-2.23
gmina Nakło nad Notecią	urban-rural	Nakło	Kuyavian-Pomeranian	186.93	31,620	169.15	-4.86
gmina Sadki	rural	Nakło	Kuyavian-Pomeranian	153.75	7,242	47.1	-1.79
gmina Szubin	urban-rural	Nakło	Kuyavian-Pomeranian	332.26	24,872	74.86	3.97
Radziejów	urban	Radziejów	Kuyavian-Pomeranian	5.69	5,519	969.95	-6.5
gmina Bytoń	rural	Radziejów	Kuyavian-Pomeranian	73.37	3,431	46.76	-8.69
gmina Dobre	rural	Radziejów	Kuyavian-Pomeranian	70.82	5,317	75.08	-7.29
gmina Osięciny	rural	Radziejów	Kuyavian-Pomeranian	123.12	7,572	61.5	-8.06
gmina Piotrków Kujawski	urban-rural	Radziejów	Kuyavian-Pomeranian	138.67	9,219	66.48	-5.19
gmina Radziejów	rural	Radziejów	Kuyavian-Pomeranian	92.65	4,371	47.18	-5.58
gmina Topólka	rural	Radziejów	Kuyavian-Pomeranian	102.88	4,782	46.48	-7.96
Rypin	urban	Rypin	Kuyavian-Pomeranian	10.96	16,073	1466.51	-7.44
gmina Brzuze	rural	Rypin	Kuyavian-Pomeranian	86.4	5,280	61.11	-5.68
gmina Rogowo	rural	Rypin	Kuyavian-Pomeranian	141.01	4,748	33.67	-3.42
gmina Rypin	rural	Rypin	Kuyavian-Pomeranian	132.08	7,495	56.75	-3.09
gmina Skrwilno	rural	Rypin	Kuyavian-Pomeranian	122.81	5,846	47.6	-7.42
gmina Wąpielsk	rural	Rypin	Kuyavian-Pomeranian	93.21	3,966	42.55	-6.14
gmina Kamień Krajeński	urban-rural	Sępólno	Kuyavian-Pomeranian	163.31	6,875	42.1	-5.66
gmina Sępólno Krajeńskie	urban-rural	Sępólno	Kuyavian-Pomeranian	229.12	15,752	68.75	-4.32
gmina Sośno	rural	Sępólno	Kuyavian-Pomeranian	162.64	4,955	30.47	-5.72
gmina Więcbork	urban-rural	Sępólno	Kuyavian-Pomeranian	236.02	13,340	56.52	-0.7
gmina Bukowiec	rural	Świecie	Kuyavian-Pomeranian	111	5,125	46.17	0.72
gmina Dragacz	rural	Świecie	Kuyavian-Pomeranian	111.81	7,227	64.64	-1.98
gmina Drzycim	rural	Świecie	Kuyavian-Pomeranian	108.41	4,880	45.01	-9.65
gmina Jeżewo	rural	Świecie	Kuyavian-Pomeranian	156.46	8,049	51.44	-1.82
gmina Lniano	rural	Świecie	Kuyavian-Pomeranian	88.39	4,335	49.04	2.71
gmina Nowe	urban-rural	Świecie	Kuyavian-Pomeranian	106.71	10,151	95.13	-8.55
gmina Osie	rural	Świecie	Kuyavian-Pomeranian	209.04	5,511	26.36	2.55
gmina Pruszcz	rural	Świecie	Kuyavian-Pomeranian	142.49	9,575	67.2	-0.76
gmina Świecie	urban-rural	Świecie	Kuyavian-Pomeranian	174.93	33,947	194.06	-1.77
gmina Świekatowo	rural	Świecie	Kuyavian-Pomeranian	63.83	3,636	56.96	3.23
gmina Warlubie	rural	Świecie	Kuyavian-Pomeranian	201.11	6,494	32.29	-3.57
Chełmża	urban	Toruń	Kuyavian-Pomeranian	7.84	14,412	1838.27	-6.91
gmina Chełmża	rural	Toruń	Kuyavian-Pomeranian	178.95	9,821	54.88	-0.51
gmina Czernikowo	rural	Toruń	Kuyavian-Pomeranian	170.14	9,061	53.26	-0.66
gmina Lubicz	rural	Toruń	Kuyavian-Pomeranian	105.75	20,267	191.65	11.41
gmina Łubianka	rural	Toruń	Kuyavian-Pomeranian	84.5	7,367	87.18	20.74
gmina Łysomice	rural	Toruń	Kuyavian-Pomeranian	126.94	10,196	80.32	12.09
gmina Obrowo	rural	Toruń	Kuyavian-Pomeranian	162.17	18,039	111.24	36.41
gmina Wielka Nieszawka	rural	Toruń	Kuyavian-Pomeranian	216.22	5,270	24.37	13.65
gmina Zławieś Wielka	rural	Toruń	Kuyavian-Pomeranian	177.91	14,505	81.53	17.09
gmina Cekcyn	rural	Tuchola	Kuyavian-Pomeranian	253.26	6,865	27.11	4.31
gmina Gostycyn	rural	Tuchola	Kuyavian-Pomeranian	135.8	5,187	38.2	-3.89
gmina Kęsowo	rural	Tuchola	Kuyavian-Pomeranian	109.22	4,495	41.16	2.76
gmina Lubiewo	rural	Tuchola	Kuyavian-Pomeranian	162.8	5,976	36.71	3.37
gmina Śliwice	rural	Tuchola	Kuyavian-Pomeranian	174.72	5,596	32.03	-3.55
gmina Tuchola	urban-rural	Tuchola	Kuyavian-Pomeranian	239.66	20,219	84.37	-3.24
Wąbrzeźno	urban	Wąbrzeźno	Kuyavian-Pomeranian	8.53	13,483	1580.66	-7.5
gmina Dębowa Łąka	rural	Wąbrzeźno	Kuyavian-Pomeranian	86.12	3,152	36.6	-2.32
gmina Książki	rural	Wąbrzeźno	Kuyavian-Pomeranian	86.19	4,134	47.96	-4.55
gmina Płużnica	rural	Wąbrzeźno	Kuyavian-Pomeranian	120.38	4,767	39.6	-5.19
gmina Ryńsk	rural	Wąbrzeźno	Kuyavian-Pomeranian	200.73	8,579	42.74	-2.44
Kowal	urban	Włocławek	Kuyavian-Pomeranian	4.68	3,497	747.22	-4.44
gmina Baruchowo	rural	Włocławek	Kuyavian-Pomeranian	106.74	3,427	32.11	-7.76
gmina Boniewo	rural	Włocławek	Kuyavian-Pomeranian	77.62	3,361	43.3	-6.85
gmina Brześć Kujawski	urban-rural	Włocławek	Kuyavian-Pomeranian	150.95	11,408	75.57	-2.62
gmina Choceń	rural	Włocławek	Kuyavian-Pomeranian	99.85	7,937	79.49	-2.51
gmina Chodecz	urban-rural	Włocławek	Kuyavian-Pomeranian	122.09	5,980	48.98	-7.36
gmina Fabianki	rural	Włocławek	Kuyavian-Pomeranian	75.84	10,158	133.94	5.61
gmina Izbica Kujawska	urban-rural	Włocławek	Kuyavian-Pomeranian	132.1	7,644	57.87	-3.55
gmina Kowal	rural	Włocławek	Kuyavian-Pomeranian	114.79	3,904	34.01	-2.63
gmina Lubanie	rural	Włocławek	Kuyavian-Pomeranian	69.41	4,558	65.67	-3.85
gmina Lubień Kujawski	urban-rural	Włocławek	Kuyavian-Pomeranian	150.91	7,288	48.29	-4.67
gmina Lubraniec	urban-rural	Włocławek	Kuyavian-Pomeranian	148.03	9,382	63.38	-7.35
gmina Włocławek	rural	Włocławek	Kuyavian-Pomeranian	220.62	7,349	33.31	7.93
gmina Barcin	urban-rural	Żnin	Kuyavian-Pomeranian	120.88	14,744	121.97	-3.26
gmina Gąsawa	rural	Żnin	Kuyavian-Pomeranian	135.84	5,302	39.03	3.93
gmina Janowiec Wielkopolski	urban-rural	Żnin	Kuyavian-Pomeranian	130.73	8,955	68.5	-6.32
gmina Łabiszyn	urban-rural	Żnin	Kuyavian-Pomeranian	167	10,263	61.46	8.66
gmina Rogowo	rural	Żnin	Kuyavian-Pomeranian	178.85	6,805	38.05	-3.79
gmina Żnin	urban-rural	Żnin	Kuyavian-Pomeranian	251.47	24,001	95.44	-4.6
**Bydgoszcz**	urban	city with county rights	Kuyavian-Pomeranian	175.98	346,739	1970.33	-6.15
**Grudziądz**	urban	city with county rights	Kuyavian-Pomeranian	57.76	94,076	1628.74	-5.97
**Toruń**	urban	city with county rights	Kuyavian-Pomeranian	115.72	201,106	1737.87	-2.29
**Włocławek**	urban	city with county rights	Kuyavian-Pomeranian	84.32	109,347	1296.81	-8.27
Międzyrzec Podlaski	urban	Biała	Lublin	20.03	16,737	835.6	-4.28
Terespol	urban	Biała	Lublin	10.11	5,509	544.91	-7.27
gmina Biała Podlaska	rural	Biała	Lublin	325.4	14,501	44.56	8.27
gmina Drelów	rural	Biała	Lublin	228.06	5,335	23.39	-8.54
gmina Janów Podlaski	rural	Biała	Lublin	135.77	5,273	38.84	-10.64
gmina Kodeń	rural	Biała	Lublin	151.04	3,493	23.13	-14.19
gmina Konstantynów	rural	Biała	Lublin	86.92	4,085	47	-4.29
gmina Leśna Podlaska	rural	Biała	Lublin	98.23	4,293	43.7	0.39
gmina Łomazy	rural	Biała	Lublin	198.6	4,875	24.55	-10.51
gmina Międzyrzec Podlaski	rural	Biała	Lublin	260.92	10,434	39.99	-3.52
gmina Piszczac	rural	Biała	Lublin	170.19	7,168	42.12	-8.32
gmina Rokitno	rural	Biała	Lublin	140.89	2,963	21.03	-7.97
gmina Rossosz	rural	Biała	Lublin	76.48	2,185	28.57	-12.79
gmina Sławatycze	rural	Biała	Lublin	71.89	2,283	31.76	-8.61
gmina Sosnówka	rural	Biała	Lublin	148.36	2,397	16.16	-12.61
gmina Terespol	rural	Biała	Lublin	141.49	6,664	47.1	-6.71
gmina Tuczna	rural	Biała	Lublin	169.57	2,973	17.53	-13
gmina Wisznice	rural	Biała	Lublin	173.2	4,887	28.22	-9.7
gmina Zalesie	rural	Biała	Lublin	147.11	4,399	29.9	-4.36
Biłgoraj	urban	Biłgoraj	Lublin	21.1	26,245	1243.84	-2.99
gmina Aleksandrów	rural	Biłgoraj	Lublin	54.26	3,270	60.27	0.1
gmina Biłgoraj	rural	Biłgoraj	Lublin	262.66	13,374	50.92	3.51
gmina Biszcza	rural	Biłgoraj	Lublin	106.31	3,750	35.27	-8.22
gmina Frampol	urban-rural	Biłgoraj	Lublin	107.6	6,085	56.55	-5.42
gmina Goraj	urban-rural	Biłgoraj	Lublin	67.87	4,077	60.07	-6.77
gmina Józefów	urban-rural	Biłgoraj	Lublin	126.46	6,701	52.99	-7.26
gmina Księżpol	rural	Biłgoraj	Lublin	141.28	6,911	48.92	-2.3
gmina Łukowa	rural	Biłgoraj	Lublin	148.72	4,204	28.27	-6.5
gmina Obsza	rural	Biłgoraj	Lublin	113.23	4,208	37.16	-8.87
gmina Potok Górny	rural	Biłgoraj	Lublin	111.16	5,323	47.89	-10.24
gmina Tarnogród	urban-rural	Biłgoraj	Lublin	114.25	6,623	57.97	-6.02
gmina Tereszpol	rural	Biłgoraj	Lublin	144.01	3,878	26.93	-4.43
gmina Turobin	rural	Biłgoraj	Lublin	162.19	5,968	36.8	-17
Rejowiec Fabryczny	urban	Chełm	Lublin	14.28	4,355	304.97	-6.12
gmina Białopole	rural	Chełm	Lublin	103.61	2,872	27.72	-15.19
gmina Chełm	rural	Chełm	Lublin	221.8	15,045	67.83	10.4
gmina Dorohusk	rural	Chełm	Lublin	192.42	6,357	33.04	-8.25
gmina Dubienka	rural	Chełm	Lublin	96.12	2,308	24.01	-21.04
gmina Kamień	rural	Chełm	Lublin	96.83	4,174	43.11	5.41
gmina Leśniowice	rural	Chełm	Lublin	117.66	3,561	30.27	-9.82
gmina Rejowiec Fabryczny	rural	Chełm	Lublin	87.74	4,225	48.15	-3.53
gmina Ruda-Huta	rural	Chełm	Lublin	112.21	4,483	39.95	-7.25
gmina Sawin	rural	Chełm	Lublin	190.22	5,441	28.6	-7.72
gmina Siedliszcze	urban-rural	Chełm	Lublin	154.14	6,818	44.23	-4.94
gmina Wierzbica	rural	Chełm	Lublin	145.79	5,029	34.49	-9.56
gmina Wojsławice	rural	Chełm	Lublin	110.46	3,724	33.71	-10.86
gmina Żmudź	rural	Chełm	Lublin	136.07	3,032	22.28	-12.02
gmina Rejowiec	urban-rural	Chełm	Lublin	106.25	6,328	59.56	-7.73
Hrubieszów	urban	Hrubieszów	Lublin	33.03	17,401	526.82	-10.83
gmina Dołhobyczów	rural	Hrubieszów	Lublin	212.61	5,295	24.9	-16.97
gmina Horodło	rural	Hrubieszów	Lublin	130.22	5,077	38.99	-12.42
gmina Hrubieszów	rural	Hrubieszów	Lublin	259.21	9,931	38.31	-7.77
gmina Mircze	rural	Hrubieszów	Lublin	234.88	6,953	29.6	-17.58
gmina Trzeszczany	rural	Hrubieszów	Lublin	90.29	4,090	45.3	-14.33
gmina Uchanie	rural	Hrubieszów	Lublin	120.63	4,502	37.32	-12.07
gmina Werbkowice	rural	Hrubieszów	Lublin	187.15	9,224	49.29	-11.86
gmina Batorz	rural	Janów	Lublin	70.84	3,253	45.92	-9.55
gmina Chrzanów	rural	Janów	Lublin	71.69	2,904	40.51	-4.89
gmina Dzwola	rural	Janów	Lublin	200.37	6,196	30.92	-8.72
gmina Godziszów	rural	Janów	Lublin	101.67	5,791	56.96	-6.03
gmina Janów Lubelski	urban-rural	Janów	Lublin	178.7	15,802	88.43	-5.51
gmina Modliborzyce	urban-rural	Janów	Lublin	152.57	6,932	45.43	-5.47
gmina Potok Wielki	rural	Janów	Lublin	99.44	4,625	46.51	-7.8
Krasnystaw	urban	Krasnystaw	Lublin	42.13	18,523	439.66	-7.24
gmina Fajsławice	rural	Krasnystaw	Lublin	70.65	4,575	64.76	-1.74
gmina Gorzków	rural	Krasnystaw	Lublin	96.68	3,416	35.33	-14.22
gmina Izbica	rural	Krasnystaw	Lublin	138.27	8,078	58.42	-9.16
gmina Krasnystaw	rural	Krasnystaw	Lublin	150.82	8,494	56.32	-7.88
gmina Kraśniczyn	rural	Krasnystaw	Lublin	110.09	3,612	32.81	-11.01
gmina Łopiennik Górny	rural	Krasnystaw	Lublin	106.19	3,867	36.42	-11.04
gmina Rudnik	rural	Krasnystaw	Lublin	88.53	2,988	33.75	-11.55
gmina Siennica Różana	rural	Krasnystaw	Lublin	98.4	4,107	41.74	-6.88
gmina Żółkiewka	rural	Krasnystaw	Lublin	129.68	5,280	40.72	-15.01
Kraśnik	urban	Kraśnik	Lublin	26.1	34,148	1308.35	-7.01
gmina Annopol	urban-rural	Kraśnik	Lublin	151.13	8,555	56.61	-9.1
gmina Dzierzkowice	rural	Kraśnik	Lublin	87.29	5,247	60.11	-4.6
gmina Gościeradów	rural	Kraśnik	Lublin	159.29	7,167	44.99	-5.97
gmina Kraśnik	rural	Kraśnik	Lublin	104.66	7,289	69.64	-4.62
gmina Szastarka	rural	Kraśnik	Lublin	73.31	5,749	78.42	-5.56
gmina Trzydnik Duży	rural	Kraśnik	Lublin	104.11	6,395	61.43	-4.14
gmina Urzędów	urban-rural	Kraśnik	Lublin	118.54	8,557	72.19	-4.21
gmina Wilkołaz	rural	Kraśnik	Lublin	81.7	5,520	67.56	-1.98
gmina Zakrzówek	rural	Kraśnik	Lublin	99.17	6,437	64.91	-5.48
Lubartów	urban	Lubartów	Lublin	13.91	21,755	1563.98	-6.22
gmina Abramów	rural	Lubartów	Lublin	84.6	4,015	47.46	-6.72
gmina Firlej	rural	Lubartów	Lublin	126.46	5,869	46.41	-2.82
gmina Jeziorzany	rural	Lubartów	Lublin	66.45	2,758	41.5	-10.07
gmina Kamionka	urban-rural	Lubartów	Lublin	111.69	6,474	57.96	1.08
gmina Kock	urban-rural	Lubartów	Lublin	101.07	6,325	62.58	-8.9
gmina Lubartów	rural	Lubartów	Lublin	158.7	11,838	74.59	8.91
gmina Michów	rural	Lubartów	Lublin	135.99	5,828	42.86	-9.81
gmina Niedźwiada	rural	Lubartów	Lublin	95.76	6,176	64.49	-4.12
gmina Ostrów Lubelski	urban-rural	Lubartów	Lublin	121.58	5,219	42.93	-3.99
gmina Ostrówek	rural	Lubartów	Lublin	89.85	3,821	42.53	-9.92
gmina Serniki	rural	Lubartów	Lublin	75.6	4,909	64.93	-0.07
gmina Uścimów	rural	Lubartów	Lublin	107.08	3,165	29.56	-11.22
gmina Bełżyce	urban-rural	Lublin	Lublin	133.97	13,201	98.54	-3.09
gmina Borzechów	rural	Lublin	Lublin	67.46	3,769	55.87	-0.35
gmina Bychawa	urban-rural	Lublin	Lublin	146.37	11,577	79.09	-5.92
gmina Garbów	rural	Lublin	Lublin	102.62	9,045	88.14	0.85
gmina Głusk	rural	Lublin	Lublin	64.25	11,752	182.91	35.48
gmina Jabłonna	rural	Lublin	Lublin	131.21	8,075	61.54	2.99
gmina Jastków	rural	Lublin	Lublin	113.13	14,275	126.18	10.56
gmina Konopnica	rural	Lublin	Lublin	93.06	14,167	152.24	15.43
gmina Krzczonów	rural	Lublin	Lublin	127.95	4,329	33.83	-14.22
gmina Niedrzwica Duża	rural	Lublin	Lublin	106.73	11,913	111.62	3.04
gmina Niemce	rural	Lublin	Lublin	141.11	19,916	141.14	12.54
gmina Strzyżewice	rural	Lublin	Lublin	108.8	8,131	74.73	4.59
gmina Wojciechów	rural	Lublin	Lublin	80.79	5,981	74.03	0.28
gmina Wólka	rural	Lublin	Lublin	72.76	12,639	173.71	20.6
gmina Wysokie	rural	Lublin	Lublin	113.9	4,360	38.28	-14.77
gmina Zakrzew	rural	Lublin	Lublin	75.42	2,872	38.08	-5.28
gmina Cyców	rural	Łęczna	Lublin	148.11	7,907	53.39	-1.6
gmina Ludwin	rural	Łęczna	Lublin	122.17	5,657	46.3	8.02
gmina Łęczna	urban-rural	Łęczna	Lublin	75.14	23,211	308.9	-3.64
gmina Milejów	rural	Łęczna	Lublin	116.54	9,061	77.75	-4.59
gmina Puchaczów	rural	Łęczna	Lublin	91.53	5,703	62.31	7.41
gmina Spiczyn	rural	Łęczna	Lublin	83.15	5,759	69.26	5.26
Łuków	urban	Łuków	Lublin	35.75	29,621	828.56	-7.96
Stoczek Łukowski	urban	Łuków	Lublin	9.15	2,482	271.26	-9.87
gmina Adamów	rural	Łuków	Lublin	98.67	5,564	56.39	-9.98
gmina Krzywda	rural	Łuków	Lublin	160.96	10,434	64.82	-2.64
gmina Łuków	rural	Łuków	Lublin	307.55	18,301	59.51	5.02
gmina Serokomla	rural	Łuków	Lublin	77.33	3,933	50.86	-7.43
gmina Stanin	rural	Łuków	Lublin	160.82	9,716	60.42	-2.02
gmina Stoczek Łukowski	rural	Łuków	Lublin	173.46	7,770	44.79	-7.19
gmina Trzebieszów	rural	Łuków	Lublin	140.54	7,332	52.17	-6.15
gmina Wojcieszków	rural	Łuków	Lublin	108.91	6,831	62.72	-7.83
gmina Wola Mysłowska	rural	Łuków	Lublin	121.07	4,607	38.05	-8.95
gmina Chodel	rural	Opole	Lublin	108.37	6,547	60.41	-6.78
gmina Józefów nad Wisłą	urban-rural	Opole	Lublin	141.55	6,480	45.78	-12.15
gmina Karczmiska	rural	Opole	Lublin	94.61	5,535	58.5	-6.77
gmina Łaziska	rural	Opole	Lublin	109.29	4,870	44.56	-6.22
gmina Opole Lubelskie	urban-rural	Opole	Lublin	193.72	17,047	88	-7.36
gmina Poniatowa	urban-rural	Opole	Lublin	84.54	14,094	166.71	-8.6
gmina Wilków	rural	Opole	Lublin	77.94	4,379	56.18	-8.9
gmina Dębowa Kłoda	rural	Parczew	Lublin	188.37	3,909	20.75	-1.36
gmina Jabłoń	rural	Parczew	Lublin	110.35	3,861	34.99	-3.34
gmina Milanów	rural	Parczew	Lublin	116.72	3,745	32.09	-12.07
gmina Parczew	urban-rural	Parczew	Lublin	146.8	14,399	98.09	-5.56
gmina Podedwórze	rural	Parczew	Lublin	107.13	1,616	15.08	-11.88
gmina Siemień	rural	Parczew	Lublin	111.21	4,496	40.43	-11.59
gmina Sosnowica	rural	Parczew	Lublin	171.62	2,564	14.94	-6.92
Puławy	urban	Puławy	Lublin	50.49	47,226	935.35	-7.37
gmina Baranów	rural	Puławy	Lublin	84.92	3,848	45.31	-10.93
gmina Janowiec	rural	Puławy	Lublin	78.82	3,663	46.47	-0.73
gmina Kazimierz Dolny	urban-rural	Puławy	Lublin	72.41	6,637	91.66	-7.86
gmina Końskowola	rural	Puławy	Lublin	89.88	8,774	97.62	-4.41
gmina Kurów	rural	Puławy	Lublin	100.99	7,632	75.57	-3.56
gmina Markuszów	rural	Puławy	Lublin	40.4	2,946	72.92	-3.48
gmina Nałęczów	urban-rural	Puławy	Lublin	62.94	8,928	141.85	-0.93
gmina Puławy	rural	Puławy	Lublin	161.19	12,158	75.43	4.59
gmina Wąwolnica	rural	Puławy	Lublin	62.85	4,607	73.3	-9.79
gmina Żyrzyn	rural	Puławy	Lublin	129.2	6,416	49.66	-4.02
Radzyń Podlaski	urban	Radzyń	Lublin	19.31	15,589	807.3	-5.73
gmina Borki	rural	Radzyń	Lublin	111.82	5,965	53.34	-3.83
gmina Czemierniki	rural	Radzyń	Lublin	107.49	4,280	39.82	-10.45
gmina Kąkolewnica	rural	Radzyń	Lublin	147.53	8,004	54.25	-9.04
gmina Komarówka Podlaska	rural	Radzyń	Lublin	137.97	4,151	30.09	-11.99
gmina Radzyń Podlaski	rural	Radzyń	Lublin	154.99	8,078	52.12	-0.95
gmina Ulan-Majorat	rural	Radzyń	Lublin	107.78	5,979	55.47	-3.05
gmina Wohyń	rural	Radzyń	Lublin	178.17	6,558	36.81	-13.02
Dęblin	urban	Ryki	Lublin	38.33	16,007	417.61	-8.78
gmina Kłoczew	rural	Ryki	Lublin	143.06	7,154	50.01	-5.07
gmina Nowodwór	rural	Ryki	Lublin	71.87	4,064	56.55	-7.91
gmina Ryki	urban-rural	Ryki	Lublin	161.76	20,331	125.69	-3.13
gmina Stężyca	rural	Ryki	Lublin	116.04	5,114	44.07	-8.96
gmina Ułęż	rural	Ryki	Lublin	83.47	3,171	37.99	-1.05
Świdnik	urban	Świdnik	Lublin	20.35	39,016	1917.25	-6.94
gmina Mełgiew	rural	Świdnik	Lublin	94.85	9,983	105.25	13.83
gmina Piaski	urban-rural	Świdnik	Lublin	169.86	10,513	61.89	-1.96
gmina Rybczewice	rural	Świdnik	Lublin	99.13	3,353	33.82	-12.32
gmina Trawniki	rural	Świdnik	Lublin	84.16	8,874	105.44	-5.28
Tomaszów Lubelski	urban	Tomaszów	Lublin	13.29	18,941	1425.21	-7.98
gmina Bełżec	rural	Tomaszów	Lublin	33.53	3,288	98.06	-9.84
gmina Jarczów	rural	Tomaszów	Lublin	106.64	3,352	31.43	-14.49
gmina Krynice	rural	Tomaszów	Lublin	73.56	3,208	43.61	-7.37
gmina Lubycza Królewska	urban-rural	Tomaszów	Lublin	208.07	6,146	29.54	-10.51
gmina Łaszczów	urban-rural	Tomaszów	Lublin	128.29	5,935	46.26	-13.18
gmina Rachanie	rural	Tomaszów	Lublin	94.3	5,025	53.29	-13.62
gmina Susiec	rural	Tomaszów	Lublin	190.75	7,412	38.86	-7.01
gmina Tarnawatka	rural	Tomaszów	Lublin	82.83	3,898	47.06	-5.08
gmina Telatyn	rural	Tomaszów	Lublin	111.8	3,874	34.65	-14.86
gmina Tomaszów Lubelski	rural	Tomaszów	Lublin	170.89	11,316	66.22	-0.82
gmina Tyszowce	urban-rural	Tomaszów	Lublin	128.31	5,477	42.69	-12.69
gmina Ulhówek	rural	Tomaszów	Lublin	146.63	4,465	30.45	-22.88
Włodawa	urban	Włodawa	Lublin	17.97	13,002	723.54	-9.61
gmina Hanna	rural	Włodawa	Lublin	139.29	2,827	20.3	-13.98
gmina Hańsk	rural	Włodawa	Lublin	176.27	3,683	20.89	-8.19
gmina Stary Brus	rural	Włodawa	Lublin	131.67	2,089	15.87	-4.43
gmina Urszulin	rural	Włodawa	Lublin	172.14	4,139	24.04	-0.88
gmina Włodawa	rural	Włodawa	Lublin	245.03	6,080	24.81	-1.53
gmina Wola Uhruska	rural	Włodawa	Lublin	154.07	3,840	24.92	-6
gmina Wyryki	rural	Włodawa	Lublin	219.98	2,547	11.58	-8.62
gmina Adamów	rural	Zamość	Lublin	110.66	4,636	41.89	-7.09
gmina Grabowiec	rural	Zamość	Lublin	128.47	3,904	30.39	-17.15
gmina Komarów-Osada	rural	Zamość	Lublin	123.8	4,920	39.74	-12.49
gmina Krasnobród	urban-rural	Zamość	Lublin	126.89	7,081	55.8	-4.85
gmina Łabunie	rural	Zamość	Lublin	87.31	6,198	70.99	-2.46
gmina Miączyn	rural	Zamość	Lublin	156.07	5,669	36.32	-12.78
gmina Nielisz	rural	Zamość	Lublin	112.26	5,417	48.25	-7.81
gmina Radecznica	rural	Zamość	Lublin	109.95	5,601	50.94	-14.73
gmina Sitno	rural	Zamość	Lublin	111.76	6,696	59.91	-4.83
gmina Skierbieszów	rural	Zamość	Lublin	139.21	5,115	36.74	-7.95
gmina Stary Zamość	rural	Zamość	Lublin	97.51	5,150	52.82	-5.13
gmina Sułów	rural	Zamość	Lublin	93.24	4,448	47.7	-10.13
gmina Szczebrzeszyn	urban-rural	Zamość	Lublin	123.5	11,106	89.93	-8.58
gmina Zamość	rural	Zamość	Lublin	196.11	23,225	118.43	5.21
gmina Zwierzyniec	urban-rural	Zamość	Lublin	153.55	6,673	43.46	-9.89
**Biała Podlaska**	urban	city with county rights	Lublin	49.4	57,194	1157.77	-0.84
**Chełm**	urban	city with county rights	Lublin	35.28	61,588	1745.69	-10.29
**Lublin**	urban	city with county rights	Lublin	147.47	339,547	2302.48	-0.67
**Zamość**	urban	city with county rights	Lublin	30.34	63,223	2083.82	-6.57
Kostrzyn nad Odrą	urban	Gorzów	Lubusz	46.14	17,740	384.48	-4.47
gmina Bogdaniec	rural	Gorzów	Lubusz	111.73	7,109	63.63	0.61
gmina Deszczno	rural	Gorzów	Lubusz	168.31	10,039	59.65	15.33
gmina Kłodawa	rural	Gorzów	Lubusz	234.72	8,723	37.16	10.34
gmina Lubiszyn	rural	Gorzów	Lubusz	205.26	6,898	33.61	1.55
gmina Santok	rural	Gorzów	Lubusz	169.39	8,734	51.56	16.24
gmina Witnica	urban-rural	Gorzów	Lubusz	278.68	12,811	45.97	-4.95
Gubin	urban	Krosno	Lubusz	20.68	16,555	800.53	-4.11
gmina Bobrowice	rural	Krosno	Lubusz	184.93	3,167	17.13	-5.41
gmina Bytnica	rural	Krosno	Lubusz	208.73	2,491	11.93	-3.85
gmina Dąbie	rural	Krosno	Lubusz	170.91	4,908	28.72	-7.62
gmina Gubin	rural	Krosno	Lubusz	379.6	7,142	18.81	-4.26
gmina Krosno Odrzańskie	urban-rural	Krosno	Lubusz	212.4	17,639	83.05	-7.65
gmina Maszewo	rural	Krosno	Lubusz	214	2,804	13.1	-1.89
gmina Bledzew	rural	Międzyrzecz	Lubusz	247.48	4,323	17.47	-8.79
gmina Międzyrzecz	urban-rural	Międzyrzecz	Lubusz	315.32	24,734	78.44	-5.29
gmina Przytoczna	rural	Międzyrzecz	Lubusz	184.82	5,609	30.35	-5.41
gmina Pszczew	rural	Międzyrzecz	Lubusz	177.67	4,273	24.05	-0.78
gmina Skwierzyna	urban-rural	Międzyrzecz	Lubusz	284.81	12,028	42.23	-6.4
gmina Trzciel	urban-rural	Międzyrzecz	Lubusz	177.51	6,407	36.09	-6.98
Nowa Sól	urban	Nowa Sól	Lubusz	21.8	38,566	1769.08	-4.42
gmina Bytom Odrzański	urban-rural	Nowa Sól	Lubusz	52.38	5,400	103.09	-4.47
gmina Kolsko	rural	Nowa Sól	Lubusz	80.7	3,315	41.08	-0.3
gmina Kożuchów	urban-rural	Nowa Sól	Lubusz	179.18	15,868	88.56	-4.35
gmina Nowa Sól	rural	Nowa Sól	Lubusz	175.96	6,930	39.38	1.06
gmina Nowe Miasteczko	urban-rural	Nowa Sól	Lubusz	76.86	5,340	69.48	-8.29
gmina Otyń	urban-rural	Nowa Sól	Lubusz	91.69	7,028	76.65	4.11
gmina Siedlisko	rural	Nowa Sól	Lubusz	92.16	3,567	38.7	-8.9
gmina Cybinka	urban-rural	Słubice	Lubusz	279.67	6,464	23.11	-5.1
gmina Górzyca	rural	Słubice	Lubusz	145.42	4,291	29.51	2.58
gmina Ośno Lubuskie	urban-rural	Słubice	Lubusz	197.64	6,364	32.2	-1.88
gmina Rzepin	urban-rural	Słubice	Lubusz	190.99	9,701	50.79	-3.99
gmina Słubice	urban-rural	Słubice	Lubusz	185.57	20,077	108.19	1.01
gmina Dobiegniew	urban-rural	Strzelce-Drezdenko	Lubusz	351.27	6,494	18.49	-9.17
gmina Drezdenko	urban-rural	Strzelce-Drezdenko	Lubusz	399.91	17,065	42.67	-5.28
gmina Stare Kurowo	rural	Strzelce-Drezdenko	Lubusz	77.57	4,058	52.31	-4.48
gmina Strzelce Krajeńskie	urban-rural	Strzelce-Drezdenko	Lubusz	318.98	16,923	53.05	-6.74
gmina Zwierzyn	rural	Strzelce-Drezdenko	Lubusz	100.13	4,315	43.09	-4.21
gmina Krzeszyce	rural	Sulęcin	Lubusz	194.19	4,713	24.27	-1.2
gmina Lubniewice	urban-rural	Sulęcin	Lubusz	129.69	3,142	24.23	3.53
gmina Słońsk	rural	Sulęcin	Lubusz	158.64	4,751	29.95	-1.75
gmina Sulęcin	urban-rural	Sulęcin	Lubusz	320.08	15,702	49.06	-5.02
gmina Torzym	urban-rural	Sulęcin	Lubusz	375.2	6,802	18.13	-0.59
gmina Lubrza	rural	Świebodzin	Lubusz	122.25	3,563	29.15	-0.56
gmina Łagów	rural	Świebodzin	Lubusz	199.14	4,930	24.76	-5.95
gmina Skąpe	rural	Świebodzin	Lubusz	181.36	5,095	28.09	0.59
gmina Szczaniec	rural	Świebodzin	Lubusz	113.33	3,829	33.79	-3.89
gmina Świebodzin	urban-rural	Świebodzin	Lubusz	226.41	29,916	132.13	-3.86
gmina Zbąszynek	urban-rural	Świebodzin	Lubusz	94.08	8,345	88.7	-0.4
gmina Babimost	urban-rural	Zielona Góra	Lubusz	92.77	6,211	66.95	-1.92
gmina Bojadła	rural	Zielona Góra	Lubusz	102.27	3,284	32.11	0.1
gmina Czerwieńsk	urban-rural	Zielona Góra	Lubusz	194.59	9,984	51.31	-1.63
gmina Kargowa	urban-rural	Zielona Góra	Lubusz	128.53	5,812	45.22	-0.23
gmina Nowogród Bobrzański	urban-rural	Zielona Góra	Lubusz	259.69	9,415	36.25	-0.81
gmina Sulechów	urban-rural	Zielona Góra	Lubusz	236.66	26,599	112.39	1.9
gmina Świdnica	rural	Zielona Góra	Lubusz	160.9	6,627	41.19	5.39
gmina Trzebiechów	rural	Zielona Góra	Lubusz	80.96	3,363	41.54	-5.39
gmina Zabór	rural	Zielona Góra	Lubusz	93.38	4,351	46.59	14.26
Gozdnica	urban	Żagań	Lubusz	23.92	2,980	124.58	-17.7
Żagań	urban	Żagań	Lubusz	40.38	25,506	631.65	-7.34
gmina Brzeźnica	rural	Żagań	Lubusz	122.18	3,733	30.55	-1.51
gmina Iłowa	urban-rural	Żagań	Lubusz	153.03	6,823	44.59	-6.03
gmina Małomice	urban-rural	Żagań	Lubusz	79.59	5,154	64.76	-6.83
gmina Niegosławice	rural	Żagań	Lubusz	136.41	4,331	31.75	-13.04
gmina Szprotawa	urban-rural	Żagań	Lubusz	232.53	20,555	88.4	-8.29
gmina Wymiarki	rural	Żagań	Lubusz	63.09	2,250	35.66	-10.73
gmina Żagań	rural	Żagań	Lubusz	280.69	7,302	26.01	-0.09
Łęknica	urban	Żary	Lubusz	16.43	2,434	148.14	-9.14
Żary	urban	Żary	Lubusz	33.49	37,173	1109.97	-6.93
gmina Brody	rural	Żary	Lubusz	240.67	3,367	13.99	-6.26
gmina Jasień	urban-rural	Żary	Lubusz	126.79	6,975	55.01	-5.9
gmina Lipinki Łużyckie	rural	Żary	Lubusz	88.69	3,375	38.05	4.99
gmina Lubsko	urban-rural	Żary	Lubusz	182.67	18,319	100.28	-8.23
gmina Przewóz	rural	Żary	Lubusz	178.32	3,114	17.46	-9.25
gmina Trzebiel	rural	Żary	Lubusz	166.35	5,678	34.13	-4.94
gmina Tuplice	rural	Żary	Lubusz	65.75	3,027	46.04	-9.72
gmina Żary	rural	Żary	Lubusz	293.62	12,339	42.02	-0.57
gmina Sława	urban-rural	Wschowa	Lubusz	327	12,674	38.76	-1.29
gmina Szlichtyngowa	urban-rural	Wschowa	Lubusz	99.74	5,019	50.32	-2.84
gmina Wschowa	urban-rural	Wschowa	Lubusz	197.46	21,094	106.83	-5.5
**Gorzów Wielkopolski**	urban	city with county rights	Lubusz	85.72	123,341	1438.88	-1.68
**Zielona Góra**	urban	city with county rights	Lubusz	278.32	141,280	507.62	4.09
Bełchatów	urban	Bełchatów	Łódź	34.64	56,740	1637.99	-8.33
gmina Bełchatów	rural	Bełchatów	Łódź	180.36	11,690	64.81	15.95
gmina Drużbice	rural	Bełchatów	Łódź	113.35	5,239	46.22	6.9
gmina Kleszczów	rural	Bełchatów	Łódź	124.76	6,370	51.06	27.39
gmina Kluki	rural	Bełchatów	Łódź	118.54	4,393	37.06	6.22
gmina Rusiec	rural	Bełchatów	Łódź	99.91	5,076	50.81	-3.72
gmina Szczerców	rural	Bełchatów	Łódź	128.95	8,235	63.86	3.46
gmina Zelów	urban-rural	Bełchatów	Łódź	167.09	14,959	89.53	-0.98
Kutno	urban	Kutno	Łódź	33.59	43,658	1299.73	-7.31
gmina Bedlno	rural	Kutno	Łódź	126.02	5,329	42.29	-9.21
gmina Dąbrowice	rural	Kutno	Łódź	46.15	1,883	40.8	-2.99
gmina Krośniewice	urban-rural	Kutno	Łódź	94.71	8,295	87.58	-10.5
gmina Krzyżanów	rural	Kutno	Łódź	103.06	4,236	41.1	-3.28
gmina Kutno	rural	Kutno	Łódź	122.31	8,716	71.26	-0.61
gmina Łanięta	rural	Kutno	Łódź	54.89	2,423	44.14	-4.5
gmina Nowe Ostrowy	rural	Kutno	Łódź	71.55	3,414	47.71	-8.16
gmina Oporów	rural	Kutno	Łódź	67.85	2,487	36.65	-13.56
gmina Strzelce	rural	Kutno	Łódź	90.09	3,918	43.49	-7.71
gmina Żychlin	urban-rural	Kutno	Łódź	76.64	11,767	153.54	-9.94
gmina Buczek	rural	Łask	Łódź	92.21	5,088	55.18	0.66
gmina Łask	urban-rural	Łask	Łódź	145.37	27,574	189.68	-3.92
gmina Sędziejowice	rural	Łask	Łódź	120.04	6,360	52.98	-3.23
gmina Widawa	rural	Łask	Łódź	178.31	7,279	40.82	-7.75
gmina Wodzierady	rural	Łask	Łódź	82.3	3,493	42.44	9.73
Łęczyca	urban	Łęczyca	Łódź	8.95	13,889	1551.84	-9.58
gmina Daszyna	rural	Łęczyca	Łódź	80.91	3,853	47.62	-7.67
gmina Góra Świętej Małgorzaty	rural	Łęczyca	Łódź	90.26	4,342	48.11	-5.62
gmina Grabów	rural	Łęczyca	Łódź	154.96	5,850	37.75	-11.47
gmina Łęczyca	rural	Łęczyca	Łódź	150.57	8,554	56.81	0.98
gmina Piątek	urban-rural	Łęczyca	Łódź	133.18	5,960	44.75	-7.66
gmina Świnice Warckie	rural	Łęczyca	Łódź	93.47	3,891	41.63	-5
gmina Witonia	rural	Łęczyca	Łódź	60.45	3,223	53.32	-8.84
Łowicz	urban	Łowicz	Łódź	23.42	28,059	1198.08	-8.3
gmina Bielawy	rural	Łowicz	Łódź	163.9	5,288	32.26	-13.02
gmina Chąśno	rural	Łowicz	Łódź	71.83	2,910	40.51	-2.96
gmina Domaniewice	rural	Łowicz	Łódź	86.17	4,638	53.82	-0.72
gmina Kiernozia	rural	Łowicz	Łódź	76.23	3,357	44.04	-8.68
gmina Kocierzew Południowy	rural	Łowicz	Łódź	93.7	4,207	44.9	-6.1
gmina Łowicz	rural	Łowicz	Łódź	133.15	7,705	57.87	1.65
gmina Łyszkowice	rural	Łowicz	Łódź	107.3	6,653	62	-2.1
gmina Nieborów	rural	Łowicz	Łódź	103.9	9,338	89.87	-1.53
gmina Zduny	rural	Łowicz	Łódź	128.57	5,687	44.23	-5.91
gmina Andrespol	rural	Łódź East	Łódź	25.74	14,282	554.86	10.76
gmina Brójce	rural	Łódź East	Łódź	69.02	6,723	97.41	11.93
gmina Koluszki	urban-rural	Łódź East	Łódź	154.8	23,329	150.7	1.63
gmina Nowosolna	rural	Łódź East	Łódź	53.98	5,123	94.91	20.95
gmina Rzgów	urban-rural	Łódź East	Łódź	66.32	10,517	158.58	11.54
gmina Tuszyn	urban-rural	Łódź East	Łódź	129.9	12,434	95.72	4
gmina Białaczów	rural	Opoczno	Łódź	114.63	5,754	50.2	-3.97
gmina Drzewica	urban-rural	Opoczno	Łódź	118.19	10,400	87.99	-6.36
gmina Mniszków	rural	Opoczno	Łódź	124.16	4,752	38.27	1.27
gmina Opoczno	urban-rural	Opoczno	Łódź	190.64	33,988	178.28	-5.97
gmina Paradyż	rural	Opoczno	Łódź	81.39	4,346	53.4	-6.21
gmina Poświętne	rural	Opoczno	Łódź	140.81	3,115	22.12	-10.27
gmina Sławno	rural	Opoczno	Łódź	129.31	7,624	58.96	0.35
gmina Żarnów	rural	Opoczno	Łódź	141.06	5,868	41.6	-7.17
Konstantynów Łódzki	urban	Pabianice	Łódź	27.25	18,270	670.46	6.73
Pabianice	urban	Pabianice	Łódź	32.99	64,445	1953.47	-7.85
gmina Dłutów	rural	Pabianice	Łódź	101.23	4,675	46.18	8.48
gmina Dobroń	rural	Pabianice	Łódź	95.46	7,770	81.4	6.08
gmina Ksawerów	rural	Pabianice	Łódź	13.64	7,670	562.32	-1.47
gmina Lutomiersk	rural	Pabianice	Łódź	133.92	8,691	64.9	17.26
gmina Pabianice	rural	Pabianice	Łódź	87.69	7,704	87.85	23.14
gmina Działoszyn	urban-rural	Pajęczno	Łódź	120.92	12,387	102.44	-7.61
gmina Kiełczygłów	rural	Pajęczno	Łódź	87.2	3,972	45.55	-10.44
gmina Nowa Brzeźnica	rural	Pajęczno	Łódź	135.21	4,533	33.53	-6.32
gmina Pajęczno	urban-rural	Pajęczno	Łódź	113.63	11,488	101.1	-5.79
gmina Rząśnia	rural	Pajęczno	Łódź	86.14	4,935	57.29	3.88
gmina Siemkowice	rural	Pajęczno	Łódź	99.98	4,758	47.59	-3.96
gmina Strzelce Wielkie	rural	Pajęczno	Łódź	78	4,561	58.47	-5.35
gmina Sulmierzyce	rural	Pajęczno	Łódź	82.74	4,437	53.63	-1.27
gmina Aleksandrów	rural	Piotrków	Łódź	144.09	4,300	29.84	-6.05
gmina Czarnocin	rural	Piotrków	Łódź	71.79	4,145	57.74	3.4
gmina Gorzkowice	rural	Piotrków	Łódź	102.17	8,483	83.03	-1.29
gmina Grabica	rural	Piotrków	Łódź	127.62	6,061	47.49	-1.21
gmina Łęki Szlacheckie	rural	Piotrków	Łódź	108.96	3,418	31.37	-10.04
gmina Moszczenica	rural	Piotrków	Łódź	111.49	12,922	115.9	2.65
gmina Ręczno	rural	Piotrków	Łódź	88.9	3,522	39.62	-3.94
gmina Rozprza	rural	Piotrków	Łódź	163.08	12,322	75.56	-0.03
gmina Sulejów	urban-rural	Piotrków	Łódź	188.23	16,340	86.81	1.72
gmina Wola Krzysztoporska	rural	Piotrków	Łódź	170.75	11,972	70.11	1.65
gmina Wolbórz	urban-rural	Piotrków	Łódź	151.66	7,875	51.93	5.17
gmina Dalików	rural	Poddębice	Łódź	114.62	3,920	34.2	2.82
gmina Pęczniew	rural	Poddębice	Łódź	127.79	3,484	27.26	-2.1
gmina Poddębice	urban-rural	Poddębice	Łódź	224.54	15,432	68.73	-5.98
gmina Uniejów	urban-rural	Poddębice	Łódź	129.01	6,999	54.25	-2.61
gmina Wartkowice	rural	Poddębice	Łódź	140.12	6,244	44.56	0
gmina Zadzim	rural	Poddębice	Łódź	145.13	4,958	34.16	-4.46
Radomsko	urban	Radomsko	Łódź	51.43	45,686	888.31	-5.13
gmina Dobryszyce	rural	Radomsko	Łódź	50.82	4,499	88.53	6.07
gmina Gidle	rural	Radomsko	Łódź	115.98	6,015	51.86	-8.28
gmina Gomunice	rural	Radomsko	Łódź	62.45	5,853	93.72	-3.11
gmina Kamieńsk	urban-rural	Radomsko	Łódź	96.44	5,856	60.72	-7.02
gmina Kobiele Wielkie	rural	Radomsko	Łódź	101.72	4,426	43.51	-1.35
gmina Kodrąb	rural	Radomsko	Łódź	105.83	4,493	42.45	-6.44
gmina Lgota Wielka	rural	Radomsko	Łódź	63.07	4,268	67.67	-2.8
gmina Ładzice	rural	Radomsko	Łódź	82.77	4,754	57.44	-2.51
gmina Masłowice	rural	Radomsko	Łódź	115.97	4,142	35.72	-3.12
gmina Przedbórz	urban-rural	Radomsko	Łódź	189.7	7,093	37.39	-7.23
gmina Radomsko	rural	Radomsko	Łódź	85.63	5,567	65.01	-5.45
gmina Wielgomłyny	rural	Radomsko	Łódź	123.15	4,538	36.85	-10.71
gmina Żytno	rural	Radomsko	Łódź	197.61	5,065	25.63	-9.05
Rawa Mazowiecka	urban	Rawa	Łódź	14.3	17,291	1209.16	-4.49
gmina Biała Rawska	urban-rural	Rawa	Łódź	208.31	11,257	54.04	-5.16
gmina Cielądz	rural	Rawa	Łódź	92.93	3,939	42.39	-4.2
gmina Rawa Mazowiecka	rural	Rawa	Łódź	163.23	8,792	53.86	3.59
gmina Regnów	rural	Rawa	Łódź	46.35	1,825	39.37	-0.18
gmina Sadkowice	rural	Rawa	Łódź	121.08	5,400	44.6	-8.97
Sieradz	urban	Sieradz	Łódź	51.22	41,724	814.6	-7.31
gmina Błaszki	urban-rural	Sieradz	Łódź	201.38	14,425	71.63	-6.05
gmina Brąszewice	rural	Sieradz	Łódź	106.63	4,465	41.87	-4.81
gmina Brzeźnio	rural	Sieradz	Łódź	128.63	6,372	49.54	2.63
gmina Burzenin	rural	Sieradz	Łódź	120.35	5,521	45.87	0
gmina Goszczanów	rural	Sieradz	Łódź	121.54	5,449	44.83	-3.28
gmina Klonowa	rural	Sieradz	Łódź	94.98	2,876	30.28	-3.8
gmina Sieradz	rural	Sieradz	Łódź	181.6	10,763	59.27	8.06
gmina Warta	urban-rural	Sieradz	Łódź	254.34	12,589	49.5	-5.91
gmina Wróblew	rural	Sieradz	Łódź	112.9	6,057	53.65	-2.79
gmina Złoczew	urban-rural	Sieradz	Łódź	117.26	7,129	60.8	-3.11
gmina Bolimów	rural	Skierniewice	Łódź	111.71	4,024	36.02	-3.13
gmina Głuchów	rural	Skierniewice	Łódź	110.73	5,699	51.47	-7.66
gmina Godzianów	rural	Skierniewice	Łódź	44.06	2,659	60.35	4.55
gmina Kowiesy	rural	Skierniewice	Łódź	85.83	2,886	33.62	-3.56
gmina Lipce Reymontowskie	rural	Skierniewice	Łódź	42.91	3,289	76.65	0.3
gmina Maków	rural	Skierniewice	Łódź	81.53	5,990	73.47	0.61
gmina Nowy Kawęczyn	rural	Skierniewice	Łódź	104.22	3,374	32.37	-0.39
gmina Skierniewice	rural	Skierniewice	Łódź	131.3	7,632	58.13	7.04
gmina Słupia	rural	Skierniewice	Łódź	41.09	2,603	63.35	-5.95
Tomaszów Mazowiecki	urban	Tomaszów	Łódź	41.3	61,645	1492.62	-9.13
gmina Będków	rural	Tomaszów	Łódź	57.74	3,257	56.41	-6.66
gmina Budziszewice	rural	Tomaszów	Łódź	30.17	2,156	71.46	-6.11
gmina Czerniewice	rural	Tomaszów	Łódź	128.07	5,039	39.35	-6.21
gmina Inowłódz	rural	Tomaszów	Łódź	97.83	3,814	38.99	-1.22
gmina Lubochnia	rural	Tomaszów	Łódź	131.37	7,200	54.81	0.74
gmina Rokiciny	rural	Tomaszów	Łódź	90.58	6,157	67.97	-0.32
gmina Rzeczyca	rural	Tomaszów	Łódź	108.61	4,629	42.62	-1.51
gmina Tomaszów Mazowiecki	rural	Tomaszów	Łódź	149.82	11,228	74.94	7.32
gmina Ujazd	rural	Tomaszów	Łódź	96.95	7,717	79.6	-3.69
gmina Żelechlinek	rural	Tomaszów	Łódź	92.35	3,299	35.72	-4.9
gmina Biała	rural	Wieluń	Łódź	74.09	5,421	73.17	-5.29
gmina Czarnożyły	rural	Wieluń	Łódź	69.67	4,516	64.82	-2.13
gmina Konopnica	rural	Wieluń	Łódź	83.17	3,746	45.04	-7.19
gmina Mokrsko	rural	Wieluń	Łódź	77.68	5,392	69.41	-1.54
gmina Osjaków	rural	Wieluń	Łódź	101.09	4,733	46.82	-1.54
gmina Ostrówek	rural	Wieluń	Łódź	101.38	4,498	44.37	-4.48
gmina Pątnów	rural	Wieluń	Łódź	114.74	6,528	56.89	-1.93
gmina Skomlin	rural	Wieluń	Łódź	55.2	3,324	60.22	-2.79
gmina Wieluń	urban-rural	Wieluń	Łódź	130.64	31,313	239.69	-6.05
gmina Wierzchlas	rural	Wieluń	Łódź	118.82	6,610	55.63	-0.45
gmina Bolesławiec	rural	Wieruszów	Łódź	64.47	4,088	63.41	0.57
gmina Czastary	rural	Wieruszów	Łódź	62.73	3,981	63.46	1.85
gmina Galewice	rural	Wieruszów	Łódź	135.77	6,096	44.9	-6.96
gmina Lututów	urban-rural	Wieruszów	Łódź	76.12	4,581	60.18	-1.45
gmina Łubnice	rural	Wieruszów	Łódź	60.83	4,017	66.04	-8.32
gmina Sokolniki	rural	Wieruszów	Łódź	80.01	5,040	62.99	5.75
gmina Wieruszów	urban-rural	Wieruszów	Łódź	97.2	14,247	146.57	-0.65
Zduńska Wola	urban	Zduńska Wola	Łódź	24.57	41,499	1689.01	-8.08
gmina Szadek	urban-rural	Zduńska Wola	Łódź	151.64	7,306	48.18	-3.53
gmina Zapolice	rural	Zduńska Wola	Łódź	81.41	5,206	63.95	5.31
gmina Zduńska Wola	rural	Zduńska Wola	Łódź	111.61	12,221	109.5	3.38
Głowno	urban	Zgierz	Łódź	19.84	14,041	707.71	-10.53
Ozorków	urban	Zgierz	Łódź	15.46	19,260	1245.8	-7.84
Zgierz	urban	Zgierz	Łódź	42.33	55,985	1322.58	-4.55
gmina Aleksandrów Łódzki	urban-rural	Zgierz	Łódź	116.43	32,488	279.03	13.32
gmina Głowno	rural	Zgierz	Łódź	104.77	4,817	45.98	0.83
gmina Ozorków	rural	Zgierz	Łódź	95.51	7,044	73.75	3.86
gmina Parzęczew	rural	Zgierz	Łódź	103.89	5,157	49.64	6.88
gmina Stryków	urban-rural	Zgierz	Łódź	157.9	12,746	80.72	7.19
gmina Zgierz	rural	Zgierz	Łódź	199.05	14,616	73.43	17.59
Brzeziny	urban	Brzeziny	Łódź	21.58	12,474	578.04	-1.04
gmina Brzeziny	rural	Brzeziny	Łódź	106.64	5,799	54.38	7.35
gmina Dmosin	rural	Brzeziny	Łódź	100.19	4,457	44.49	-2.38
gmina Jeżów	rural	Brzeziny	Łódź	64.09	3,360	52.43	-8.1
gmina Rogów	rural	Brzeziny	Łódź	66.06	4,703	71.19	-4.56
**Łódź**	urban	city with county rights	Łódź	293.25	677,286	2309.59	-8
**Piotrków Trybunalski**	urban	city with county rights	Łódź	67.24	72,785	1082.47	-7.6
**Skierniewice**	urban	city with county rights	Łódź	34.6	47,932	1385.32	-2.53
Bochnia	urban	Bochnia	Lesser Poland	29.87	29,733	995.41	-2.68
gmina Bochnia	rural	Bochnia	Lesser Poland	130.87	20,091	153.52	6.73
gmina Drwinia	rural	Bochnia	Lesser Poland	108.33	6,516	60.15	0.46
gmina Lipnica Murowana	rural	Bochnia	Lesser Poland	60.3	5,634	93.43	0
gmina Łapanów	rural	Bochnia	Lesser Poland	71.7	8,197	114.32	6.88
gmina Nowy Wiśnicz	urban-rural	Bochnia	Lesser Poland	82.16	14,230	173.2	7.9
gmina Rzezawa	rural	Bochnia	Lesser Poland	86.35	11,387	131.87	5.65
gmina Trzciana	rural	Bochnia	Lesser Poland	44.09	5,651	128.17	9.07
gmina Żegocina	rural	Bochnia	Lesser Poland	34.89	5,584	160.05	6.1
gmina Borzęcin	rural	Brzesko	Lesser Poland	102.7	8,304	80.86	-2.99
gmina Brzesko	urban-rural	Brzesko	Lesser Poland	102.66	36,258	353.19	0.16
gmina Czchów	urban-rural	Brzesko	Lesser Poland	66.43	9,848	148.25	-0.03
gmina Dębno	rural	Brzesko	Lesser Poland	81.6	14,734	180.56	2.25
gmina Gnojnik	rural	Brzesko	Lesser Poland	54.99	8,042	146.24	3.93
gmina Iwkowa	rural	Brzesko	Lesser Poland	47.22	6,490	137.44	6.14
gmina Szczurowa	rural	Brzesko	Lesser Poland	134.92	9,449	70.03	-5.27
gmina Alwernia	urban-rural	Chrzanów	Lesser Poland	74.17	12,505	168.6	-4.28
gmina Babice	rural	Chrzanów	Lesser Poland	54.04	9,097	168.34	-0.44
gmina Chrzanów	urban-rural	Chrzanów	Lesser Poland	79.44	46,650	587.24	-5.27
gmina Libiąż	urban-rural	Chrzanów	Lesser Poland	57.07	22,236	389.63	-4.03
gmina Trzebinia	urban-rural	Chrzanów	Lesser Poland	105.4	33,702	319.75	-4.48
gmina Bolesław	rural	Dąbrowa	Lesser Poland	35.7	2,598	72.77	-15.42
gmina Dąbrowa Tarnowska	urban-rural	Dąbrowa	Lesser Poland	116.46	21,254	182.5	0.53
gmina Gręboszów	rural	Dąbrowa	Lesser Poland	48.51	3,322	68.48	-3.29
gmina Mędrzechów	rural	Dąbrowa	Lesser Poland	44.4	3,414	76.89	-11.36
gmina Olesno	rural	Dąbrowa	Lesser Poland	77.6	7,976	102.78	2.48
gmina Radgoszcz	rural	Dąbrowa	Lesser Poland	88.1	7,438	84.43	1.12
gmina Szczucin	urban-rural	Dąbrowa	Lesser Poland	119.48	13,145	110.02	-0.94
Gorlice	urban	Gorlice	Lesser Poland	23.53	27,231	1157.29	-6.7
gmina Biecz	urban-rural	Gorlice	Lesser Poland	98.25	16,805	171.04	-1.58
gmina Bobowa	urban-rural	Gorlice	Lesser Poland	49.77	9,804	196.99	2.15
gmina Gorlice	rural	Gorlice	Lesser Poland	102.85	17,292	168.13	2.91
gmina Lipinki	rural	Gorlice	Lesser Poland	66.46	6,782	102.05	-0.54
gmina Łużna	rural	Gorlice	Lesser Poland	56.27	8,530	151.59	3.07
gmina Moszczenica	rural	Gorlice	Lesser Poland	37.62	4,983	132.46	5.07
gmina Ropa	rural	Gorlice	Lesser Poland	49.11	5,521	112.42	4.69
gmina Sękowa	rural	Gorlice	Lesser Poland	194.8	4,967	25.5	-1.27
gmina Uście Gorlickie	rural	Gorlice	Lesser Poland	287.8	6,863	23.85	1.36
gmina Czernichów	rural	Kraków	Lesser Poland	84.22	14,727	174.86	5.12
gmina Igołomia-Wawrzeńczyce	rural	Kraków	Lesser Poland	62.79	7,706	122.73	-0.22
gmina Iwanowice	rural	Kraków	Lesser Poland	71.09	9,183	129.17	5.17
gmina Jerzmanowice-Przeginia	rural	Kraków	Lesser Poland	68.14	10,960	160.85	1.89
gmina Kocmyrzów-Luborzyca	rural	Kraków	Lesser Poland	80.76	15,863	196.42	14.91
gmina Krzeszowice	urban-rural	Kraków	Lesser Poland	139.04	32,161	231.31	-0.62
gmina Liszki	rural	Kraków	Lesser Poland	72.07	17,483	242.58	8.47
gmina Michałowice	rural	Kraków	Lesser Poland	51.13	10,846	212.13	18.95
gmina Mogilany	rural	Kraków	Lesser Poland	43.63	14,297	327.69	13.56
gmina Skała	urban-rural	Kraków	Lesser Poland	74.83	10,597	141.61	2.18
gmina Skawina	urban-rural	Kraków	Lesser Poland	99.84	43,650	437.2	2.04
gmina Słomniki	urban-rural	Kraków	Lesser Poland	112.98	13,635	120.69	-1.05
gmina Sułoszowa	rural	Kraków	Lesser Poland	53.38	5,812	108.88	0.17
gmina Świątniki Górne	urban-rural	Kraków	Lesser Poland	20.35	10,254	503.88	11.81
gmina Wielka Wieś	rural	Kraków	Lesser Poland	48.27	12,923	267.72	32.11
gmina Zabierzów	rural	Kraków	Lesser Poland	99.42	26,898	270.55	11.94
gmina Zielonki	rural	Kraków	Lesser Poland	48.58	23,408	481.84	19.54
Limanowa	urban	Limanowa	Lesser Poland	18.7	15,142	809.73	0.31
Mszana Dolna	urban	Limanowa	Lesser Poland	27.1	7,900	291.51	-1.6
gmina Dobra	rural	Limanowa	Lesser Poland	109.91	10,003	91.01	1.91
gmina Jodłownik	rural	Limanowa	Lesser Poland	72.19	8,701	120.53	5.3
gmina Kamienica	rural	Limanowa	Lesser Poland	95.18	7,872	82.71	3.32
gmina Laskowa	rural	Limanowa	Lesser Poland	72.48	8,224	113.47	5.99
gmina Limanowa	rural	Limanowa	Lesser Poland	152.23	25,710	168.89	8.02
gmina Łukowica	rural	Limanowa	Lesser Poland	69.65	10,109	145.14	6.48
gmina Mszana Dolna	rural	Limanowa	Lesser Poland	170.02	17,595	103.49	0.91
gmina Niedźwiedź	rural	Limanowa	Lesser Poland	74.22	7,358	99.14	1.73
gmina Słopnice	rural	Limanowa	Lesser Poland	56.85	6,803	119.67	7.61
gmina Tymbark	rural	Limanowa	Lesser Poland	32.7	6,580	201.22	3.52
gmina Charsznica	rural	Miechów	Lesser Poland	78.45	7,395	94.26	-4.69
gmina Gołcza	rural	Miechów	Lesser Poland	90.02	6,043	67.13	-5.78
gmina Kozłów	rural	Miechów	Lesser Poland	85.75	4,572	53.32	-9.02
gmina Książ Wielki	rural	Miechów	Lesser Poland	137.83	5,049	36.63	-5.61
gmina Miechów	urban-rural	Miechów	Lesser Poland	148.36	19,607	132.16	-3.46
gmina Racławice	rural	Miechów	Lesser Poland	59.11	2,509	42.45	1.47
gmina Słaboszów	rural	Miechów	Lesser Poland	76.77	3,514	45.77	-8.49
gmina Dobczyce	urban-rural	Myślenice	Lesser Poland	66.39	15,330	230.91	2.47
gmina Lubień	rural	Myślenice	Lesser Poland	75.1	10,090	134.35	3.29
gmina Myślenice	urban-rural	Myślenice	Lesser Poland	153.52	44,530	290.06	5.05
gmina Pcim	rural	Myślenice	Lesser Poland	88.96	11,119	124.99	4.17
gmina Raciechowice	rural	Myślenice	Lesser Poland	61.15	6,441	105.33	8.21
gmina Siepraw	rural	Myślenice	Lesser Poland	31.85	9,044	283.96	10.08
gmina Sułkowice	urban-rural	Myślenice	Lesser Poland	60.38	15,044	249.16	5.62
gmina Tokarnia	rural	Myślenice	Lesser Poland	68.63	8,861	129.11	5.55
gmina Wiśniowa	rural	Myślenice	Lesser Poland	67.1	7,413	110.48	3.53
Grybów	urban	Nowy Sącz	Lesser Poland	16.95	6,000	353.98	-4.19
gmina Chełmiec	rural	Nowy Sącz	Lesser Poland	111.97	28,927	258.35	9.63
gmina Gródek nad Dunajcem	rural	Nowy Sącz	Lesser Poland	88.19	9,253	104.92	3.08
gmina Grybów	rural	Nowy Sącz	Lesser Poland	153.15	25,605	167.19	8.07
gmina Kamionka Wielka	rural	Nowy Sącz	Lesser Poland	64.98	10,467	161.08	6.22
gmina Korzenna	rural	Nowy Sącz	Lesser Poland	106.95	14,524	135.8	3.82
gmina Krynica-Zdrój	urban-rural	Nowy Sącz	Lesser Poland	145.13	16,640	114.66	-3.97
gmina Łabowa	rural	Nowy Sącz	Lesser Poland	119.15	6,108	51.26	6.58
gmina Łącko	rural	Nowy Sącz	Lesser Poland	132.95	16,570	124.63	3.77
gmina Łososina Dolna	rural	Nowy Sącz	Lesser Poland	84.76	11,152	131.57	7.68
gmina Muszyna	urban-rural	Nowy Sącz	Lesser Poland	141.44	11,543	81.61	-1.38
gmina Nawojowa	rural	Nowy Sącz	Lesser Poland	50.21	8,773	174.73	6.86
gmina Piwniczna-Zdrój	urban-rural	Nowy Sącz	Lesser Poland	126.46	10,556	83.47	-3.82
gmina Podegrodzie	rural	Nowy Sącz	Lesser Poland	64.73	13,331	205.95	8.73
gmina Rytro	rural	Nowy Sącz	Lesser Poland	41.9	3,763	89.81	-4.48
gmina Stary Sącz	urban-rural	Nowy Sącz	Lesser Poland	100.88	23,782	235.75	2.93
Nowy Targ	urban	Nowy Targ	Lesser Poland	51.07	33,324	652.52	-1.19
gmina Szczawnica	urban-rural	Nowy Targ	Lesser Poland	87.9	7,174	81.62	-6.51
gmina Czarny Dunajec	rural	Nowy Targ	Lesser Poland	217.35	22,647	104.2	4.07
gmina Czorsztyn	rural	Nowy Targ	Lesser Poland	62.16	7,676	123.49	2.44
gmina Jabłonka	rural	Nowy Targ	Lesser Poland	212.73	18,694	87.88	3.77
gmina Krościenko nad Dunajcem	rural	Nowy Targ	Lesser Poland	57.12	6,780	118.7	-0.74
gmina Lipnica Wielka	rural	Nowy Targ	Lesser Poland	67.36	6,024	89.43	3.23
gmina Łapsze Niżne	rural	Nowy Targ	Lesser Poland	125.79	9,386	74.62	2.39
gmina Nowy Targ	rural	Nowy Targ	Lesser Poland	207.68	24,091	116	3.68
gmina Ochotnica Dolna	rural	Nowy Targ	Lesser Poland	141.2	8,513	60.29	0.51
gmina Raba Wyżna	rural	Nowy Targ	Lesser Poland	89.02	14,784	166.08	3.63
gmina Rabka-Zdrój	urban-rural	Nowy Targ	Lesser Poland	69.16	17,049	246.52	-3.44
gmina Spytkowice	rural	Nowy Targ	Lesser Poland	32.18	4,618	143.51	7.55
gmina Szaflary	rural	Nowy Targ	Lesser Poland	54.27	11,122	204.94	3.87
Bukowno	urban	Olkusz	Lesser Poland	64.59	10,034	155.35	-8.97
gmina Bolesław	rural	Olkusz	Lesser Poland	40.71	7,765	190.74	0.09
gmina Klucze	rural	Olkusz	Lesser Poland	119.5	14,931	124.95	-3.96
gmina Olkusz	urban-rural	Olkusz	Lesser Poland	150.8	48,451	321.29	-6.39
gmina Trzyciąż	rural	Olkusz	Lesser Poland	95.73	7,049	73.63	-0.09
gmina Wolbrom	urban-rural	Olkusz	Lesser Poland	146.78	22,670	154.45	-5.47
Oświęcim	urban	Oświęcim	Lesser Poland	30	37,826	1260.87	-8.01
gmina Brzeszcze	urban-rural	Oświęcim	Lesser Poland	45.6	21,146	463.73	-4.28
gmina Chełmek	urban-rural	Oświęcim	Lesser Poland	27.32	12,908	472.47	-3.08
gmina Kęty	urban-rural	Oświęcim	Lesser Poland	76.08	34,100	448.21	-2.42
gmina Osiek	rural	Oświęcim	Lesser Poland	40.76	8,252	202.45	1.91
gmina Oświęcim	rural	Oświęcim	Lesser Poland	74.84	18,572	248.16	5.57
gmina Polanka Wielka	rural	Oświęcim	Lesser Poland	23.89	4,306	180.24	-0.31
gmina Przeciszów	rural	Oświęcim	Lesser Poland	35.46	6,729	189.76	0.5
gmina Zator	urban-rural	Oświęcim	Lesser Poland	51.63	9,286	179.86	-1.04
gmina Koniusza	rural	Proszowice	Lesser Poland	88.52	9,023	101.93	0.85
gmina Koszyce	urban-rural	Proszowice	Lesser Poland	66.06	5,439	82.33	-5.93
gmina Nowe Brzesko	urban-rural	Proszowice	Lesser Poland	54.42	5,693	104.61	-1.81
gmina Pałecznica	rural	Proszowice	Lesser Poland	47.88	3,563	74.42	-7.37
gmina Proszowice	urban-rural	Proszowice	Lesser Poland	100.02	16,115	161.12	-3
gmina Radziemice	rural	Proszowice	Lesser Poland	57.97	3,327	57.39	-10.11
Jordanów	urban	Sucha	Lesser Poland	21.03	5,378	255.73	0.43
Sucha Beskidzka	urban	Sucha	Lesser Poland	27.65	9,042	327.02	-11.88
gmina Budzów	rural	Sucha	Lesser Poland	73.56	8,954	121.72	1.94
gmina Bystra-Sidzina	rural	Sucha	Lesser Poland	80.52	6,911	85.83	3.59
gmina Jordanów	rural	Sucha	Lesser Poland	92.45	11,235	121.53	4.94
gmina Maków Podhalański	urban-rural	Sucha	Lesser Poland	108.71	16,042	147.57	-3.47
gmina Stryszawa	rural	Sucha	Lesser Poland	113.81	11,953	105.03	3.77
gmina Zawoja	rural	Sucha	Lesser Poland	128.78	9,062	70.37	-1.58
gmina Zembrzyce	rural	Sucha	Lesser Poland	39.2	5,620	143.37	0.3
gmina Ciężkowice	urban-rural	Tarnów	Lesser Poland	103.38	11,205	108.39	-1.07
gmina Gromnik	rural	Tarnów	Lesser Poland	69.73	8,947	128.31	3.38
gmina Lisia Góra	rural	Tarnów	Lesser Poland	104.32	15,430	147.91	6.63
gmina Pleśna	rural	Tarnów	Lesser Poland	83.06	11,954	143.92	-0.22
gmina Radłów	urban-rural	Tarnów	Lesser Poland	86.19	9,659	112.07	-2.95
gmina Ryglice	urban-rural	Tarnów	Lesser Poland	117.11	11,631	99.32	-1.43
gmina Rzepiennik Strzyżewski	rural	Tarnów	Lesser Poland	70.71	6,748	95.43	-0.64
gmina Skrzyszów	rural	Tarnów	Lesser Poland	86.02	14,297	166.21	3.5
gmina Tarnów	rural	Tarnów	Lesser Poland	82.72	26,238	317.19	5.42
gmina Tuchów	urban-rural	Tarnów	Lesser Poland	99.86	17,891	179.16	-3.4
gmina Wierzchosławice	rural	Tarnów	Lesser Poland	75.15	10,842	144.27	1.98
gmina Wietrzychowice	rural	Tarnów	Lesser Poland	48.4	3,942	81.45	-3.69
gmina Wojnicz	urban-rural	Tarnów	Lesser Poland	79.31	13,397	168.92	-0.82
gmina Zakliczyn	urban-rural	Tarnów	Lesser Poland	122.06	12,492	102.34	1.82
gmina Żabno	urban-rural	Tarnów	Lesser Poland	101.56	18,846	185.57	-2.99
gmina Szerzyny	rural	Tarnów	Lesser Poland	82	7,935	96.77	0.84
Zakopane	urban	Tatra	Lesser Poland	84.26	26,942	319.75	-4
gmina Biały Dunajec	rural	Tatra	Lesser Poland	35.23	7,177	203.72	1.91
gmina Bukowina Tatrzańska	rural	Tatra	Lesser Poland	131.86	13,448	101.99	4.48
gmina Kościelisko	rural	Tatra	Lesser Poland	136.68	8,876	64.94	5.97
gmina Poronin	rural	Tatra	Lesser Poland	83.62	11,677	139.64	3.59
gmina Andrychów	urban-rural	Wadowice	Lesser Poland	100.39	43,389	432.2	-3.26
gmina Brzeźnica	rural	Wadowice	Lesser Poland	66.43	10,467	157.56	7.73
gmina Kalwaria Zebrzydowska	urban-rural	Wadowice	Lesser Poland	75.26	20,046	266.36	0.77
gmina Lanckorona	rural	Wadowice	Lesser Poland	40.43	6,227	154.02	1.4
gmina Mucharz	rural	Wadowice	Lesser Poland	37.31	4,128	110.64	4.89
gmina Spytkowice	rural	Wadowice	Lesser Poland	51.38	10,375	201.93	2.97
gmina Stryszów	rural	Wadowice	Lesser Poland	45.9	6,842	149.06	-1.12
gmina Tomice	rural	Wadowice	Lesser Poland	41.53	8,205	197.57	6.92
gmina Wadowice	urban-rural	Wadowice	Lesser Poland	112.83	37,821	335.2	-1.15
gmina Wieprz	rural	Wadowice	Lesser Poland	74.42	12,471	167.58	5.08
gmina Biskupice	rural	Wieliczka	Lesser Poland	41.14	10,522	255.76	14.68
gmina Gdów	rural	Wieliczka	Lesser Poland	108.72	18,357	168.85	8.19
gmina Kłaj	rural	Wieliczka	Lesser Poland	64.98	10,814	166.42	5.55
gmina Niepołomice	urban-rural	Wieliczka	Lesser Poland	96.27	29,386	305.25	21.69
gmina Wieliczka	urban-rural	Wieliczka	Lesser Poland	99.67	60,905	611.07	16.7
**Kraków**	urban	city with county rights	Lesser Poland	326.85	780,981	2389.42	6.15
**Nowy Sącz**	urban	city with county rights	Lesser Poland	57.58	83,762	1454.71	-0.74
**Tarnów**	urban	city with county rights	Lesser Poland	72.38	108,177	1494.57	-5.08
gmina Białobrzegi	urban-rural	Białobrzegi	Mazovian	77.74	10,237	131.68	-3.52
gmina Promna	rural	Białobrzegi	Mazovian	120.26	5,528	45.97	-2.88
gmina Radzanów	rural	Białobrzegi	Mazovian	82.52	3,888	47.12	-0.09
gmina Stara Błotnica	rural	Białobrzegi	Mazovian	96.05	5,302	55.2	1.51
gmina Stromiec	rural	Białobrzegi	Mazovian	156.74	5,613	35.81	-1.6
gmina Wyśmierzyce	urban-rural	Białobrzegi	Mazovian	105.79	2,764	26.13	-5.6
Ciechanów	urban	Ciechanów	Mazovian	32.78	44,044	1343.62	-2.19
gmina Ciechanów	rural	Ciechanów	Mazovian	140.54	7,150	50.88	5.23
gmina Glinojeck	urban-rural	Ciechanów	Mazovian	153.85	7,789	50.63	-9.61
gmina Gołymin-Ośrodek	rural	Ciechanów	Mazovian	110.71	3,726	33.66	-13.32
gmina Grudusk	rural	Ciechanów	Mazovian	96.75	3,560	36.8	-9.64
gmina Ojrzeń	rural	Ciechanów	Mazovian	120.24	4,296	35.73	-1.39
gmina Opinogóra Górna	rural	Ciechanów	Mazovian	139.04	5,941	42.73	-3.51
gmina Regimin	rural	Ciechanów	Mazovian	111.18	4,980	44.79	-3.59
gmina Sońsk	rural	Ciechanów	Mazovian	154.71	7,727	49.95	-4.79
Garwolin	urban	Garwolin	Mazovian	22.08	17,639	798.87	4.94
Łaskarzew	urban	Garwolin	Mazovian	15.35	4,835	314.98	-3.02
gmina Borowie	rural	Garwolin	Mazovian	80.22	5,276	65.77	2.86
gmina Garwolin	rural	Garwolin	Mazovian	135.76	13,288	97.88	3.49
gmina Górzno	rural	Garwolin	Mazovian	91.2	6,558	71.91	4.77
gmina Łaskarzew	rural	Garwolin	Mazovian	87.62	5,472	62.45	-1.76
gmina Maciejowice	rural	Garwolin	Mazovian	174.04	6,880	39.53	-5.75
gmina Miastków Kościelny	rural	Garwolin	Mazovian	85.28	4,862	57.01	-0.48
gmina Parysów	rural	Garwolin	Mazovian	64.15	4,142	64.57	5.78
gmina Pilawa	urban-rural	Garwolin	Mazovian	77.1	10,983	142.45	1.03
gmina Sobolew	rural	Garwolin	Mazovian	94.8	8,203	86.53	-2.31
gmina Trojanów	rural	Garwolin	Mazovian	151.34	7,278	48.09	-6.33
gmina Wilga	rural	Garwolin	Mazovian	118.4	5,259	44.42	-6.26
gmina Żelechów	urban-rural	Garwolin	Mazovian	87.49	8,265	94.47	-5.19
Gostynin	urban	Gostynin	Mazovian	32.4	18,441	569.17	-3.96
gmina Gostynin	rural	Gostynin	Mazovian	270.37	11,990	44.35	-4.71
gmina Pacyna	rural	Gostynin	Mazovian	90.29	3,505	38.82	-12.16
gmina Sanniki	urban-rural	Gostynin	Mazovian	94.59	5,991	63.34	-8.05
gmina Szczawin Kościelny	rural	Gostynin	Mazovian	127.16	4,834	38.02	-5.46
Milanówek	urban	Grodzisk	Mazovian	13.44	16,464	1225	2.79
Podkowa Leśna	urban	Grodzisk	Mazovian	10.13	3,839	378.97	-2.16
gmina Baranów	rural	Grodzisk	Mazovian	75.34	5,363	71.18	6.42
gmina Grodzisk Mazowiecki	urban-rural	Grodzisk	Mazovian	107.4	49,416	460.11	22.66
gmina Jaktorów	rural	Grodzisk	Mazovian	55.3	12,519	226.38	12.47
gmina Żabia Wola	rural	Grodzisk	Mazovian	105.43	9,097	86.28	24.53
gmina Belsk Duży	rural	Grójec	Mazovian	107.51	6,451	60	-4.51
gmina Błędów	rural	Grójec	Mazovian	134.05	7,386	55.1	-8.04
gmina Chynów	rural	Grójec	Mazovian	134.99	9,852	72.98	0.61
gmina Goszczyn	rural	Grójec	Mazovian	57.5	2,967	51.6	-2.13
gmina Grójec	urban-rural	Grójec	Mazovian	121.35	25,865	213.14	3.24
gmina Jasieniec	rural	Grójec	Mazovian	108.24	5,371	49.62	0
gmina Mogielnica	urban-rural	Grójec	Mazovian	140.99	8,615	61.1	-5.7
gmina Nowe Miasto nad Pilicą	urban-rural	Grójec	Mazovian	158.51	7,636	48.17	-9.84
gmina Pniewy	rural	Grójec	Mazovian	102.32	4,803	46.94	3.49
gmina Warka	urban-rural	Grójec	Mazovian	202.27	19,227	95.06	-0.47
gmina Garbatka-Letnisko	rural	Kozienice	Mazovian	73.83	5,002	67.75	-7.29
gmina Głowaczów	rural	Kozienice	Mazovian	185.84	7,120	38.31	-6.42
gmina Gniewoszów	rural	Kozienice	Mazovian	84.1	3,854	45.83	-6.49
gmina Grabów nad Pilicą	rural	Kozienice	Mazovian	124.72	3,911	31.36	0.85
gmina Kozienice	urban-rural	Kozienice	Mazovian	244.03	29,296	120.05	-6.76
gmina Magnuszew	rural	Kozienice	Mazovian	141.06	6,727	47.69	-3.25
gmina Sieciechów	rural	Kozienice	Mazovian	62.52	3,883	62.11	-8.36
Legionowo	urban	Legionowo	Mazovian	13.54	53,809	3974.08	-2.02
gmina Jabłonna	rural	Legionowo	Mazovian	64.8	19,843	306.22	18.94
gmina Nieporęt	rural	Legionowo	Mazovian	96.04	14,748	153.56	10.05
gmina Serock	urban-rural	Legionowo	Mazovian	110.29	15,278	138.53	19.83
gmina Wieliszew	rural	Legionowo	Mazovian	106.09	15,628	147.31	53.1
gmina Chotcza	rural	Lipsko	Mazovian	89.82	2,320	25.83	-3.85
gmina Ciepielów	rural	Lipsko	Mazovian	134.77	5,505	40.85	-8.75
gmina Lipsko	urban-rural	Lipsko	Mazovian	135.25	10,919	80.73	-9.7
gmina Rzeczniów	rural	Lipsko	Mazovian	103.43	4,331	41.87	-10.18
gmina Sienno	rural	Lipsko	Mazovian	147.12	5,791	39.36	-8.04
gmina Solec nad Wisłą	urban-rural	Lipsko	Mazovian	129.83	4,872	37.53	-10.58
gmina Huszlew	rural	Łosice	Mazovian	117.71	2,803	23.81	-6.69
gmina Łosice	urban-rural	Łosice	Mazovian	121.29	10,751	88.64	-4.79
gmina Olszanka	rural	Łosice	Mazovian	87.63	2,929	33.42	-11.02
gmina Platerów	rural	Łosice	Mazovian	129.49	4,831	37.31	-8.15
gmina Sarnaki	rural	Łosice	Mazovian	197.49	4,628	23.43	-15.5
gmina Stara Kornica	rural	Łosice	Mazovian	118.84	4,716	39.68	-9.91
Maków Mazowiecki	urban	Maków	Mazovian	10.28	9,651	938.81	-7.35
gmina Czerwonka	rural	Maków	Mazovian	110.44	2,638	23.89	-4.14
gmina Karniewo	rural	Maków	Mazovian	129.06	5,145	39.87	-4.88
gmina Krasnosielc	rural	Maków	Mazovian	167.15	6,329	37.86	-6.81
gmina Młynarze	rural	Maków	Mazovian	74.86	1,732	23.14	-5.33
gmina Płoniawy-Bramura	rural	Maków	Mazovian	134.85	5,292	39.24	-14.79
gmina Różan	urban-rural	Maków	Mazovian	84.58	4,414	52.19	-1.28
gmina Rzewnie	rural	Maków	Mazovian	111.75	2,605	23.31	-8.8
gmina Sypniewo	rural	Maków	Mazovian	128.45	3,229	25.14	-11.99
gmina Szelków	rural	Maków	Mazovian	113.21	3,632	32.08	-5.98
Mińsk Mazowiecki	urban	Mińsk	Mazovian	13.18	40,995	3110.39	4.67
gmina Cegłów	rural	Mińsk	Mazovian	95.63	6,083	63.61	-4.88
gmina Dębe Wielkie	rural	Mińsk	Mazovian	77.72	10,610	136.52	16.93
gmina Dobre	rural	Mińsk	Mazovian	124.9	5,995	48	-1.16
gmina Halinów	urban-rural	Mińsk	Mazovian	63.09	16,417	260.22	12.47
gmina Jakubów	rural	Mińsk	Mazovian	86.98	5,111	58.76	3.15
gmina Kałuszyn	urban-rural	Mińsk	Mazovian	94.39	5,805	61.5	-4.55
gmina Latowicz	rural	Mińsk	Mazovian	114.05	5,389	47.25	-3.74
gmina Mińsk Mazowiecki	rural	Mińsk	Mazovian	112.31	15,563	138.57	8.58
gmina Mrozy	urban-rural	Mińsk	Mazovian	144.92	8,713	60.12	1.27
gmina Siennica	rural	Mińsk	Mazovian	110.87	7,506	67.7	2.28
gmina Stanisławów	rural	Mińsk	Mazovian	106.37	6,795	63.88	2.76
Sulejówek	urban	Mińsk	Mazovian	19.31	19,960	1033.66	6.68
Mława	urban	Mława	Mazovian	34.8	31,227	897.33	0.92
gmina Dzierzgowo	rural	Mława	Mazovian	150.61	3,049	20.24	-13.72
gmina Lipowiec Kościelny	rural	Mława	Mazovian	114.45	4,764	41.63	-6.76
gmina Radzanów	rural	Mława	Mazovian	98.86	3,243	32.8	-14.67
gmina Strzegowo	rural	Mława	Mazovian	214.21	7,444	34.75	-8.06
gmina Stupsk	rural	Mława	Mazovian	117.99	4,830	40.94	-6.27
gmina Szreńsk	rural	Mława	Mazovian	109.39	4,096	37.44	-11.3
gmina Szydłowo	rural	Mława	Mazovian	122.5	4,557	37.2	-6.07
gmina Wieczfnia Kościelna	rural	Mława	Mazovian	119.73	4,031	33.67	-8.69
gmina Wiśniewo	rural	Mława	Mazovian	99.28	5,207	52.45	-10.9
Nowy Dwór Mazowiecki	urban	Nowy Dwór	Mazovian	28.21	28,718	1018.01	1.37
gmina Czosnów	rural	Nowy Dwór	Mazovian	128.45	10,003	77.87	4.91
gmina Leoncin	rural	Nowy Dwór	Mazovian	157.98	5,618	35.56	4.31
gmina Nasielsk	urban-rural	Nowy Dwór	Mazovian	205.77	19,997	97.18	1.05
gmina Pomiechówek	rural	Nowy Dwór	Mazovian	102.68	9,092	88.55	1.14
gmina Zakroczym	urban-rural	Nowy Dwór	Mazovian	71.7	5,999	83.67	-6.58
gmina Baranowo	rural	Ostrołęka	Mazovian	197.57	6,470	32.75	-8.11
gmina Czarnia	rural	Ostrołęka	Mazovian	93.85	2,508	26.72	-14.46
gmina Czerwin	rural	Ostrołęka	Mazovian	170.24	5,083	29.86	-1.63
gmina Goworowo	rural	Ostrołęka	Mazovian	219.1	8,265	37.72	-7.04
gmina Kadzidło	rural	Ostrołęka	Mazovian	258.88	11,330	43.77	-3.59
gmina Lelis	rural	Ostrołęka	Mazovian	196.39	9,745	49.62	7.53
gmina Łyse	rural	Ostrołęka	Mazovian	246.78	8,373	33.93	-2.81
gmina Myszyniec	urban-rural	Ostrołęka	Mazovian	226.81	10,414	45.92	-3.53
gmina Olszewo-Borki	rural	Ostrołęka	Mazovian	196.74	10,785	54.82	8.49
gmina Rzekuń	rural	Ostrołęka	Mazovian	130.89	10,897	83.25	5.44
gmina Troszyn	rural	Ostrołęka	Mazovian	156.3	4,754	30.42	-7.39
Ostrów Mazowiecka	urban	Ostrów	Mazovian	22.27	22,332	1002.78	-5.14
gmina Andrzejewo	rural	Ostrów	Mazovian	118.74	4,035	33.98	-11.86
gmina Boguty-Pianki	rural	Ostrów	Mazovian	89.09	2,577	28.93	-9.39
gmina Brok	urban-rural	Ostrów	Mazovian	109.91	2,804	25.51	-7.15
gmina Małkinia Górna	rural	Ostrów	Mazovian	134.31	11,591	86.3	-5.12
gmina Nur	rural	Ostrów	Mazovian	96	2,651	27.61	-15.6
gmina Ostrów Mazowiecka	rural	Ostrów	Mazovian	282.94	12,886	45.54	-1.19
gmina Stary Lubotyń	rural	Ostrów	Mazovian	109.59	3,695	33.72	-4.03
gmina Szulborze Wielkie	rural	Ostrów	Mazovian	46.72	1,637	35.04	-13.28
gmina Wąsewo	rural	Ostrów	Mazovian	119.49	4,264	35.68	-8.91
gmina Zaręby Kościelne	rural	Ostrów	Mazovian	88.73	3,619	40.79	-10.55
Józefów	urban	Otwock	Mazovian	23.91	20,744	867.59	5.05
Otwock	urban	Otwock	Mazovian	47.31	44,560	941.87	-2.43
gmina Celestynów	rural	Otwock	Mazovian	88.92	11,738	132.01	1.57
gmina Karczew	urban-rural	Otwock	Mazovian	81.5	15,903	195.13	-0.17
gmina Kołbiel	rural	Otwock	Mazovian	106.5	8,224	77.22	1.87
gmina Osieck	rural	Otwock	Mazovian	67.98	3,653	53.74	6.75
gmina Sobienie-Jeziory	rural	Otwock	Mazovian	97.68	6,396	65.48	0.68
gmina Wiązowna	rural	Otwock	Mazovian	102.12	13,242	129.67	18.46
gmina Góra Kalwaria	urban-rural	Piaseczno	Mazovian	144.12	27,154	188.41	8.9
gmina Konstancin-Jeziorna	urban-rural	Piaseczno	Mazovian	78.58	24,697	314.29	-0.58
gmina Lesznowola	rural	Piaseczno	Mazovian	69.3	29,083	419.67	44.47
gmina Piaseczno	urban-rural	Piaseczno	Mazovian	128.26	85,730	668.41	15.41
gmina Prażmów	rural	Piaseczno	Mazovian	86.47	11,285	130.51	17.78
gmina Tarczyn	urban-rural	Piaseczno	Mazovian	114.27	11,567	101.23	4.95
gmina Bielsk	rural	Płock	Mazovian	125.17	9,065	72.42	-1.8
gmina Bodzanów	rural	Płock	Mazovian	136.35	8,174	59.95	-2.84
gmina Brudzeń Duży	rural	Płock	Mazovian	159.84	8,267	51.72	0.57
gmina Bulkowo	rural	Płock	Mazovian	116.93	5,495	46.99	-12.02
gmina Drobin	urban-rural	Płock	Mazovian	143.5	7,875	54.88	-9.22
gmina Gąbin	urban-rural	Płock	Mazovian	146.21	11,002	75.25	-1.3
gmina Łąck	rural	Płock	Mazovian	93.99	5,407	57.53	1.17
gmina Mała Wieś	rural	Płock	Mazovian	108.78	5,937	54.58	-9.64
gmina Nowy Duninów	rural	Płock	Mazovian	146.23	3,980	27.22	0.42
gmina Radzanowo	rural	Płock	Mazovian	104.45	8,523	81.6	5.34
gmina Słubice	rural	Płock	Mazovian	95.82	4,418	46.11	-5.45
gmina Słupno	rural	Płock	Mazovian	74.93	8,068	107.67	23.27
gmina Stara Biała	rural	Płock	Mazovian	111.12	11,983	107.84	5.65
gmina Staroźreby	rural	Płock	Mazovian	137.66	7,181	52.16	-9.92
gmina Wyszogród	urban-rural	Płock	Mazovian	95.65	5,552	58.04	-4.99
Płońsk	urban	Płońsk	Mazovian	11.6	22,053	1901.12	-3.11
Raciąż	urban	Płońsk	Mazovian	8.4	4,390	522.62	-6
gmina Baboszewo	rural	Płońsk	Mazovian	162.23	7,954	49.03	-3.12
gmina Czerwińsk nad Wisłą	urban-rural	Płońsk	Mazovian	144.11	7,626	52.92	-5.49
gmina Dzierzążnia	rural	Płońsk	Mazovian	102.48	3,606	35.19	-9.52
gmina Joniec	rural	Płońsk	Mazovian	73.15	2,674	36.56	4.27
gmina Naruszewo	rural	Płońsk	Mazovian	159.5	6,295	39.47	-5.19
gmina Nowe Miasto	rural	Płońsk	Mazovian	117.85	4,633	39.31	-4.42
gmina Płońsk	rural	Płońsk	Mazovian	126.91	7,942	62.58	6.07
gmina Raciąż	rural	Płońsk	Mazovian	242.89	8,263	34.02	-8.6
gmina Sochocin	urban-rural	Płońsk	Mazovian	122.19	5,781	47.31	-5.02
gmina Załuski	rural	Płońsk	Mazovian	108.48	5,651	52.09	-2.41
Piastów	urban	Pruszków	Mazovian	5.76	22,617	3926.56	-1.59
Pruszków	urban	Pruszków	Mazovian	19.19	62,489	3256.33	8.11
gmina Brwinów	urban-rural	Pruszków	Mazovian	69.26	26,819	387.22	11.59
gmina Michałowice	rural	Pruszków	Mazovian	34.73	18,405	529.95	12.11
gmina Nadarzyn	rural	Pruszków	Mazovian	73.45	14,215	193.53	24.48
gmina Raszyn	rural	Pruszków	Mazovian	43.91	21,891	498.54	5.12
Przasnysz	urban	Przasnysz	Mazovian	25.16	17,160	682.03	-1.92
gmina Chorzele	urban-rural	Przasnysz	Mazovian	370.69	10,125	27.31	-2.88
gmina Czernice Borowe	rural	Przasnysz	Mazovian	120.18	3,779	31.44	-5.93
gmina Jednorożec	rural	Przasnysz	Mazovian	232.24	7,051	30.36	-4.78
gmina Krasne	rural	Przasnysz	Mazovian	101.35	3,593	35.45	-6.32
gmina Krzynowłoga Mała	rural	Przasnysz	Mazovian	184.87	3,427	18.54	-7.57
gmina Przasnysz	rural	Przasnysz	Mazovian	184.13	7,220	39.21	-3.07
gmina Borkowice	rural	Przysucha	Mazovian	85.8	4,258	49.63	-2.57
gmina Gielniów	rural	Przysucha	Mazovian	79.22	4,524	57.11	-8.4
gmina Klwów	rural	Przysucha	Mazovian	86.75	3,366	38.8	-7.7
gmina Odrzywół	rural	Przysucha	Mazovian	99.13	3,723	37.56	-17.12
gmina Potworów	rural	Przysucha	Mazovian	81.7	4,193	51.32	-5.74
gmina Przysucha	urban-rural	Przysucha	Mazovian	181.86	11,754	64.63	-8.91
gmina Rusinów	rural	Przysucha	Mazovian	82.76	4,270	51.59	-3.87
gmina Wieniawa	rural	Przysucha	Mazovian	103.97	5,272	50.71	-6.18
gmina Gzy	rural	Pułtusk	Mazovian	104.46	3,737	35.77	-11.33
gmina Obryte	rural	Pułtusk	Mazovian	139.76	4,785	34.24	-2.77
gmina Pokrzywnica	rural	Pułtusk	Mazovian	120.54	5,018	41.63	2.81
gmina Pułtusk	urban-rural	Pułtusk	Mazovian	134.13	24,685	184.04	1.75
gmina Świercze	rural	Pułtusk	Mazovian	93.37	4,631	49.6	0.43
gmina Winnica	rural	Pułtusk	Mazovian	115.04	4,113	35.75	2.12
gmina Zatory	rural	Pułtusk	Mazovian	120.12	4,848	40.36	0.55
Pionki	urban	Radom	Mazovian	18.4	18,047	980.82	-11.07
gmina Gózd	rural	Radom	Mazovian	77.95	9,036	115.92	10.86
gmina Iłża	urban-rural	Radom	Mazovian	256.02	14,610	57.07	-6.82
gmina Jastrzębia	rural	Radom	Mazovian	89.76	7,017	78.18	2.58
gmina Jedlińsk	rural	Radom	Mazovian	138.72	14,552	104.9	4.81
gmina Jedlnia-Letnisko	rural	Radom	Mazovian	65.58	12,864	196.16	6.8
gmina Kowala	rural	Radom	Mazovian	74.68	12,242	163.93	4.37
gmina Pionki	rural	Radom	Mazovian	229.73	9,973	43.41	-2.3
gmina Przytyk	rural	Radom	Mazovian	134.37	7,300	54.33	-0.23
gmina Skaryszew	urban-rural	Radom	Mazovian	171.27	14,797	86.4	4.8
gmina Wierzbica	rural	Radom	Mazovian	94.1	9,638	102.42	-6.79
gmina Wolanów	rural	Radom	Mazovian	82.9	8,909	107.47	3.54
gmina Zakrzew	rural	Radom	Mazovian	96.3	13,252	137.61	10.14
gmina Domanice	rural	Siedlce	Mazovian	46.97	2,628	55.95	-2.02
gmina Korczew	rural	Siedlce	Mazovian	104.95	2,590	24.68	-11.94
gmina Kotuń	rural	Siedlce	Mazovian	150.47	8,474	56.32	-4.21
gmina Mokobody	rural	Siedlce	Mazovian	119.31	4,933	41.35	-7
gmina Mordy	urban-rural	Siedlce	Mazovian	170.02	5,744	33.78	-10.46
gmina Paprotnia	rural	Siedlce	Mazovian	81.43	2,545	31.25	-5.95
gmina Przesmyki	rural	Siedlce	Mazovian	117.25	3,156	26.92	-10.14
gmina Siedlce	rural	Siedlce	Mazovian	141.35	18,501	130.89	7.7
gmina Skórzec	rural	Siedlce	Mazovian	119.04	7,900	66.36	7.23
gmina Suchożebry	rural	Siedlce	Mazovian	100.54	4,677	46.52	-2.76
gmina Wiśniew	rural	Siedlce	Mazovian	126	5,764	45.75	-1.27
gmina Wodynie	rural	Siedlce	Mazovian	115.4	4,378	37.94	-5.12
gmina Zbuczyn	rural	Siedlce	Mazovian	210.75	10,112	47.98	0.23
Sierpc	urban	Sierpc	Mazovian	18.59	17,870	961.27	-5.21
gmina Gozdowo	rural	Sierpc	Mazovian	126.35	5,947	47.07	-2.34
gmina Mochowo	rural	Sierpc	Mazovian	143.71	5,962	41.49	-7.54
gmina Rościszewo	rural	Sierpc	Mazovian	114.79	4,111	35.81	-5.69
gmina Sierpc	rural	Sierpc	Mazovian	150.09	7,002	46.65	-5.32
gmina Szczutowo	rural	Sierpc	Mazovian	112.68	4,302	38.18	2.02
gmina Zawidz	rural	Sierpc	Mazovian	185.83	6,550	35.25	-10.27
Sochaczew	urban	Sochaczew	Mazovian	26.19	36,138	1379.84	-6.71
gmina Brochów	rural	Sochaczew	Mazovian	119.81	4,378	36.54	3.53
gmina Iłów	rural	Sochaczew	Mazovian	129.07	6,123	47.44	-3.19
gmina Młodzieszyn	rural	Sochaczew	Mazovian	117.49	5,584	47.53	-0.48
gmina Nowa Sucha	rural	Sochaczew	Mazovian	90.15	6,679	74.09	4.74
gmina Rybno	rural	Sochaczew	Mazovian	72.75	3,481	47.85	0.1
gmina Sochaczew	rural	Sochaczew	Mazovian	91.38	11,032	120.73	11.03
gmina Teresin	rural	Sochaczew	Mazovian	87.96	11,586	131.72	4.5
Sokołów Podlaski	urban	Sokołów	Mazovian	17.51	18,912	1080.07	0.92
gmina Bielany	rural	Sokołów	Mazovian	110.07	3,578	32.51	-8.25
gmina Ceranów	rural	Sokołów	Mazovian	111.05	2,146	19.32	-17.54
gmina Jabłonna Lacka	rural	Sokołów	Mazovian	149.27	4,406	29.52	-13.11
gmina Kosów Lacki	urban-rural	Sokołów	Mazovian	200.13	5,927	29.62	-10.95
gmina Repki	rural	Sokołów	Mazovian	168.58	5,140	30.49	-12.71
gmina Sabnie	rural	Sokołów	Mazovian	107.98	3,618	33.51	-9.85
gmina Sokołów Podlaski	rural	Sokołów	Mazovian	136.61	6,022	44.08	0.11
gmina Sterdyń	rural	Sokołów	Mazovian	129.97	3,868	29.76	-14.56
gmina Chlewiska	rural	Szydłowiec	Mazovian	123.98	5,901	47.6	-5.36
gmina Jastrząb	rural	Szydłowiec	Mazovian	54.53	5,178	94.96	-2.88
gmina Mirów	rural	Szydłowiec	Mazovian	53.05	3,892	73.36	0.77
gmina Orońsko	rural	Szydłowiec	Mazovian	81.95	5,959	72.72	0.62
gmina Szydłowiec	urban-rural	Szydłowiec	Mazovian	138.3	18,617	134.61	-5.28
gmina Błonie	urban-rural	Warsaw West	Mazovian	85.58	21,602	252.42	2.78
gmina Izabelin	rural	Warsaw West	Mazovian	65.01	10,591	162.91	1.23
gmina Kampinos	rural	Warsaw West	Mazovian	84.6	4,353	51.45	4.64
gmina Leszno	rural	Warsaw West	Mazovian	125.08	10,209	81.62	4.61
gmina Łomianki	urban-rural	Warsaw West	Mazovian	38.83	27,432	706.46	16.81
gmina Ożarów Mazowiecki	urban-rural	Warsaw West	Mazovian	71.27	25,840	362.56	27.72
gmina Stare Babice	rural	Warsaw West	Mazovian	63.42	19,476	307.1	17.71
Węgrów	urban	Węgrów	Mazovian	35.51	12,526	352.75	-6.44
gmina Grębków	rural	Węgrów	Mazovian	130.76	4,447	34.01	-0.6
gmina Korytnica	rural	Węgrów	Mazovian	180.32	6,189	34.32	-6.54
gmina Liw	rural	Węgrów	Mazovian	169.47	7,330	43.25	-7.48
gmina Łochów	urban-rural	Węgrów	Mazovian	196.22	17,862	91.03	-0.76
gmina Miedzna	rural	Węgrów	Mazovian	116.01	3,806	32.81	-10.21
gmina Sadowne	rural	Węgrów	Mazovian	144.73	5,810	40.14	-3.93
gmina Stoczek	rural	Węgrów	Mazovian	144.54	4,952	34.26	-4.73
gmina Wierzbno	rural	Węgrów	Mazovian	103.2	2,719	26.35	-11.73
Kobyłka	urban	Wołomin	Mazovian	19.64	24,883	1266.96	29.92
Marki	urban	Wołomin	Mazovian	26.15	36,215	1384.89	40.53
Ząbki	urban	Wołomin	Mazovian	10.98	38,302	3488.34	27.23
Zielonka	urban	Wołomin	Mazovian	79.48	17,526	220.51	-0.04
gmina Dąbrówka	rural	Wołomin	Mazovian	109.22	8,173	74.83	5.53
gmina Jadów	rural	Wołomin	Mazovian	116.58	7,456	63.96	-5.53
gmina Klembów	rural	Wołomin	Mazovian	85.7	10,052	117.29	9.74
gmina Poświętne	rural	Wołomin	Mazovian	103.95	6,247	60.1	2.79
gmina Radzymin	urban-rural	Wołomin	Mazovian	129.46	27,741	214.28	17.98
gmina Strachówka	rural	Wołomin	Mazovian	107.73	2,726	25.3	-3.88
gmina Tłuszcz	urban-rural	Wołomin	Mazovian	103.01	20,101	195.14	3.42
gmina Wołomin	urban-rural	Wołomin	Mazovian	61.66	51,854	840.97	0.26
gmina Brańszczyk	rural	Wyszków	Mazovian	166.51	8,201	49.25	-4.47
gmina Długosiodło	rural	Wyszków	Mazovian	167.62	7,765	46.33	-4.05
gmina Rząśnik	rural	Wyszków	Mazovian	167.43	7,004	41.83	0.19
gmina Somianka	rural	Wyszków	Mazovian	117.69	5,603	47.61	1.61
gmina Wyszków	urban-rural	Wyszków	Mazovian	165.18	39,728	240.51	2.86
gmina Zabrodzie	rural	Wyszków	Mazovian	92	5,982	65.02	5.41
gmina Kazanów	rural	Zwoleń	Mazovian	94.92	4,502	47.43	-5.85
gmina Policzna	rural	Zwoleń	Mazovian	112.52	5,441	48.36	-10.61
gmina Przyłęk	rural	Zwoleń	Mazovian	131.57	6,136	46.64	-5.91
gmina Tczów	rural	Zwoleń	Mazovian	72.15	4,901	67.93	-0.95
gmina Zwoleń	urban-rural	Zwoleń	Mazovian	162.14	15,046	92.8	-5.28
gmina Bieżuń	urban-rural	Żuromin	Mazovian	121.46	4,924	40.54	-13.7
gmina Kuczbork-Osada	rural	Żuromin	Mazovian	121.59	4,691	38.58	-10.16
gmina Lubowidz	urban-rural	Żuromin	Mazovian	190.78	6,814	35.72	-8.42
gmina Lutocin	rural	Żuromin	Mazovian	126.45	4,217	33.35	-10.37
gmina Siemiątkowo	rural	Żuromin	Mazovian	113.4	3,439	30.33	-11.74
gmina Żuromin	urban-rural	Żuromin	Mazovian	132.92	14,252	107.22	-6.78
Żyrardów	urban	Żyrardów	Mazovian	14.35	39,730	2768.64	-4.98
gmina Mszczonów	urban-rural	Żyrardów	Mazovian	151.85	11,512	75.81	-1.7
gmina Puszcza Mariańska	rural	Żyrardów	Mazovian	143.18	8,680	60.62	3.05
gmina Radziejowice	rural	Żyrardów	Mazovian	73.01	5,859	80.25	11.35
gmina Wiskitki	urban-rural	Żyrardów	Mazovian	150.15	9,835	65.5	-1.22
**Ostrołęka**	urban	city with county rights	Mazovian	33.46	51,893	1550.9	-2.65
**Płock**	urban	city with county rights	Mazovian	88.04	118,989	1351.53	-5.66
**Radom**	urban	city with county rights	Mazovian	111.8	210,532	1883.11	-6
**Siedlce**	urban	city with county rights	Mazovian	31.86	78,258	2456.31	4.63
**Warsaw**	urban	city with county rights	Mazovian	517.24	1,793,579	3467.6	6.67
Brzeg	urban	Brzeg	Opole	14.61	35,491	2429.23	-6.64
gmina Skarbimierz	rural	Brzeg	Opole	110.31	8,303	75.27	13.1
gmina Grodków	urban-rural	Brzeg	Opole	285.95	19,031	66.55	-5.66
gmina Lewin Brzeski	urban-rural	Brzeg	Opole	159.63	12,907	80.86	-4.94
gmina Lubsza	rural	Brzeg	Opole	212.7	8,999	42.31	0.56
gmina Olszanka	rural	Brzeg	Opole	92.76	4,901	52.84	-1.9
gmina Baborów	urban-rural	Głubczyce	Opole	117.03	5,943	50.78	-6.37
gmina Branice	rural	Głubczyce	Opole	121.63	6,400	52.62	-6.48
gmina Głubczyce	urban-rural	Głubczyce	Opole	294.34	22,178	75.35	-5.46
gmina Kietrz	urban-rural	Głubczyce	Opole	139.63	10,770	77.13	-9.3
Kędzierzyn-Koźle	urban	Kędzierzyn-Koźle	Opole	123.71	60,383	488.1	-8.5
gmina Bierawa	rural	Kędzierzyn-Koźle	Opole	118.56	7,927	66.86	-0.63
gmina Cisek	rural	Kędzierzyn-Koźle	Opole	71.08	5,567	78.32	-7.78
gmina Pawłowiczki	rural	Kędzierzyn-Koźle	Opole	153.53	7,382	48.08	-12.29
gmina Polska Cerekiew	rural	Kędzierzyn-Koźle	Opole	60.12	4,003	66.58	-8.59
gmina Reńska Wieś	rural	Kędzierzyn-Koźle	Opole	98.13	8,282	84.4	2.1
gmina Byczyna	urban-rural	Kluczbork	Opole	182.94	9,208	50.33	-7.52
gmina Kluczbork	urban-rural	Kluczbork	Opole	216.96	35,860	165.28	-2.93
gmina Lasowice Wielkie	rural	Kluczbork	Opole	211.04	6,791	32.18	-5.87
gmina Wołczyn	urban-rural	Kluczbork	Opole	240.97	13,407	55.64	-9.61
gmina Gogolin	urban-rural	Krapkowice	Opole	100.57	12,689	126.17	3.97
gmina Krapkowice	urban-rural	Krapkowice	Opole	97.31	22,468	230.89	-6.72
gmina Strzeleczki	rural	Krapkowice	Opole	117.37	7,378	62.86	-2.11
gmina Walce	rural	Krapkowice	Opole	69.11	5,397	78.09	-7.42
gmina Zdzieszowice	urban-rural	Krapkowice	Opole	57.44	15,648	272.42	-4.87
gmina Domaszowice	rural	Namysłów	Opole	114.03	3,580	31.4	-5.34
gmina Namysłów	urban-rural	Namysłów	Opole	290.15	26,235	90.42	4.16
gmina Pokój	rural	Namysłów	Opole	132.91	5,161	38.83	-8.07
gmina Świerczów	rural	Namysłów	Opole	110.35	3,317	30.06	-7.91
gmina Wilków	rural	Namysłów	Opole	100.74	4,387	43.55	-3.7
gmina Głuchołazy	urban-rural	Nysa	Opole	168.07	23,525	139.97	-6.16
gmina Kamiennik	rural	Nysa	Opole	89.37	3,424	38.31	-11.88
gmina Korfantów	urban-rural	Nysa	Opole	179.53	8,703	48.48	-11.71
gmina Łambinowice	rural	Nysa	Opole	123.95	7,431	59.95	-8.51
gmina Nysa	urban-rural	Nysa	Opole	217.67	56,858	261.21	-3.76
gmina Otmuchów	urban-rural	Nysa	Opole	187.4	13,440	71.72	-6.15
gmina Paczków	urban-rural	Nysa	Opole	79.98	12,482	156.06	-7.86
gmina Pakosławice	rural	Nysa	Opole	74.05	3,481	47.01	-6.8
gmina Skoroszyce	rural	Nysa	Opole	103.86	6,180	59.5	-3.59
gmina Dobrodzień	urban-rural	Olesno	Opole	162.82	9,824	60.34	-5.97
gmina Gorzów Śląski	urban-rural	Olesno	Opole	153.71	7,116	46.29	-2.79
gmina Olesno	urban-rural	Olesno	Opole	240.9	17,744	73.66	-1.35
gmina Praszka	urban-rural	Olesno	Opole	103.03	13,448	130.53	-4.28
gmina Radłów	rural	Olesno	Opole	116.87	4,297	36.77	-4.92
gmina Rudniki	rural	Olesno	Opole	100.4	8,126	80.94	-5.12
gmina Zębowice	rural	Olesno	Opole	95.65	3,612	37.76	-5.93
gmina Chrząstowice	rural	Opole	Opole	82.35	7,047	85.57	6.42
gmina Dąbrowa	rural	Opole	Opole	114.11	8,267	72.45	2.47
gmina Dobrzeń Wielki	rural	Opole	Opole	63.47	9,512	149.87	0.32
gmina Komprachcice	rural	Opole	Opole	50.59	9,145	180.77	1.1
gmina Łubniany	rural	Opole	Opole	126.05	9,912	78.64	6.37
gmina Murów	rural	Opole	Opole	160.02	5,303	33.14	-8.04
gmina Niemodlin	urban-rural	Opole	Opole	183.14	13,133	71.71	-5.12
gmina Ozimek	urban-rural	Opole	Opole	125.67	19,473	154.95	-3.23
gmina Popielów	rural	Opole	Opole	175.49	7,999	45.58	-4.09
gmina Prószków	urban-rural	Opole	Opole	118.26	9,106	77	-0.8
gmina Tarnów Opolski	rural	Opole	Opole	81.8	9,653	118.01	2.88
gmina Tułowice	urban-rural	Opole	Opole	81.25	5,206	64.07	-1.34
gmina Turawa	rural	Opole	Opole	172.1	10,057	58.44	7.91
gmina Biała	urban-rural	Prudnik	Opole	196.25	10,572	53.87	-3.54
gmina Głogówek	urban-rural	Prudnik	Opole	169.93	13,174	77.53	-3.74
gmina Lubrza	rural	Prudnik	Opole	83.11	4,330	52.1	-2.53
gmina Prudnik	urban-rural	Prudnik	Opole	122.26	27,015	220.96	-5.09
gmina Izbicko	rural	Strzelce	Opole	84.51	5,401	63.91	-0.55
gmina Jemielnica	rural	Strzelce	Opole	113.46	7,240	63.81	1.76
gmina Kolonowskie	urban-rural	Strzelce	Opole	83.57	5,870	70.24	-2.49
gmina Leśnica	urban-rural	Strzelce	Opole	94.75	7,540	79.58	-10.64
gmina Strzelce Opolskie	urban-rural	Strzelce	Opole	202.53	30,439	150.29	-4.48
gmina Ujazd	urban-rural	Strzelce	Opole	83.31	6,415	77	2.4
gmina Zawadzkie	urban-rural	Strzelce	Opole	82.14	11,266	137.16	-6.31
**Opole**	urban	city with county rights	Opole	148.88	128,012	859.83	-0.34
gmina Czarna	rural	Bieszczady	Subcarpathian	184.77	2,374	12.85	-5.14
gmina Lutowiska	rural	Bieszczady	Subcarpathian	475.63	2,059	4.33	-1.45
gmina Ustrzyki Dolne	urban-rural	Bieszczady	Subcarpathian	478.67	17,143	35.81	-5.75
gmina Brzozów	urban-rural	Brzozów	Subcarpathian	103.07	26,608	258.15	-0.15
gmina Domaradz	rural	Brzozów	Subcarpathian	56.5	6,077	107.56	-1.59
gmina Dydnia	rural	Brzozów	Subcarpathian	130.29	7,910	60.71	-4.43
gmina Haczów	rural	Brzozów	Subcarpathian	71.65	9,122	127.31	-2.87
gmina Jasienica Rosielna	rural	Brzozów	Subcarpathian	57.06	7,856	137.68	1.66
gmina Nozdrzec	rural	Brzozów	Subcarpathian	120.77	7,950	65.83	-10.11
Dębica	urban	Dębica	Subcarpathian	33.83	45,385	1341.56	-5.84
gmina Brzostek	urban-rural	Dębica	Subcarpathian	122.33	12,996	106.24	-2.58
gmina Czarna	rural	Dębica	Subcarpathian	147.99	13,162	88.94	4.14
gmina Dębica	rural	Dębica	Subcarpathian	137.9	25,890	187.74	3.11
gmina Jodłowa	rural	Dębica	Subcarpathian	59.92	5,354	89.35	-3.09
gmina Pilzno	urban-rural	Dębica	Subcarpathian	165.13	18,247	110.5	2.68
gmina Żyraków	rural	Dębica	Subcarpathian	110.38	14,248	129.08	7.43
Jarosław	urban	Jarosław	Subcarpathian	34.61	37,375	1079.89	-6.81
Radymno	urban	Jarosław	Subcarpathian	13.62	5,240	384.73	-6.84
gmina Chłopice	rural	Jarosław	Subcarpathian	49.2	5,531	112.42	-3.17
gmina Jarosław	rural	Jarosław	Subcarpathian	113.48	13,245	116.72	1.84
gmina Laszki	rural	Jarosław	Subcarpathian	138	6,923	50.17	-3.4
gmina Pawłosiów	rural	Jarosław	Subcarpathian	47.42	8,434	177.86	0.59
gmina Pruchnik	urban-rural	Jarosław	Subcarpathian	80.34	9,657	120.2	-5.09
gmina Radymno	rural	Jarosław	Subcarpathian	182.18	11,404	62.6	-0.88
gmina Rokietnica	rural	Jarosław	Subcarpathian	57.08	4,331	75.88	-1.15
gmina Roźwienica	rural	Jarosław	Subcarpathian	68.75	6,245	90.84	0.96
gmina Wiązownica	rural	Jarosław	Subcarpathian	243.98	11,712	48	0.17
Jasło	urban	Jasło	Subcarpathian	36.52	34,721	950.74	-8.37
gmina Brzyska	rural	Jasło	Subcarpathian	44.87	6,518	145.26	-0.51
gmina Dębowiec	rural	Jasło	Subcarpathian	86.47	8,852	102.37	1.89
gmina Jasło	rural	Jasło	Subcarpathian	93.07	16,330	175.46	-0.88
gmina Kołaczyce	urban-rural	Jasło	Subcarpathian	61.1	8,937	146.27	-0.52
gmina Krempna	rural	Jasło	Subcarpathian	203.86	1,857	9.11	-4.27
gmina Nowy Żmigród	rural	Jasło	Subcarpathian	103.59	8,997	86.85	-6.11
gmina Osiek Jasielski	rural	Jasło	Subcarpathian	60.4	5,362	88.77	0.87
gmina Skołyszyn	rural	Jasło	Subcarpathian	78.49	12,505	159.32	0.45
gmina Tarnowiec	rural	Jasło	Subcarpathian	62.5	9,147	146.35	-0.07
gmina Cmolas	rural	Kolbuszowa	Subcarpathian	133.99	8,086	60.35	-1.81
gmina Kolbuszowa	urban-rural	Kolbuszowa	Subcarpathian	170.84	24,697	144.56	-1.29
gmina Majdan Królewski	rural	Kolbuszowa	Subcarpathian	155.26	9,802	63.13	-2.3
gmina Niwiska	rural	Kolbuszowa	Subcarpathian	94.86	6,077	64.06	0.93
gmina Raniżów	rural	Kolbuszowa	Subcarpathian	96.66	7,045	72.88	-1.37
gmina Dzikowiec	rural	Kolbuszowa	Subcarpathian	121.56	6,489	53.38	-1.18
gmina Chorkówka	rural	Krosno	Subcarpathian	77.35	13,466	174.09	-0.4
gmina Dukla	urban-rural	Krosno	Subcarpathian	235.14	14,529	61.79	-3.55
gmina Iwonicz-Zdrój	urban-rural	Krosno	Subcarpathian	45.5	10,846	238.37	-3.75
gmina Jedlicze	urban-rural	Krosno	Subcarpathian	58.57	15,428	263.41	-1.42
gmina Korczyna	rural	Krosno	Subcarpathian	93.06	11,178	120.12	0.6
gmina Krościenko Wyżne	rural	Krosno	Subcarpathian	16.31	5,608	343.84	2.51
gmina Miejsce Piastowe	rural	Krosno	Subcarpathian	51.32	13,695	266.86	0.83
gmina Rymanów	urban-rural	Krosno	Subcarpathian	166.63	15,910	95.48	1.49
gmina Wojaszówka	rural	Krosno	Subcarpathian	83.37	9,358	112.25	2.65
gmina Jaśliska	rural	Krosno	Subcarpathian	165.86	2,177	13.13	-9.46
Leżajsk	urban	Leżajsk	Subcarpathian	20.58	13,715	666.42	-6.55
gmina Grodzisko Dolne	rural	Leżajsk	Subcarpathian	78.57	8,023	102.11	-1.33
gmina Kuryłówka	rural	Leżajsk	Subcarpathian	141.94	5,696	40.13	0.12
gmina Leżajsk	rural	Leżajsk	Subcarpathian	198.89	20,256	101.85	1.09
gmina Nowa Sarzyna	urban-rural	Leżajsk	Subcarpathian	143.73	21,543	149.89	-1.73
Lubaczów	urban	Lubaczów	Subcarpathian	25.73	11,880	461.72	-6.97
gmina Cieszanów	urban-rural	Lubaczów	Subcarpathian	219.44	7,118	32.44	-11.4
gmina Horyniec-Zdrój	rural	Lubaczów	Subcarpathian	203.1	4,614	22.72	-13.91
gmina Lubaczów	rural	Lubaczów	Subcarpathian	202.85	9,194	45.32	-0.25
gmina Narol	urban-rural	Lubaczów	Subcarpathian	203.47	7,930	38.97	-10.09
gmina Oleszyce	urban-rural	Lubaczów	Subcarpathian	151.84	6,320	41.62	-4.65
gmina Stary Dzików	rural	Lubaczów	Subcarpathian	155.7	4,126	26.5	-11.83
gmina Wielkie Oczy	rural	Lubaczów	Subcarpathian	146.24	3,797	25.96	-5.64
Łańcut	urban	Łańcut	Subcarpathian	19.42	17,686	910.71	-1.32
gmina Białobrzegi	rural	Łańcut	Subcarpathian	56.14	8,745	155.77	3.69
gmina Czarna	rural	Łańcut	Subcarpathian	78.07	11,848	151.76	5.17
gmina Łańcut	rural	Łańcut	Subcarpathian	106.3	21,995	206.91	4.79
gmina Markowa	rural	Łańcut	Subcarpathian	68.74	6,483	94.31	-2.76
gmina Rakszawa	rural	Łańcut	Subcarpathian	66.46	7,370	110.89	3.05
gmina Żołynia	rural	Łańcut	Subcarpathian	56.71	7,017	123.73	2.63
Mielec	urban	Mielec	Subcarpathian	46.89	60,229	1284.47	-1.23
gmina Borowa	rural	Mielec	Subcarpathian	55.31	5,509	99.6	-3.54
gmina Czermin	rural	Mielec	Subcarpathian	80.21	7,077	88.23	1.04
gmina Gawłuszowice	rural	Mielec	Subcarpathian	34.01	2,722	80.04	-5.45
gmina Mielec	rural	Mielec	Subcarpathian	122.72	13,435	109.48	4.25
gmina Padew Narodowa	rural	Mielec	Subcarpathian	71.25	5,386	75.59	1.86
gmina Przecław	urban-rural	Mielec	Subcarpathian	134.19	12,022	89.59	4.36
gmina Radomyśl Wielki	urban-rural	Mielec	Subcarpathian	159.78	14,309	89.55	2.32
gmina Tuszów Narodowy	rural	Mielec	Subcarpathian	89.24	8,244	92.38	4.12
gmina Wadowice Górne	rural	Mielec	Subcarpathian	86.9	7,739	89.06	3.38
gmina Harasiuki	rural	Nisko	Subcarpathian	168.17	6,069	36.09	-5.22
gmina Jarocin	rural	Nisko	Subcarpathian	90.79	5,351	58.94	-4.08
gmina Jeżowe	rural	Nisko	Subcarpathian	123.93	10,097	81.47	-1.68
gmina Krzeszów	rural	Nisko	Subcarpathian	62.32	4,246	68.13	-1.17
gmina Nisko	urban-rural	Nisko	Subcarpathian	142.37	22,279	156.49	-1.52
gmina Rudnik nad Sanem	urban-rural	Nisko	Subcarpathian	78.69	10,146	128.94	1.12
gmina Ulanów	urban-rural	Nisko	Subcarpathian	119.37	8,242	69.05	-4.73
gmina Bircza	rural	Przemyśl	Subcarpathian	254.05	6,493	25.56	-7.19
gmina Dubiecko	urban-rural	Przemyśl	Subcarpathian	154.25	9,143	59.27	-5.12
gmina Fredropol	rural	Przemyśl	Subcarpathian	159.6	5,450	34.15	-7.06
gmina Krasiczyn	rural	Przemyśl	Subcarpathian	124.36	5,172	41.59	1.49
gmina Krzywcza	rural	Przemyśl	Subcarpathian	94.95	4,815	50.71	-6.63
gmina Medyka	rural	Przemyśl	Subcarpathian	60.62	6,532	107.75	-1.17
gmina Orły	rural	Przemyśl	Subcarpathian	70.47	8,889	126.14	0.56
gmina Przemyśl	rural	Przemyśl	Subcarpathian	108.43	10,662	98.33	2.7
gmina Stubno	rural	Przemyśl	Subcarpathian	88.7	3,861	43.53	-4.03
gmina Żurawica	rural	Przemyśl	Subcarpathian	95.79	12,951	135.2	1.26
Przeworsk	urban	Przeworsk	Subcarpathian	22.13	15,224	687.93	-5.52
gmina Adamówka	rural	Przeworsk	Subcarpathian	134.28	4,030	30.01	-5.08
gmina Gać	rural	Przeworsk	Subcarpathian	35.96	4,615	128.34	-0.36
gmina Jawornik Polski	rural	Przeworsk	Subcarpathian	62.93	4,440	70.55	-2.32
gmina Kańczuga	urban-rural	Przeworsk	Subcarpathian	105.03	12,286	116.98	-3.45
gmina Przeworsk	rural	Przeworsk	Subcarpathian	90.8	14,867	163.73	-0.02
gmina Sieniawa	urban-rural	Przeworsk	Subcarpathian	127.65	7,020	54.99	-0.09
gmina Tryńcza	rural	Przeworsk	Subcarpathian	70.06	8,507	121.42	2.88
gmina Zarzecze	rural	Przeworsk	Subcarpathian	49.18	7,238	147.17	0.97
gmina Iwierzyce	rural	Ropczyce-Sędziszów	Subcarpathian	65.52	7,747	118.24	1.12
gmina Ostrów	rural	Ropczyce-Sędziszów	Subcarpathian	96.19	7,358	76.49	6.38
gmina Ropczyce	urban-rural	Ropczyce-Sędziszów	Subcarpathian	139.08	27,549	198.08	2.8
gmina Sędziszów Małopolski	urban-rural	Ropczyce-Sędziszów	Subcarpathian	154.04	23,812	154.58	4.49
gmina Wielopole Skrzyńskie	rural	Ropczyce-Sędziszów	Subcarpathian	93.48	8,116	86.82	-7.01
Dynów	urban	Rzeszów	Subcarpathian	24.55	6,122	249.37	-2.22
gmina Błażowa	urban-rural	Rzeszów	Subcarpathian	112.6	10,848	96.34	0.99
gmina Boguchwała	urban-rural	Rzeszów	Subcarpathian	88.96	20,817	234	8.8
gmina Chmielnik	rural	Rzeszów	Subcarpathian	52.92	6,954	131.41	5.87
gmina Dynów	rural	Rzeszów	Subcarpathian	119.02	6,851	57.56	-4.05
gmina Głogów Małopolski	urban-rural	Rzeszów	Subcarpathian	143.8	19,796	137.66	10.1
gmina Hyżne	rural	Rzeszów	Subcarpathian	51.26	7,062	137.77	2.37
gmina Kamień	rural	Rzeszów	Subcarpathian	73.63	6,860	93.17	-0.05
gmina Krasne	rural	Rzeszów	Subcarpathian	39.1	11,682	298.77	19.82
gmina Lubenia	rural	Rzeszów	Subcarpathian	54.91	6,441	117.3	0
gmina Sokołów Małopolski	urban-rural	Rzeszów	Subcarpathian	134.2	17,270	128.69	3.3
gmina Świlcza	rural	Rzeszów	Subcarpathian	108.18	16,263	150.33	7.3
gmina Trzebownisko	rural	Rzeszów	Subcarpathian	90.28	22,461	248.79	18.29
gmina Tyczyn	urban-rural	Rzeszów	Subcarpathian	53.72	10,559	196.56	13.92
Sanok	urban	Sanok	Subcarpathian	38.08	37,210	977.15	-8.78
gmina Besko	rural	Sanok	Subcarpathian	27.48	4,509	164.08	0.22
gmina Bukowsko	rural	Sanok	Subcarpathian	136.93	5,480	40.02	-4.88
gmina Komańcza	rural	Sanok	Subcarpathian	387.7	4,499	11.6	-11.58
gmina Sanok	rural	Sanok	Subcarpathian	231.7	18,087	78.06	4.59
gmina Tyrawa Wołoska	rural	Sanok	Subcarpathian	69.25	1,977	28.55	0.84
gmina Zagórz	urban-rural	Sanok	Subcarpathian	159.89	13,120	82.06	0.89
gmina Zarszyn	rural	Sanok	Subcarpathian	105.4	9,284	88.08	-2.47
Stalowa Wola	urban	Stalowa Wola	Subcarpathian	82.52	60,179	729.27	-10.65
gmina Bojanów	rural	Stalowa Wola	Subcarpathian	179.33	7,613	42.45	4.06
gmina Pysznica	rural	Stalowa Wola	Subcarpathian	146.69	11,250	76.69	10.81
gmina Radomyśl nad Sanem	rural	Stalowa Wola	Subcarpathian	133.9	7,315	54.63	-0.55
gmina Zaklików	urban-rural	Stalowa Wola	Subcarpathian	202.13	8,509	42.1	-4.93
gmina Zaleszany	rural	Stalowa Wola	Subcarpathian	87.17	10,984	126.01	3.33
gmina Czudec	rural	Strzyżów	Subcarpathian	84.7	11,817	139.52	0.42
gmina Frysztak	rural	Strzyżów	Subcarpathian	90.63	10,353	114.23	-3.26
gmina Niebylec	rural	Strzyżów	Subcarpathian	104.44	10,535	100.87	0.76
gmina Strzyżów	urban-rural	Strzyżów	Subcarpathian	140.32	20,614	146.91	-2.56
gmina Wiśniowa	rural	Strzyżów	Subcarpathian	83.38	7,976	95.66	-8.22
gmina Baranów Sandomierski	urban-rural	Tarnobrzeg	Subcarpathian	121.55	11,800	97.08	-4.92
gmina Gorzyce	rural	Tarnobrzeg	Subcarpathian	68.9	13,081	189.85	-5.69
gmina Grębów	rural	Tarnobrzeg	Subcarpathian	187.2	10,017	53.51	3.28
gmina Nowa Dęba	urban-rural	Tarnobrzeg	Subcarpathian	143.41	17,973	125.33	-4.38
gmina Baligród	rural	Lesko	Subcarpathian	158.23	3,172	20.05	-0.32
gmina Cisna	rural	Lesko	Subcarpathian	287.26	1,746	6.08	-4.17
gmina Lesko	urban-rural	Lesko	Subcarpathian	111.39	11,288	101.34	-4.68
gmina Olszanica	rural	Lesko	Subcarpathian	93.54	4,887	52.25	-5
gmina Solina	rural	Lesko	Subcarpathian	184.52	5,320	28.83	0.5
**Krosno**	urban	city with county rights	Subcarpathian	43.5	46,139	1060.67	-2.44
**Przemyśl**	urban	city with county rights	Subcarpathian	46.17	60,442	1309.12	-8.3
**Rzeszów**	urban	city with county rights	Subcarpathian	126.61	196,821	1554.55	9.93
**Tarnobrzeg**	urban	city with county rights	Subcarpathian	85.4	46,588	545.53	-6.63
Augustów	urban	Augustów	Podlachian	80.9	30,135	372.5	-2.05
gmina Augustów	rural	Augustów	Podlachian	266.61	6,737	25.27	-3.49
gmina Bargłów Kościelny	rural	Augustów	Podlachian	187.81	5,473	29.14	-10.03
gmina Lipsk	urban-rural	Augustów	Podlachian	184.21	5,012	27.21	-17.71
gmina Nowinka	rural	Augustów	Podlachian	204.08	2,938	14.4	2.28
gmina Płaska	rural	Augustów	Podlachian	372.67	2,571	6.9	-3.99
gmina Sztabin	rural	Augustów	Podlachian	363.11	5,042	13.89	-7.87
gmina Choroszcz	urban-rural	Białystok	Podlachian	163.79	15,679	95.73	16.77
gmina Czarna Białostocka	urban-rural	Białystok	Podlachian	206.36	11,265	54.59	-7.09
gmina Dobrzyniewo Duże	rural	Białystok	Podlachian	161.13	9,547	59.25	17.46
gmina Gródek	rural	Białystok	Podlachian	429.7	5,111	11.89	-11.72
gmina Juchnowiec Kościelny	rural	Białystok	Podlachian	171.77	16,699	97.22	16.52
gmina Łapy	urban-rural	Białystok	Podlachian	127.65	21,794	170.73	-4.94
gmina Michałowo	urban-rural	Białystok	Podlachian	410.02	6,536	15.94	-10.83
gmina Poświętne	rural	Białystok	Podlachian	114.58	3,360	29.32	-10.11
gmina Supraśl	urban-rural	Białystok	Podlachian	188.56	15,898	84.31	21.8
gmina Suraż	urban-rural	Białystok	Podlachian	76.61	1,961	25.6	-3.54
gmina Turośń Kościelna	rural	Białystok	Podlachian	139.9	6,467	46.23	16.01
gmina Tykocin	urban-rural	Białystok	Podlachian	207.37	6,190	29.85	-5.12
gmina Wasilków	urban-rural	Białystok	Podlachian	127.12	17,768	139.77	32.4
gmina Zabłudów	urban-rural	Białystok	Podlachian	339.74	9,355	27.54	4.35
gmina Zawady	rural	Białystok	Podlachian	112.14	2,703	24.1	-9.32
Bielsk Podlaski	urban	Bielsk	Podlachian	27.01	25,158	931.43	-7.04
Brańsk	urban	Bielsk	Podlachian	32.43	3,739	115.29	-4.68
gmina Bielsk Podlaski	rural	Bielsk	Podlachian	429.94	6,573	15.29	-11.59
gmina Boćki	rural	Bielsk	Podlachian	231.89	4,157	17.93	-19.2
gmina Brańsk	rural	Bielsk	Podlachian	227.43	5,589	24.57	-15.94
gmina Orla	rural	Bielsk	Podlachian	159.9	2,669	16.69	-16.66
gmina Rudka	rural	Bielsk	Podlachian	70.29	1,852	26.35	-10.05
gmina Wyszki	rural	Bielsk	Podlachian	206.2	4,321	20.96	-10.79
Grajewo	urban	Grajewo	Podlachian	18.94	21,812	1151.64	-4.42
gmina Grajewo	rural	Grajewo	Podlachian	308.22	5,799	18.81	-3.82
gmina Radziłów	rural	Grajewo	Podlachian	199.54	4,694	23.52	-7.69
gmina Rajgród	urban-rural	Grajewo	Podlachian	207.26	5,136	24.78	-9.8
gmina Szczuczyn	urban-rural	Grajewo	Podlachian	115.6	6,014	52.02	-6.35
gmina Wąsosz	rural	Grajewo	Podlachian	118.06	3,584	30.36	-12.87
Hajnówka	urban	Hajnówka	Podlachian	21.29	20,391	957.77	-10.33
gmina Białowieża	rural	Hajnówka	Podlachian	203.14	2,160	10.63	-4.89
gmina Czeremcha	rural	Hajnówka	Podlachian	96.82	3,077	31.78	-18.77
gmina Czyże	rural	Hajnówka	Podlachian	134.53	1,933	14.37	-16.67
gmina Dubicze Cerkiewne	rural	Hajnówka	Podlachian	151.44	1,470	9.71	-18.35
gmina Hajnówka	rural	Hajnówka	Podlachian	292.93	3,829	13.07	-8.64
gmina Kleszczele	urban-rural	Hajnówka	Podlachian	142.89	2,440	17.08	-21.45
gmina Narew	rural	Hajnówka	Podlachian	241.51	3,424	14.18	-15.11
gmina Narewka	rural	Hajnówka	Podlachian	338.98	3,569	10.53	-13.54
Kolno	urban	Kolno	Podlachian	25.07	10,164	405.42	-7.49
gmina Grabowo	rural	Kolno	Podlachian	128.59	3,386	26.33	-12.95
gmina Kolno	rural	Kolno	Podlachian	282.28	8,517	30.17	-5.84
gmina Mały Płock	rural	Kolno	Podlachian	139.82	4,725	33.79	-8.87
gmina Stawiski	urban-rural	Kolno	Podlachian	165.55	6,084	36.75	-8.46
gmina Turośl	rural	Kolno	Podlachian	198.79	5,107	25.69	-0.59
gmina Jedwabne	urban-rural	Łomża	Podlachian	159.21	5,279	33.16	-6.36
gmina Łomża	rural	Łomża	Podlachian	206.95	11,207	54.15	9.27
gmina Miastkowo	rural	Łomża	Podlachian	114.85	4,210	36.66	-6.02
gmina Nowogród	urban-rural	Łomża	Podlachian	101.21	4,019	39.71	-3.54
gmina Piątnica	rural	Łomża	Podlachian	219.06	10,668	48.7	-1
gmina Przytuły	rural	Łomża	Podlachian	71.15	2,060	28.95	-16.59
gmina Śniadowo	rural	Łomża	Podlachian	162.98	5,287	32.44	-8.06
gmina Wizna	rural	Łomża	Podlachian	133.38	3,959	29.68	-12.64
gmina Zbójna	rural	Łomża	Podlachian	185.8	4,205	22.63	-0.95
gmina Goniądz	urban-rural	Mońki	Podlachian	376.58	4,918	13.06	-5.03
gmina Jasionówka	rural	Mońki	Podlachian	96.8	2,750	28.41	-8.34
gmina Jaświły	rural	Mońki	Podlachian	175.49	4,822	27.48	-12.08
gmina Knyszyn	urban-rural	Mońki	Podlachian	127.19	4,729	37.18	-5.65
gmina Krypno	rural	Mońki	Podlachian	112.31	3,975	35.39	-5.47
gmina Mońki	urban-rural	Mońki	Podlachian	161.55	14,826	91.77	-4.43
gmina Trzcianne	rural	Mońki	Podlachian	331.87	4,231	12.75	-12.15
Sejny	urban	Sejny	Podlachian	4.49	5,217	1161.92	-17.75
gmina Giby	rural	Sejny	Podlachian	323.2	2,679	8.29	-12.26
gmina Krasnopol	rural	Sejny	Podlachian	171.49	3,774	22.01	-6.45
gmina Puńsk	rural	Sejny	Podlachian	138.59	4,157	29.99	-0.32
gmina Sejny	rural	Sejny	Podlachian	217.4	3,980	18.31	-2.25
Siemiatycze	urban	Siemiatycze	Podlachian	36.25	14,294	394.32	-6.7
gmina Drohiczyn	urban-rural	Siemiatycze	Podlachian	207.96	6,196	29.79	-11.87
gmina Dziadkowice	rural	Siemiatycze	Podlachian	116.11	2,707	23.31	-11.67
gmina Grodzisk	rural	Siemiatycze	Podlachian	203.05	4,140	20.39	-10.02
gmina Mielnik	rural	Siemiatycze	Podlachian	196.39	2,307	11.75	-14.18
gmina Milejczyce	rural	Siemiatycze	Podlachian	151.45	1,701	11.23	-23.36
gmina Nurzec-Stacja	rural	Siemiatycze	Podlachian	214.9	3,745	17.43	-19.34
gmina Perlejewo	rural	Siemiatycze	Podlachian	106.54	2,752	25.83	-13.21
gmina Siemiatycze	rural	Siemiatycze	Podlachian	226.81	6,068	26.75	-2.62
gmina Dąbrowa Białostocka	urban-rural	Sokółka	Podlachian	263.84	11,268	42.71	-13.02
gmina Janów	rural	Sokółka	Podlachian	207.81	4,054	19.51	-10.31
gmina Korycin	rural	Sokółka	Podlachian	117.35	3,184	27.13	-10.96
gmina Krynki	urban-rural	Sokółka	Podlachian	166.04	3,002	18.08	-14.77
gmina Kuźnica	rural	Sokółka	Podlachian	133.36	3,894	29.2	-15.83
gmina Nowy Dwór	rural	Sokółka	Podlachian	121.14	2,583	21.32	-14.66
gmina Sidra	rural	Sokółka	Podlachian	174.09	3,380	19.42	-14
gmina Sokółka	urban-rural	Sokółka	Podlachian	313.56	25,266	80.58	-6.82
gmina Suchowola	urban-rural	Sokółka	Podlachian	255.7	6,833	26.72	-6.17
gmina Szudziałowo	rural	Sokółka	Podlachian	301.61	2,822	9.36	-16.12
gmina Bakałarzewo	rural	Suwałki	Podlachian	122.56	3,098	25.28	-0.75
gmina Filipów	rural	Suwałki	Podlachian	150.81	4,254	28.21	-9.61
gmina Jeleniewo	rural	Suwałki	Podlachian	131.37	3,151	23.99	-0.63
gmina Przerośl	rural	Suwałki	Podlachian	123.62	2,905	23.5	-7.24
gmina Raczki	rural	Suwałki	Podlachian	142.24	5,884	41.37	-6.27
gmina Rutka-Tartak	rural	Suwałki	Podlachian	103.46	2,324	22.46	-5.39
gmina Suwałki	rural	Suwałki	Podlachian	264.61	7,772	29.37	9.8
gmina Szypliszki	rural	Suwałki	Podlachian	156.43	3,896	24.91	-2.81
gmina Wiżajny	rural	Suwałki	Podlachian	111.9	2,322	20.75	-10.54
Wysokie Mazowieckie	urban	Wysokie Mazowieckie	Podlachian	15.24	9,319	611.48	-3.06
gmina Ciechanowiec	urban-rural	Wysokie Mazowieckie	Podlachian	201.18	8,549	42.49	-10.83
gmina Czyżew	urban-rural	Wysokie Mazowieckie	Podlachian	130.4	6,333	48.57	-5.16
gmina Klukowo	rural	Wysokie Mazowieckie	Podlachian	123.85	4,322	34.9	-9.61
gmina Kobylin-Borzymy	rural	Wysokie Mazowieckie	Podlachian	119.42	3,173	26.57	-12.9
gmina Kulesze Kościelne	rural	Wysokie Mazowieckie	Podlachian	115.32	3,067	26.6	-6.54
gmina Nowe Piekuty	rural	Wysokie Mazowieckie	Podlachian	109.7	3,838	34.99	-10.38
gmina Sokoły	rural	Wysokie Mazowieckie	Podlachian	155.6	5,719	36.75	-3.3
gmina Szepietowo	urban-rural	Wysokie Mazowieckie	Podlachian	151.72	6,862	45.23	-9.02
gmina Wysokie Mazowieckie	rural	Wysokie Mazowieckie	Podlachian	166.48	5,470	32.86	4.61
Zambrów	urban	Zambrów	Podlachian	19.02	22,015	1157.47	-2.11
gmina Kołaki Kościelne	rural	Zambrów	Podlachian	73.65	2,281	30.97	-10.17
gmina Rutki	rural	Zambrów	Podlachian	199.99	5,485	27.43	-10.01
gmina Szumowo	rural	Zambrów	Podlachian	141.06	4,788	33.94	-10.56
gmina Zambrów	rural	Zambrów	Podlachian	299.4	8,821	29.46	-6.53
**Białystok**	urban	city with county rights	Podlachian	102.13	297,585	2913.79	0.51
**Łomża**	urban	city with county rights	Podlachian	32.67	62,795	1922.1	-0.25
**Suwałki**	urban	city with county rights	Podlachian	65.51	69,786	1065.27	0.6
gmina Borzytuchom	rural	Bytów	Pomeranian	108.52	3,397	31.3	20.11
gmina Bytów	urban-rural	Bytów	Pomeranian	196.92	25,388	128.93	0.17
gmina Czarna Dąbrówka	rural	Bytów	Pomeranian	298.06	5,911	19.83	2.55
gmina Kołczygłowy	rural	Bytów	Pomeranian	170.02	4,225	24.85	-1.42
gmina Lipnica	rural	Bytów	Pomeranian	308.81	5,209	16.87	1.93
gmina Miastko	urban-rural	Bytów	Pomeranian	466.1	19,428	41.68	-4.91
gmina Parchowo	rural	Bytów	Pomeranian	131.21	3,798	28.95	5.77
gmina Studzienice	rural	Bytów	Pomeranian	176.26	3,785	21.47	10.89
gmina Trzebielino	rural	Bytów	Pomeranian	225.97	3,704	16.39	-0.36
gmina Tuchomie	rural	Bytów	Pomeranian	110.2	4,291	38.94	4.7
Chojnice	urban	Chojnice	Pomeranian	21.04	39,724	1888.02	-1.89
gmina Brusy	urban-rural	Chojnice	Pomeranian	400.45	14,598	36.45	3.96
gmina Chojnice	rural	Chojnice	Pomeranian	458.21	19,440	42.43	10.54
gmina Czersk	urban-rural	Chojnice	Pomeranian	380.11	21,606	56.84	0.08
gmina Konarzyny	rural	Chojnice	Pomeranian	104.4	2,309	22.12	6.88
Człuchów	urban	Człuchów	Pomeranian	12.78	13,569	1061.74	-7.72
gmina Czarne	urban-rural	Człuchów	Pomeranian	234.83	9,008	38.36	-8.23
gmina Człuchów	rural	Człuchów	Pomeranian	361.47	11,147	30.84	3.83
gmina Debrzno	urban-rural	Człuchów	Pomeranian	224.03	8,949	39.95	-8.32
gmina Koczała	rural	Człuchów	Pomeranian	223.39	3,331	14.91	-5.84
gmina Przechlewo	rural	Człuchów	Pomeranian	243.97	6,313	25.88	-2.78
gmina Rzeczenica	rural	Człuchów	Pomeranian	274.8	3,616	13.16	-5.29
Pruszcz Gdański	urban	Gdańsk	Pomeranian	16.47	31,471	1910.81	12.86
gmina Cedry Wielkie	rural	Gdańsk	Pomeranian	124.27	6,973	56.11	1.25
gmina Kolbudy	rural	Gdańsk	Pomeranian	82.66	17,979	217.51	27.43
gmina Pruszcz Gdański	rural	Gdańsk	Pomeranian	143.8	31,751	220.8	36.12
gmina Przywidz	rural	Gdańsk	Pomeranian	129.34	5,979	46.23	7.99
gmina Pszczółki	rural	Gdańsk	Pomeranian	50.12	9,758	194.69	15.03
gmina Suchy Dąb	rural	Gdańsk	Pomeranian	84.51	4,258	50.38	3.23
gmina Trąbki Wielkie	rural	Gdańsk	Pomeranian	162.58	11,193	68.85	4.81
gmina Chmielno	rural	Kartuzy	Pomeranian	78.61	7,828	99.58	11.32
gmina Kartuzy	urban-rural	Kartuzy	Pomeranian	206.45	34,092	165.13	4.16
gmina Przodkowo	rural	Kartuzy	Pomeranian	85.18	9,803	115.09	26.62
gmina Sierakowice	rural	Kartuzy	Pomeranian	182.22	20,229	111.01	15.22
gmina Somonino	rural	Kartuzy	Pomeranian	112.11	10,867	96.93	11.26
gmina Stężyca	rural	Kartuzy	Pomeranian	160.47	10,719	66.8	12.79
gmina Sulęczyno	rural	Kartuzy	Pomeranian	131.46	5,581	42.45	9.62
gmina Żukowo	urban-rural	Kartuzy	Pomeranian	164.04	41,651	253.91	44.97
Kościerzyna	urban	Kościerzyna	Pomeranian	15.86	23,757	1497.92	-1.41
gmina Dziemiany	rural	Kościerzyna	Pomeranian	125.38	4,410	35.17	6.04
gmina Karsin	rural	Kościerzyna	Pomeranian	169.43	6,249	36.88	-0.48
gmina Kościerzyna	rural	Kościerzyna	Pomeranian	309.89	16,131	52.05	9.05
gmina Liniewo	rural	Kościerzyna	Pomeranian	110.03	4,590	41.72	-3.39
gmina Lipusz	rural	Kościerzyna	Pomeranian	108.95	3,759	34.5	6.65
gmina Nowa Karczma	rural	Kościerzyna	Pomeranian	113.4	7,080	62.43	11.46
gmina Stara Kiszewa	rural	Kościerzyna	Pomeranian	212.73	6,832	32.12	9.24
Kwidzyn	urban	Kwidzyn	Pomeranian	21.54	38,338	1779.85	-2.31
gmina Gardeja	rural	Kwidzyn	Pomeranian	192.7	8,401	43.6	-2.13
gmina Kwidzyn	rural	Kwidzyn	Pomeranian	207.37	11,424	55.09	0.99
gmina Prabuty	urban-rural	Kwidzyn	Pomeranian	197.13	13,043	66.16	-3.25
gmina Ryjewo	rural	Kwidzyn	Pomeranian	103.71	5,819	56.11	-5.33
gmina Sadlinki	rural	Kwidzyn	Pomeranian	112.25	6,003	53.48	2.12
Lębork	urban	Lębork	Pomeranian	17.86	35,203	1971.05	-1.4
Łeba	urban	Lębork	Pomeranian	14.81	3,572	241.19	-13.35
gmina Cewice	rural	Lębork	Pomeranian	187.61	7,577	40.39	1.46
gmina Nowa Wieś Lęborska	rural	Lębork	Pomeranian	270.45	13,692	50.63	2.72
gmina Wicko	rural	Lębork	Pomeranian	215.29	6,025	27.99	0.06
Malbork	urban	Malbork	Pomeranian	17.16	38,278	2230.65	-4.37
gmina Lichnowy	rural	Malbork	Pomeranian	88.91	4,604	51.78	-5.73
gmina Malbork	rural	Malbork	Pomeranian	100.67	4,841	48.09	7.41
gmina Miłoradz	rural	Malbork	Pomeranian	93.7	3,351	35.76	-4.34
gmina Nowy Staw	urban-rural	Malbork	Pomeranian	114.3	7,617	66.64	-0.17
gmina Stare Pole	rural	Malbork	Pomeranian	79.49	4,710	59.25	0.71
Krynica Morska	urban	Nowy Dwór	Pomeranian	116.01	1,279	11.02	-11.21
gmina Nowy Dwór Gdański	urban-rural	Nowy Dwór	Pomeranian	213.2	17,638	82.73	-4.74
gmina Ostaszewo	rural	Nowy Dwór	Pomeranian	60.7	3,209	52.87	-3.51
gmina Stegna	rural	Nowy Dwór	Pomeranian	170.09	9,722	57.16	-3.47
gmina Sztutowo	rural	Nowy Dwór	Pomeranian	111.53	3,635	32.59	-2.92
Hel	urban	Puck	Pomeranian	21.72	3,240	149.17	-17.19
gmina Jastarnia	urban-rural	Puck	Pomeranian	7.8	3,684	472.31	-7.75
Puck	urban	Puck	Pomeranian	4.79	11,238	2346.14	-1.89
Władysławowo	urban-rural	Puck	Pomeranian	39.22	15,332	390.92	-2.75
gmina Kosakowo	rural	Puck	Pomeranian	50.14	15,977	318.65	52.61
gmina Krokowa	rural	Puck	Pomeranian	211.09	10,813	51.22	2.67
gmina Puck	rural	Puck	Pomeranian	237.38	26,899	113.32	13.6
Ustka	urban	Słupsk	Pomeranian	10.19	15,273	1498.82	-10.7
gmina Damnica	rural	Słupsk	Pomeranian	167.66	6,097	36.37	-6
gmina Dębnica Kaszubska	rural	Słupsk	Pomeranian	299.52	9,498	31.71	-8.22
gmina Główczyce	rural	Słupsk	Pomeranian	321.97	8,929	27.73	-10.35
gmina Kępice	urban-rural	Słupsk	Pomeranian	293.05	9,003	30.72	-11.19
gmina Kobylnica	rural	Słupsk	Pomeranian	243.91	13,064	53.56	28.98
gmina Potęgowo	rural	Słupsk	Pomeranian	228.46	6,854	30	-6.81
gmina Słupsk	rural	Słupsk	Pomeranian	261.73	18,354	70.13	15.39
gmina Smołdzino	rural	Słupsk	Pomeranian	260.29	3,380	12.99	-4.11
gmina Ustka	rural	Słupsk	Pomeranian	217.46	8,329	38.3	-1.99
gmina Czarna Woda	urban-rural	Starogard	Pomeranian	27.73	3,141	113.27	-9.27
Skórcz	urban	Starogard	Pomeranian	3.63	3,624	998.35	7.28
Starogard Gdański	urban	Starogard	Pomeranian	25.28	47,535	1880.34	-4.23
gmina Bobowo	rural	Starogard	Pomeranian	51.63	3,226	62.48	7.66
gmina Kaliska	rural	Starogard	Pomeranian	110.58	5,407	48.9	4.73
gmina Lubichowo	rural	Starogard	Pomeranian	160.9	6,674	41.48	10.25
gmina Osieczna	rural	Starogard	Pomeranian	122.98	2,882	23.43	3.61
gmina Osiek	rural	Starogard	Pomeranian	156.16	2,373	15.2	-8.56
gmina Skarszewy	urban-rural	Starogard	Pomeranian	169.58	14,953	88.18	3.5
gmina Skórcz	rural	Starogard	Pomeranian	96.86	4,594	47.43	-2.1
gmina Smętowo Graniczne	rural	Starogard	Pomeranian	86.01	5,168	60.09	-4.28
gmina Starogard Gdański	rural	Starogard	Pomeranian	196.21	16,781	85.53	12.36
gmina Zblewo	rural	Starogard	Pomeranian	137.79	11,906	86.41	9.36
Tczew	urban	Tczew	Pomeranian	22.38	59,828	2673.28	-2.53
gmina Gniew	urban-rural	Tczew	Pomeranian	194.12	15,391	79.29	-5.86
gmina Morzeszczyn	rural	Tczew	Pomeranian	91.19	3,631	39.82	-3.46
gmina Pelplin	urban-rural	Tczew	Pomeranian	141.02	16,101	114.18	-6.52
gmina Subkowy	rural	Tczew	Pomeranian	77.8	5,499	70.68	-2.35
gmina Tczew	rural	Tczew	Pomeranian	170.6	15,191	89.04	21.59
Reda	urban	Wejherowo	Pomeranian	33.46	26,535	793.04	21.59
Rumia	urban	Wejherowo	Pomeranian	30.1	49,363	1639.97	7.16
Wejherowo	urban	Wejherowo	Pomeranian	26.99	49,351	1828.49	-4.45
gmina Choczewo	rural	Wejherowo	Pomeranian	183.13	5,477	29.91	-4.28
gmina Gniewino	rural	Wejherowo	Pomeranian	176.27	7,463	42.34	-0.62
gmina Linia	rural	Wejherowo	Pomeranian	119.81	6,450	53.84	8.3
gmina Luzino	rural	Wejherowo	Pomeranian	111.47	16,675	149.59	18.97
gmina Łęczyce	rural	Wejherowo	Pomeranian	232.86	12,090	51.92	1.38
gmina Szemud	rural	Wejherowo	Pomeranian	176.91	18,452	104.3	22.47
gmina Wejherowo	rural	Wejherowo	Pomeranian	194.25	26,910	138.53	24.03
gmina Dzierzgoń	urban-rural	Sztum	Pomeranian	131.03	9,178	70.05	-6.7
gmina Mikołajki Pomorskie	rural	Sztum	Pomeranian	91.6	3,615	39.47	-7.18
gmina Stary Dzierzgoń	rural	Sztum	Pomeranian	185.7	3,888	20.94	-15.94
gmina Stary Targ	rural	Sztum	Pomeranian	141.35	6,217	43.98	-7.81
gmina Sztum	urban-rural	Sztum	Pomeranian	181.06	18,243	100.76	-6.76
**Gdańsk**	urban	city with county rights	Pomeranian	261.96	471,525	1799.99	5.17
**Gdynia**	urban	city with county rights	Pomeranian	135.14	245,867	1819.35	-1.05
**Słupsk**	urban	city with county rights	Pomeranian	43.15	90,320	2093.16	-5.1
**Sopot**	urban	city with county rights	Pomeranian	17.28	35,562	2057.99	-10.45
Będzin	urban	Będzin	Silesian	37.37	56,191	1503.64	-7.07
Czeladź	urban	Będzin	Silesian	16.38	31,287	1910.07	-6.74
Wojkowice	urban	Będzin	Silesian	12.79	8,925	697.81	-3.63
gmina Bobrowniki	rural	Będzin	Silesian	51.48	12,133	235.68	4.74
gmina Mierzęcice	rural	Będzin	Silesian	49.43	7,622	154.2	-2.65
gmina Psary	rural	Będzin	Silesian	46.16	12,253	265.45	7.48
gmina Siewierz	urban-rural	Będzin	Silesian	113.85	12,414	109.04	0.59
Sławków	urban	Będzin	Silesian	36.67	6,991	190.65	-3.88
Szczyrk	urban	Bielsko	Silesian	39.07	5,731	146.69	0.99
gmina Bestwina	rural	Bielsko	Silesian	37.92	11,931	314.64	8.41
gmina Buczkowice	rural	Bielsko	Silesian	19.46	11,209	576	0.89
gmina Czechowice-Dziedzice	urban-rural	Bielsko	Silesian	66.48	45,515	684.64	3.71
gmina Jasienica	rural	Bielsko	Silesian	91.67	24,491	267.16	10.21
gmina Jaworze	rural	Bielsko	Silesian	21.13	7,437	351.96	10.39
gmina Kozy	rural	Bielsko	Silesian	26.74	13,084	489.3	6.56
gmina Porąbka	rural	Bielsko	Silesian	64.43	15,605	242.2	1.95
gmina Wilamowice	urban-rural	Bielsko	Silesian	57.34	17,770	309.91	10.81
gmina Wilkowice	rural	Bielsko	Silesian	34.4	13,442	390.76	3.27
Cieszyn	urban	Cieszyn	Silesian	28.61	34,297	1198.78	-6.37
Ustroń	urban	Cieszyn	Silesian	59.03	16,055	271.98	0.1
Wisła	urban	Cieszyn	Silesian	110.17	11,040	100.21	-0.33
gmina Brenna	rural	Cieszyn	Silesian	95.61	11,308	118.27	4.07
gmina Chybie	rural	Cieszyn	Silesian	31.75	9,804	308.79	2.12
gmina Dębowiec	rural	Cieszyn	Silesian	42.64	5,838	136.91	0.57
gmina Goleszów	rural	Cieszyn	Silesian	65.87	13,178	200.06	1.88
gmina Hażlach	rural	Cieszyn	Silesian	48.78	10,914	223.74	5.71
gmina Istebna	rural	Cieszyn	Silesian	84.32	12,183	144.49	2.64
gmina Skoczów	urban-rural	Cieszyn	Silesian	63.55	26,878	422.94	1.22
gmina Strumień	urban-rural	Cieszyn	Silesian	58.54	13,272	226.72	5.25
gmina Zebrzydowice	rural	Cieszyn	Silesian	41.42	13,238	319.6	0.4
gmina Blachownia	urban-rural	Częstochowa	Silesian	66.61	12,911	193.83	-5.41
gmina Dąbrowa Zielona	rural	Częstochowa	Silesian	100.21	3,846	38.38	-3.36
gmina Janów	rural	Częstochowa	Silesian	146.75	5,966	40.65	-0.17
gmina Kamienica Polska	rural	Częstochowa	Silesian	46.45	5,537	119.2	-5.42
gmina Kłomnice	rural	Częstochowa	Silesian	147.73	13,436	90.95	-4.79
gmina Koniecpol	urban-rural	Częstochowa	Silesian	146.62	9,358	63.82	-9.95
gmina Konopiska	rural	Częstochowa	Silesian	78.51	10,713	136.45	-1.4
gmina Kruszyna	rural	Częstochowa	Silesian	93.55	4,804	51.35	-4.54
gmina Lelów	rural	Częstochowa	Silesian	123.69	4,792	38.74	-9.55
gmina Mstów	rural	Częstochowa	Silesian	119.57	10,840	90.66	0.99
gmina Mykanów	rural	Częstochowa	Silesian	141.56	15,144	106.98	3.5
gmina Olsztyn	rural	Częstochowa	Silesian	109.1	7,824	71.71	0.04
gmina Poczesna	rural	Częstochowa	Silesian	59.98	12,690	211.57	-1.68
gmina Przyrów	rural	Częstochowa	Silesian	80.4	3,739	46.5	-6.25
gmina Rędziny	rural	Częstochowa	Silesian	41.23	9,900	240.12	-4.11
gmina Starcza	rural	Częstochowa	Silesian	20.09	2,841	141.41	2.48
Knurów	urban	Gliwice	Silesian	33.95	38,004	1119.41	-4.95
Pyskowice	urban	Gliwice	Silesian	30.89	18,450	597.28	0.16
gmina Gierałtowice	rural	Gliwice	Silesian	38.06	12,228	321.28	7.64
gmina Pilchowice	rural	Gliwice	Silesian	69.83	12,088	173.11	9.18
gmina Rudziniec	rural	Gliwice	Silesian	159.14	10,643	66.88	0.19
gmina Sośnicowice	urban-rural	Gliwice	Silesian	116.5	8,921	76.58	3.88
gmina Toszek	urban-rural	Gliwice	Silesian	99.82	9,356	93.73	-2.38
gmina Wielowieś	rural	Gliwice	Silesian	116.18	5,850	50.35	-1.7
gmina Kłobuck	urban-rural	Kłobuck	Silesian	130.01	20,297	156.12	-2.81
gmina Krzepice	urban-rural	Kłobuck	Silesian	78.94	9,070	114.9	-6.17
gmina Lipie	rural	Kłobuck	Silesian	99.05	6,208	62.68	-5.15
gmina Miedźno	rural	Kłobuck	Silesian	112.77	7,555	66.99	-0.48
gmina Opatów	rural	Kłobuck	Silesian	73.48	6,805	92.61	-0.49
gmina Panki	rural	Kłobuck	Silesian	54.94	5,035	91.65	-4.33
gmina Popów	rural	Kłobuck	Silesian	102.29	5,858	57.27	-5.18
gmina Przystajń	rural	Kłobuck	Silesian	88.83	5,864	66.01	-2.04
gmina Wręczyca Wielka	rural	Kłobuck	Silesian	148.28	17,809	120.1	2.09
Lubliniec	urban	Lubliniec	Silesian	89.36	23,658	264.75	-4.18
gmina Boronów	rural	Lubliniec	Silesian	57.28	3,431	59.9	5.4
gmina Ciasna	rural	Lubliniec	Silesian	133.95	7,462	55.71	-1.91
gmina Herby	rural	Lubliniec	Silesian	85.91	6,793	79.07	-4.23
gmina Kochanowice	rural	Lubliniec	Silesian	80.02	6,949	86.84	2.65
gmina Koszęcin	rural	Lubliniec	Silesian	129.18	11,795	91.31	-1.55
gmina Pawonków	rural	Lubliniec	Silesian	118.93	6,644	55.86	-0.7
gmina Woźniki	urban-rural	Lubliniec	Silesian	127.62	9,594	75.18	-1.87
Łaziska Górne	urban	Mikołów	Silesian	20.11	22,187	1103.28	-3.74
Mikołów	urban	Mikołów	Silesian	79.21	41,078	518.6	7.27
Orzesze	urban	Mikołów	Silesian	83.71	21,221	253.51	8.99
gmina Ornontowice	rural	Mikołów	Silesian	15.45	6,184	400.26	11.08
gmina Wyry	rural	Mikołów	Silesian	34.62	8,541	246.71	20.1
Myszków	urban	Myszków	Silesian	73.59	31,454	427.42	-6.79
gmina Koziegłowy	urban-rural	Myszków	Silesian	159.64	14,324	89.73	-0.81
gmina Niegowa	rural	Myszków	Silesian	87.96	5,612	63.8	-5.41
gmina Poraj	rural	Myszków	Silesian	57.06	10,874	190.57	-1.07
gmina Żarki	urban-rural	Myszków	Silesian	101	8,445	83.61	-0.47
gmina Goczałkowice-Zdrój	rural	Pszczyna	Silesian	47.39	6,758	142.6	2.33
gmina Kobiór	rural	Pszczyna	Silesian	48.19	4,923	102.16	-0.07
gmina Miedźna	rural	Pszczyna	Silesian	50.09	16,600	331.4	6.39
gmina Pawłowice	rural	Pszczyna	Silesian	75.68	18,165	240.02	1.2
gmina Pszczyna	urban-rural	Pszczyna	Silesian	174.73	52,849	302.46	3.29
gmina Suszec	rural	Pszczyna	Silesian	75.08	12,387	164.98	7.12
Racibórz	urban	Racibórz	Silesian	75.01	54,529	726.96	-4.52
gmina Kornowac	rural	Racibórz	Silesian	26.2	5,191	198.13	2.78
gmina Krzanowice	urban-rural	Racibórz	Silesian	47.2	5,721	121.21	-2.2
gmina Krzyżanowice	rural	Racibórz	Silesian	69.7	11,222	161	-3.86
gmina Kuźnia Raciborska	urban-rural	Racibórz	Silesian	126.62	11,731	92.65	-4.76
gmina Nędza	rural	Racibórz	Silesian	57.22	7,462	130.41	1.88
gmina Pietrowice Wielkie	rural	Racibórz	Silesian	67.93	6,892	101.46	-1.88
gmina Rudnik	rural	Racibórz	Silesian	73.88	5,178	70.09	-0.06
gmina Czerwionka-Leszczyny	urban-rural	Rybnik	Silesian	114.64	42,059	366.88	-0.7
gmina Gaszowice	rural	Rybnik	Silesian	19.85	9,792	493.3	6.1
gmina Jejkowice	rural	Rybnik	Silesian	7.59	4,162	548.35	4.77
gmina Lyski	rural	Rybnik	Silesian	57.39	9,671	168.51	0.59
gmina Świerklany	rural	Rybnik	Silesian	24.17	12,532	518.49	6.08
Kalety	urban	Tarnowskie Góry	Silesian	76.29	8,573	112.37	-2.63
Miasteczko Śląskie	urban	Tarnowskie Góry	Silesian	67.83	7,422	109.42	0.36
Radzionków	urban	Tarnowskie Góry	Silesian	13.2	16,906	1280.76	1.32
Tarnowskie Góry	urban	Tarnowskie Góry	Silesian	83.88	61,756	736.24	2.53
gmina Krupski Młyn	rural	Tarnowskie Góry	Silesian	39.08	3,171	81.14	-2.72
gmina Ożarowice	rural	Tarnowskie Góry	Silesian	45.88	5,820	126.85	5.27
gmina Świerklaniec	rural	Tarnowskie Góry	Silesian	44.63	12,504	280.17	13.64
gmina Tworóg	rural	Tarnowskie Góry	Silesian	125.04	8,308	66.44	6.05
gmina Zbrosławice	rural	Tarnowskie Góry	Silesian	148.36	16,339	110.13	8.34
Bieruń	urban	Bieruń-Lędziny	Silesian	40.49	19,457	480.54	-3.5
Imielin	urban	Bieruń-Lędziny	Silesian	27.99	9,274	331.33	11.89
Lędziny	urban	Bieruń-Lędziny	Silesian	31.65	16,783	530.27	0.5
gmina Bojszowy	rural	Bieruń-Lędziny	Silesian	34.69	7,994	230.44	11.26
gmina Chełm Śląski	rural	Bieruń-Lędziny	Silesian	23.33	6,356	272.44	5.73
Pszów	urban	Wodzisław	Silesian	20.44	13,814	675.83	-7.63
Radlin	urban	Wodzisław	Silesian	12.53	17,747	1416.36	-2.06
Rydułtowy	urban	Wodzisław	Silesian	14.95	21,525	1439.8	-3.69
Wodzisław Śląski	urban	Wodzisław	Silesian	49.51	47,685	963.14	-5.15
gmina Godów	rural	Wodzisław	Silesian	38.05	13,810	362.94	3.92
gmina Gorzyce	rural	Wodzisław	Silesian	64.58	21,355	330.68	4.79
gmina Lubomia	rural	Wodzisław	Silesian	41.78	7,902	189.13	0.46
gmina Marklowice	rural	Wodzisław	Silesian	13.69	5,408	395.03	-0.74
gmina Mszana	rural	Wodzisław	Silesian	31.22	7,693	246.41	2.35
Poręba	urban	Zawiercie	Silesian	39.99	8,451	211.33	-6.58
Zawiercie	urban	Zawiercie	Silesian	85.25	48,934	574.01	-7.56
gmina Irządze	rural	Zawiercie	Silesian	71	2,583	36.38	-12.95
gmina Kroczyce	rural	Zawiercie	Silesian	110.05	6,289	57.15	-0.69
gmina Łazy	urban-rural	Zawiercie	Silesian	132.93	15,873	119.41	-2.63
gmina Ogrodzieniec	urban-rural	Zawiercie	Silesian	84.73	9,046	106.76	-5.72
gmina Pilica	urban-rural	Zawiercie	Silesian	142.76	8,529	59.74	-6.6
gmina Szczekociny	urban-rural	Zawiercie	Silesian	133.93	7,621	56.9	-10.37
gmina Włodowice	rural	Zawiercie	Silesian	76.79	5,232	68.13	0.51
gmina Żarnowiec	rural	Zawiercie	Silesian	124.8	4,579	36.69	-7.95
Żywiec	urban	Żywiec	Silesian	50.54	30,951	612.41	-6.63
gmina Czernichów	rural	Żywiec	Silesian	56.4	6,700	118.79	-5.12
gmina Gilowice	rural	Żywiec	Silesian	27.95	6,268	224.26	1.81
gmina Jeleśnia	rural	Żywiec	Silesian	170.62	13,207	77.41	-3.83
gmina Koszarawa	rural	Żywiec	Silesian	31.56	2,362	74.84	-6.55
gmina Lipowa	rural	Żywiec	Silesian	58.72	10,875	185.2	6.05
gmina Łękawica	rural	Żywiec	Silesian	42.77	4,548	106.34	2.06
gmina Łodygowice	rural	Żywiec	Silesian	35.86	14,581	406.61	8.46
gmina Milówka	rural	Żywiec	Silesian	98.88	10,064	101.78	0.83
gmina Radziechowy-Wieprz	rural	Żywiec	Silesian	64.86	13,085	201.74	-0.03
gmina Rajcza	rural	Żywiec	Silesian	131.42	8,767	66.71	-4.86
gmina Ślemień	rural	Żywiec	Silesian	45.02	3,528	78.37	-1.88
gmina Świnna	rural	Żywiec	Silesian	39.18	8,083	206.3	-0.45
gmina Ujsoły	rural	Żywiec	Silesian	109.81	4,420	40.25	-10.12
gmina Węgierska Górka	rural	Żywiec	Silesian	76.47	15,011	196.3	-2.89
**Bielsko-Biała**	urban	city with county rights	Silesian	124.51	170,303	1367.79	-2.97
**Bytom**	urban	city with county rights	Silesian	69.44	164,447	2368.19	-9
**Chorzów**	urban	city with county rights	Silesian	33.24	107,443	3232.34	-5.24
**Częstochowa**	urban	city with county rights	Silesian	159.71	219,278	1372.98	-9.01
**Dąbrowa Górnicza**	urban	city with county rights	Silesian	188.73	118,899	630	-6.88
**Gliwice**	urban	city with county rights	Silesian	133.88	178,186	1330.94	-6.52
**Jastrzębie-Zdrój**	urban	city with county rights	Silesian	85.33	88,425	1036.27	-4.79
**Jaworzno**	urban	city with county rights	Silesian	152.59	90,759	594.79	-5.29
**Katowice**	urban	city with county rights	Silesian	164.64	291,774	1772.19	-6.12
**Mysłowice**	urban	city with county rights	Silesian	65.62	74,601	1136.86	0
**Piekary Śląskie**	urban	city with county rights	Silesian	39.98	54,860	1372.19	-5.77
**Ruda Śląska**	urban	city with county rights	Silesian	77.73	137,030	1762.9	-4.16
**Rybnik**	urban	city with county rights	Silesian	148.36	137,782	928.7	-3.11
**Siemianowice Śląskie**	urban	city with county rights	Silesian	25.5	66,587	2611.25	-5.56
**Sosnowiec**	urban	city with county rights	Silesian	91.06	198,996	2185.33	-9.79
**Świętochłowice**	urban	city with county rights	Silesian	13.31	49,363	3708.72	-7.75
**Tychy**	urban	city with county rights	Silesian	81.81	127,307	1556.13	-2.3
**Zabrze**	urban	city with county rights	Silesian	80.4	171,691	2135.46	-6.37
**Żory**	urban	city with county rights	Silesian	64.64	62,670	969.52	3.03
gmina Busko-Zdrój	urban-rural	Busko	Świętokrzyskie	235.5	32,180	136.65	-4.13
gmina Gnojno	rural	Busko	Świętokrzyskie	96.31	4,330	44.96	-7.28
gmina Nowy Korczyn	urban-rural	Busko	Świętokrzyskie	116.67	5,869	50.3	-10.73
gmina Pacanów	urban-rural	Busko	Świętokrzyskie	124.58	7,303	58.62	-6.35
gmina Solec-Zdrój	rural	Busko	Świętokrzyskie	85.04	5,022	59.05	-2.31
gmina Stopnica	urban-rural	Busko	Świętokrzyskie	125.96	7,589	60.25	-4.74
gmina Tuczępy	rural	Busko	Świętokrzyskie	83.62	3,721	44.5	-1.43
gmina Wiślica	urban-rural	Busko	Świętokrzyskie	100.32	5,437	54.2	-5.76
gmina Imielno	rural	Jędrzejów	Świętokrzyskie	101.01	4,318	42.75	-8.8
gmina Jędrzejów	urban-rural	Jędrzejów	Świętokrzyskie	226.62	27,797	122.66	-7.4
gmina Małogoszcz	urban-rural	Jędrzejów	Świętokrzyskie	146.05	11,528	78.93	-3.56
gmina Nagłowice	rural	Jędrzejów	Świętokrzyskie	117.29	4,906	41.83	-6.11
gmina Oksa	rural	Jędrzejów	Świętokrzyskie	90.72	4,552	50.18	-2.26
gmina Sędziszów	urban-rural	Jędrzejów	Świętokrzyskie	145.65	12,389	85.06	-6.61
gmina Słupia	rural	Jędrzejów	Świętokrzyskie	108.42	4,276	39.44	-6.77
gmina Sobków	rural	Jędrzejów	Świętokrzyskie	144.31	8,478	58.75	-1.45
gmina Wodzisław	urban-rural	Jędrzejów	Świętokrzyskie	176.89	6,935	39.21	-7.39
gmina Bejsce	rural	Kazimierza	Świętokrzyskie	57.48	3,974	69.14	-11.31
gmina Czarnocin	rural	Kazimierza	Świętokrzyskie	70.32	3,741	53.2	-8.07
gmina Kazimierza Wielka	urban-rural	Kazimierza	Świętokrzyskie	139.86	16,069	114.89	-4.6
gmina Opatowiec	urban-rural	Kazimierza	Świętokrzyskie	68.58	3,265	47.61	-2.54
gmina Skalbmierz	urban-rural	Kazimierza	Świętokrzyskie	85.94	6,440	74.94	-5.68
gmina Bieliny	rural	Kielce	Świętokrzyskie	88.22	10,278	116.5	1.14
gmina Bodzentyn	urban-rural	Kielce	Świętokrzyskie	159.75	11,435	71.58	-5.82
gmina Chęciny	urban-rural	Kielce	Świętokrzyskie	127.39	15,066	118.27	2.18
gmina Chmielnik	urban-rural	Kielce	Świętokrzyskie	142.19	11,239	79.04	-4.76
gmina Daleszyce	urban-rural	Kielce	Świętokrzyskie	222.39	15,884	71.42	3.08
gmina Górno	rural	Kielce	Świętokrzyskie	83.16	14,593	175.48	9.4
gmina Łagów	urban-rural	Kielce	Świętokrzyskie	113.23	6,862	60.6	-1.89
gmina Łopuszno	rural	Kielce	Świętokrzyskie	177	8,988	50.78	-0.44
gmina Masłów	rural	Kielce	Świętokrzyskie	85.55	11,087	129.6	10.84
gmina Miedziana Góra	rural	Kielce	Świętokrzyskie	71.14	11,654	163.82	8.85
gmina Mniów	rural	Kielce	Świętokrzyskie	95.28	9,341	98.04	-0.71
gmina Morawica	urban-rural	Kielce	Świętokrzyskie	140.38	16,827	119.87	14.35
gmina Nowa Słupia	urban-rural	Kielce	Świętokrzyskie	85.76	9,439	110.06	-3.16
gmina Piekoszów	rural	Kielce	Świętokrzyskie	102.97	16,477	160.02	2.24
gmina Pierzchnica	urban-rural	Kielce	Świętokrzyskie	104.7	4,692	44.81	-6.11
gmina Raków	rural	Kielce	Świętokrzyskie	190.62	5,576	29.25	-4.97
gmina Nowiny	rural	Kielce	Świętokrzyskie	45.61	7,919	173.62	6.09
gmina Strawczyn	rural	Kielce	Świętokrzyskie	85.86	10,950	127.53	10.66
gmina Zagnańsk	rural	Kielce	Świętokrzyskie	124.87	12,952	103.72	-0.69
gmina Fałków	rural	Końskie	Świętokrzyskie	132.37	4,375	33.05	-11.97
gmina Gowarczów	rural	Końskie	Świętokrzyskie	100.96	4,565	45.22	-6.27
gmina Końskie	urban-rural	Końskie	Świętokrzyskie	250.14	35,009	139.96	-7.55
gmina Radoszyce	urban-rural	Końskie	Świętokrzyskie	146.64	8,836	60.26	-7.25
gmina Ruda Maleniecka	rural	Końskie	Świętokrzyskie	110.05	3,057	27.78	-8.47
gmina Słupia Konecka	rural	Końskie	Świętokrzyskie	105.8	3,299	31.18	-8.74
gmina Smyków	rural	Końskie	Świętokrzyskie	62.09	3,787	60.99	-0.26
gmina Stąporków	urban-rural	Końskie	Świętokrzyskie	231.67	16,597	71.64	-12.9
gmina Baćkowice	rural	Opatów	Świętokrzyskie	96.13	4,864	50.6	-2.46
gmina Iwaniska	rural	Opatów	Świętokrzyskie	104.89	6,579	62.72	-8.96
gmina Lipnik	rural	Opatów	Świętokrzyskie	81.45	5,181	63.61	-10.46
gmina Opatów	urban-rural	Opatów	Świętokrzyskie	113.52	11,598	102.17	-7.17
gmina Ożarów	urban-rural	Opatów	Świętokrzyskie	183.29	10,604	57.85	-9.07
gmina Sadowie	rural	Opatów	Świętokrzyskie	81.81	3,895	47.61	-9.98
gmina Tarłów	rural	Opatów	Świętokrzyskie	163.35	5,110	31.28	-11.16
gmina Wojciechowice	rural	Opatów	Świętokrzyskie	86.46	4,003	46.3	-7.3
Ostrowiec Świętokrzyski	urban	Ostrowiec	Świętokrzyskie	46.43	67,975	1464.03	-10.45
gmina Bałtów	rural	Ostrowiec	Świętokrzyskie	105.07	3,375	32.12	-12.33
gmina Bodzechów	rural	Ostrowiec	Świętokrzyskie	122.19	13,296	108.81	-5.6
gmina Ćmielów	urban-rural	Ostrowiec	Świętokrzyskie	117.91	7,286	61.79	-6.64
gmina Kunów	urban-rural	Ostrowiec	Świętokrzyskie	113.56	9,740	85.77	-6.25
gmina Waśniów	rural	Ostrowiec	Świętokrzyskie	111.62	6,764	60.6	-7.86
gmina Działoszyce	urban-rural	Pińczów	Świętokrzyskie	105.76	4,868	46.03	-12.36
gmina Kije	rural	Pińczów	Świętokrzyskie	100.17	4,356	43.49	-7.98
gmina Michałów	rural	Pińczów	Świętokrzyskie	112.09	4,548	40.57	-5.8
gmina Pińczów	urban-rural	Pińczów	Świętokrzyskie	212.82	20,468	96.18	-8.72
gmina Złota	rural	Pińczów	Świętokrzyskie	82.01	4,451	54.27	-2.24
Sandomierz	urban	Sandomierz	Świętokrzyskie	28.69	23,238	809.97	-9.54
gmina Dwikozy	rural	Sandomierz	Świętokrzyskie	84.58	8,677	102.59	-6.18
gmina Klimontów	urban-rural	Sandomierz	Świętokrzyskie	99.78	7,997	80.15	-6.95
gmina Koprzywnica	urban-rural	Sandomierz	Świętokrzyskie	69.33	6,591	95.07	-7.62
gmina Łoniów	rural	Sandomierz	Świętokrzyskie	86.85	7,442	85.69	-3.6
gmina Obrazów	rural	Sandomierz	Świętokrzyskie	71.56	6,358	88.85	-6.98
gmina Samborzec	rural	Sandomierz	Świętokrzyskie	85.24	8,393	98.46	-6.74
gmina Wilczyce	rural	Sandomierz	Świętokrzyskie	69.56	3,667	52.72	-8.67
gmina Zawichost	urban-rural	Sandomierz	Świętokrzyskie	80.3	4,373	54.46	-12.92
Skarżysko-Kamienna	urban	Skarżysko	Świętokrzyskie	64.39	44,578	692.31	-11.91
gmina Bliżyn	rural	Skarżysko	Świętokrzyskie	141.2	8,016	56.77	-7.9
gmina Łączna	rural	Skarżysko	Świętokrzyskie	61.65	4,952	80.32	-12.66
gmina Skarżysko Kościelne	rural	Skarżysko	Świętokrzyskie	53.24	5,953	111.81	-10.85
gmina Suchedniów	urban-rural	Skarżysko	Świętokrzyskie	74.95	10,068	134.33	-8.72
Starachowice	urban	Starachowice	Świętokrzyskie	31.82	48,082	1511.06	-11.05
gmina Brody	rural	Starachowice	Świętokrzyskie	161.27	10,823	67.11	-5.18
gmina Mirzec	rural	Starachowice	Świętokrzyskie	111.11	8,254	74.29	-1.45
gmina Pawłów	rural	Starachowice	Świętokrzyskie	137.37	15,192	110.59	-1.16
gmina Wąchock	urban-rural	Starachowice	Świętokrzyskie	81.84	6,801	83.1	-3.79
gmina Bogoria	rural	Staszów	Świętokrzyskie	122.89	7,670	62.41	-7.32
gmina Łubnice	rural	Staszów	Świętokrzyskie	84.14	4,099	48.72	-2.19
gmina Oleśnica	urban-rural	Staszów	Świętokrzyskie	53.38	3,873	72.56	-0.86
gmina Osiek	urban-rural	Staszów	Świętokrzyskie	129.3	7,664	59.27	-3.88
gmina Połaniec	urban-rural	Staszów	Świętokrzyskie	75.01	11,711	156.13	-5.16
gmina Rytwiany	rural	Staszów	Świętokrzyskie	124.66	6,378	51.16	0.42
gmina Staszów	urban-rural	Staszów	Świętokrzyskie	227.52	25,534	112.23	-5.64
gmina Szydłów	urban-rural	Staszów	Świętokrzyskie	107.9	4,645	43.05	-6.03
gmina Kluczewsko	rural	Włoszczowa	Świętokrzyskie	136.87	5,186	37.89	-1.41
gmina Krasocin	rural	Włoszczowa	Świętokrzyskie	192.79	10,595	54.96	-2.44
gmina Moskorzew	rural	Włoszczowa	Świętokrzyskie	72.89	2,635	36.15	-12.94
gmina Radków	rural	Włoszczowa	Świętokrzyskie	88.1	2,500	28.38	-2.12
gmina Secemin	rural	Włoszczowa	Świętokrzyskie	162.6	4,783	29.42	-4.35
gmina Włoszczowa	urban-rural	Włoszczowa	Świętokrzyskie	254.61	19,234	75.54	-6.13
**Kielce**	urban	city with county rights	Świętokrzyskie	109.65	194,218	1771.25	-5.29
Bartoszyce	urban	Bartoszyce	Warmian-Masurian	11.79	23,156	1964.04	-10.93
Górowo Iławeckie	urban	Bartoszyce	Warmian-Masurian	3.32	3,921	1181.02	-10.24
gmina Bartoszyce	rural	Bartoszyce	Warmian-Masurian	427.21	10,643	24.91	-7.83
gmina Bisztynek	urban-rural	Bartoszyce	Warmian-Masurian	202.88	6,241	30.76	-11.07
gmina Górowo Iławeckie	rural	Bartoszyce	Warmian-Masurian	415.91	6,791	16.33	-10.24
gmina Sępopol	urban-rural	Bartoszyce	Warmian-Masurian	246.38	6,139	24.92	-11.51
Braniewo	urban	Braniewo	Warmian-Masurian	12.41	16,964	1366.96	-2.48
gmina Braniewo	rural	Braniewo	Warmian-Masurian	306.26	6,046	19.74	-5.94
gmina Frombork	urban-rural	Braniewo	Warmian-Masurian	124.1	3,542	28.54	-9.42
gmina Lelkowo	rural	Braniewo	Warmian-Masurian	198.16	2,794	14.1	-16.84
gmina Pieniężno	urban-rural	Braniewo	Warmian-Masurian	242.94	6,149	25.31	-11.86
gmina Płoskinia	rural	Braniewo	Warmian-Masurian	169.93	2,475	14.56	-8.86
gmina Wilczęta	rural	Braniewo	Warmian-Masurian	147.85	2,957	20	-11.24
Działdowo	urban	Działdowo	Warmian-Masurian	11.47	21,216	1849.69	-2.22
gmina Działdowo	rural	Działdowo	Warmian-Masurian	272.17	9,837	36.14	-1.39
gmina Iłowo-Osada	rural	Działdowo	Warmian-Masurian	103.77	7,179	69.18	-5.24
gmina Lidzbark	urban-rural	Działdowo	Warmian-Masurian	254.88	13,999	54.92	-9.51
gmina Płośnica	rural	Działdowo	Warmian-Masurian	163.23	5,555	34.03	-8.32
gmina Rybno	rural	Działdowo	Warmian-Masurian	148.41	7,180	48.38	-5.1
gmina Elbląg	rural	Elbląg	Warmian-Masurian	192.05	7,551	39.32	1.64
gmina Godkowo	rural	Elbląg	Warmian-Masurian	166.99	2,984	120.49	-17.05
gmina Gronowo Elbląskie	rural	Elbląg	Warmian-Masurian	89.15	5,126	57.5	-0.84
gmina Markusy	rural	Elbląg	Warmian-Masurian	109.6	4,043	36.89	-8.43
gmina Milejewo	rural	Elbląg	Warmian-Masurian	158.4	3,412	21.54	1.96
gmina Młynary	urban-rural	Elbląg	Warmian-Masurian	158.41	4,405	27.81	-6.28
gmina Pasłęk	urban-rural	Elbląg	Warmian-Masurian	263.91	19,236	72.89	-4.12
gmina Rychliki	rural	Elbląg	Warmian-Masurian	131.65	3,738	28.39	-13.28
gmina Tolkmicko	urban-rural	Elbląg	Warmian-Masurian	208.01	6,561	31.54	-10.74
Ełk	urban	Ełk	Warmian-Masurian	21.05	62,125	2951.31	4.81
gmina Ełk	rural	Ełk	Warmian-Masurian	379.18	11,890	31.36	14.1
gmina Kalinowo	rural	Ełk	Warmian-Masurian	284.46	6,653	23.39	-8.47
gmina Prostki	rural	Ełk	Warmian-Masurian	231.08	7,228	31.28	-8.7
gmina Stare Juchy	rural	Ełk	Warmian-Masurian	197.02	3,717	18.87	-11.48
Giżycko	urban	Giżycko	Warmian-Masurian	13.72	29,236	2130.9	-3.8
gmina Giżycko	rural	Giżycko	Warmian-Masurian	297.06	8,551	28.79	6.64
gmina Kruklanki	rural	Giżycko	Warmian-Masurian	201.57	3,122	15.49	-1.91
gmina Miłki	rural	Giżycko	Warmian-Masurian	169.63	3,709	21.87	-8.83
gmina Ryn	urban-rural	Giżycko	Warmian-Masurian	204.54	5,645	27.6	-7.33
gmina Wydminy	rural	Giżycko	Warmian-Masurian	232.99	6,202	26.62	-9.65
Iława	urban	Iława	Warmian-Masurian	21.88	33,315	1522.62	1.88
Lubawa	urban	Iława	Warmian-Masurian	16.84	10,390	616.98	3.88
gmina Iława	rural	Iława	Warmian-Masurian	424.21	12,997	30.64	3.07
gmina Kisielice	urban-rural	Iława	Warmian-Masurian	172.86	5,978	34.58	-4.86
gmina Lubawa	rural	Iława	Warmian-Masurian	236.45	10,709	45.29	-1.21
gmina Susz	urban-rural	Iława	Warmian-Masurian	259.05	12,687	48.98	-3.73
gmina Zalewo	urban-rural	Iława	Warmian-Masurian	253.93	6,750	26.58	-5.66
Kętrzyn	urban	Kętrzyn	Warmian-Masurian	10.35	26,988	2607.54	-5.68
gmina Barciany	rural	Kętrzyn	Warmian-Masurian	294.08	6,069	20.64	-13.78
gmina Kętrzyn	rural	Kętrzyn	Warmian-Masurian	285.36	8,201	28.74	-8.12
gmina Korsze	urban-rural	Kętrzyn	Warmian-Masurian	249.84	9,615	38.48	-10.75
gmina Reszel	urban-rural	Kętrzyn	Warmian-Masurian	179.2	7,457	41.61	-8.31
gmina Srokowo	rural	Kętrzyn	Warmian-Masurian	194.16	3,724	19.18	-16.12
Lidzbark Warmiński	urban	Lidzbark	Warmian-Masurian	14.35	15,628	1089.06	-7.87
gmina Kiwity	rural	Lidzbark	Warmian-Masurian	145.09	3,293	22.7	-4.22
gmina Lidzbark Warmiński	rural	Lidzbark	Warmian-Masurian	372.12	6,670	17.92	-7.05
gmina Lubomino	rural	Lidzbark	Warmian-Masurian	149.21	3,578	23.98	-2.96
gmina Orneta	urban-rural	Lidzbark	Warmian-Masurian	244.23	11,870	48.6	-8.29
Mrągowo	urban	Mrągowo	Warmian-Masurian	14.81	21,448	1448.21	-7.14
gmina Mikołajki	urban-rural	Mrągowo	Warmian-Masurian	256.3	8,125	31.7	-5.96
gmina Mrągowo	rural	Mrągowo	Warmian-Masurian	295.14	8,019	27.17	3.43
gmina Piecki	rural	Mrągowo	Warmian-Masurian	314.48	7,554	24.02	-6.27
gmina Sorkwity	rural	Mrągowo	Warmian-Masurian	184.65	4,514	24.45	-7.49
gmina Janowiec Kościelny	rural	Nidzica	Warmian-Masurian	135.92	3,184	23.43	-4.56
gmina Janowo	rural	Nidzica	Warmian-Masurian	191.66	2,640	13.77	-10.02
gmina Kozłowo	rural	Nidzica	Warmian-Masurian	254.27	5,957	23.43	-9.01
gmina Nidzica	urban-rural	Nidzica	Warmian-Masurian	378.79	20,972	55.37	-4.88
Nowe Miasto Lubawskie	urban	Nowe Miasto	Warmian-Masurian	11.37	10,832	952.68	-7.22
gmina Biskupiec	rural	Nowe Miasto	Warmian-Masurian	240.61	9,297	38.64	-5.64
gmina Grodziczno	rural	Nowe Miasto	Warmian-Masurian	154.37	6,264	40.58	-3.54
gmina Kurzętnik	rural	Nowe Miasto	Warmian-Masurian	149.11	9,109	61.09	0.51
gmina Nowe Miasto Lubawskie	rural	Nowe Miasto	Warmian-Masurian	138.47	8,267	59.7	3.33
gmina Kowale Oleckie	rural	Olecko	Warmian-Masurian	251.13	4,931	19.64	-12.46
gmina Olecko	urban-rural	Olecko	Warmian-Masurian	266.74	21,982	82.41	-1.39
gmina Świętajno	rural	Olecko	Warmian-Masurian	214.93	3,880	18.05	-10.02
gmina Wieliczki	rural	Olecko	Warmian-Masurian	140.8	3,257	23.13	-11.89
gmina Barczewo	urban-rural	Olsztyn	Warmian-Masurian	320.01	18,071	56.47	5.58
gmina Biskupiec	urban-rural	Olsztyn	Warmian-Masurian	290.41	18,962	65.29	-1.54
gmina Dobre Miasto	urban-rural	Olsztyn	Warmian-Masurian	258.69	15,810	61.12	-5.01
gmina Dywity	rural	Olsztyn	Warmian-Masurian	161.16	12,098	75.07	18.43
gmina Gietrzwałd	rural	Olsztyn	Warmian-Masurian	172.33	6,710	38.94	6.34
gmina Jeziorany	urban-rural	Olsztyn	Warmian-Masurian	211.49	7,638	36.12	-7.61
gmina Jonkowo	rural	Olsztyn	Warmian-Masurian	168.69	7,458	44.21	8.96
gmina Kolno	rural	Olsztyn	Warmian-Masurian	178.59	3,121	17.48	-14.12
gmina Olsztynek	urban-rural	Olsztyn	Warmian-Masurian	371.51	13,686	36.84	-4.7
gmina Purda	rural	Olsztyn	Warmian-Masurian	318.12	8,720	27.41	5.02
gmina Stawiguda	rural	Olsztyn	Warmian-Masurian	222.87	10,929	49.04	78.54
gmina Świątki	rural	Olsztyn	Warmian-Masurian	164.15	4,002	24.38	-13.53
Ostróda	urban	Ostróda	Warmian-Masurian	14.15	32,816	2319.15	-4.03
gmina Dąbrówno	rural	Ostróda	Warmian-Masurian	165.74	4,278	25.81	-6.38
gmina Grunwald	rural	Ostróda	Warmian-Masurian	179.94	5,592	31.08	-7.05
gmina Łukta	rural	Ostróda	Warmian-Masurian	186.46	4,445	23.84	-6.07
gmina Małdyty	rural	Ostróda	Warmian-Masurian	188.86	6,245	33.07	-2.18
gmina Miłakowo	urban-rural	Ostróda	Warmian-Masurian	95.81	5,387	56.23	-11.72
gmina Miłomłyn	urban-rural	Ostróda	Warmian-Masurian	160.6	4,894	30.47	-9.29
gmina Morąg	urban-rural	Ostróda	Warmian-Masurian	311.25	24,131	77.53	-6.45
gmina Ostróda	rural	Ostróda	Warmian-Masurian	400.89	16,107	40.18	1.18
gmina Biała Piska	urban-rural	Pisz	Warmian-Masurian	420.33	11,565	27.51	-8.86
gmina Orzysz	urban-rural	Pisz	Warmian-Masurian	362.57	8,827	24.35	-12.16
gmina Pisz	urban-rural	Pisz	Warmian-Masurian	633.7	27,616	43.58	-3.36
gmina Ruciane-Nida	urban-rural	Pisz	Warmian-Masurian	357.98	7,944	22.19	-10.48
Szczytno	urban	Szczytno	Warmian-Masurian	10.62	23,026	2168.17	-9.54
gmina Dźwierzuty	rural	Szczytno	Warmian-Masurian	263.34	6,459	24.53	-9.52
gmina Jedwabno	rural	Szczytno	Warmian-Masurian	311.9	3,619	11.6	-4.29
gmina Pasym	urban-rural	Szczytno	Warmian-Masurian	149.2	5,303	35.54	-6.82
gmina Rozogi	rural	Szczytno	Warmian-Masurian	224.41	5,509	24.55	-6.98
gmina Szczytno	rural	Szczytno	Warmian-Masurian	346.24	13,164	38.02	9.6
gmina Świętajno	rural	Szczytno	Warmian-Masurian	279.55	5,737	20.52	-11.41
gmina Wielbark	urban-rural	Szczytno	Warmian-Masurian	347.95	6,446	18.53	-5.83
gmina Banie Mazurskie	rural	Gołdap	Warmian-Masurian	204.96	3,648	17.8	-11.08
gmina Dubeninki	rural	Gołdap	Warmian-Masurian	205.29	2,857	13.92	-15.38
gmina Gołdap	urban-rural	Gołdap	Warmian-Masurian	362.04	20,120	8.24	-3.34
gmina Budry	rural	Węgorzewo	Warmian-Masurian	174.97	2,772	15.84	-13.8
gmina Pozezdrze	rural	Węgorzewo	Warmian-Masurian	176.78	3,220	18.21	-8.55
gmina Węgorzewo	urban-rural	Węgorzewo	Warmian-Masurian	341.47	16,563	48.5	-8.62
**Elbląg**	urban	city with county rights	Warmian-Masurian	79.82	119,097	1492.07	-5.4
**Olsztyn**	urban	city with county rights	Warmian-Masurian	88.33	171,853	1945.58	-2.16
Chodzież	urban	Chodzież	Greater Poland	12.77	18,416	1442.13	-10.82
gmina Budzyń	urban-rural	Chodzież	Greater Poland	209.09	8,492	40.61	1.1
gmina Chodzież	rural	Chodzież	Greater Poland	212.94	6,128	28.78	8.3
gmina Margonin	urban-rural	Chodzież	Greater Poland	123.13	6,449	52.38	3.64
gmina Szamocin	urban-rural	Chodzież	Greater Poland	127.13	7,470	58.76	-3.28
Czarnków	urban	Czarnków-Trzcianka	Greater Poland	10.17	10,547	1037.07	-8.79
gmina Czarnków	rural	Czarnków-Trzcianka	Greater Poland	345.77	11,439	33.08	-0.26
gmina Drawsko	rural	Czarnków-Trzcianka	Greater Poland	163.03	5,768	35.38	-6.78
gmina Krzyż Wielkopolski	urban-rural	Czarnków-Trzcianka	Greater Poland	174.28	8,668	49.74	-3.32
gmina Lubasz	rural	Czarnków-Trzcianka	Greater Poland	167.27	7,715	46.12	-1.55
gmina Połajewo	rural	Czarnków-Trzcianka	Greater Poland	141.46	6,163	43.57	-2.69
gmina Trzcianka	urban-rural	Czarnków-Trzcianka	Greater Poland	373.98	24,311	65.01	-0.82
gmina Wieleń	urban-rural	Czarnków-Trzcianka	Greater Poland	430.09	12,257	28.5	-7.95
Gniezno	urban	Gniezno	Greater Poland	40.6	67,968	1674.09	-5.6
gmina Czerniejewo	urban-rural	Gniezno	Greater Poland	111.94	7,433	66.4	4.66
gmina Gniezno	rural	Gniezno	Greater Poland	178.16	12,434	69.79	27.24
gmina Kiszkowo	rural	Gniezno	Greater Poland	114.49	5,450	47.6	2.71
gmina Kłecko	urban-rural	Gniezno	Greater Poland	131.93	7,449	56.46	-5.49
gmina Łubowo	rural	Gniezno	Greater Poland	113.54	6,766	59.59	13.36
gmina Mieleszyn	rural	Gniezno	Greater Poland	98.91	4,044	40.89	0.5
gmina Niechanowo	rural	Gniezno	Greater Poland	105.56	5,986	56.71	6.66
gmina Trzemeszno	urban-rural	Gniezno	Greater Poland	175.3	14,277	81.44	-2.12
gmina Witkowo	urban-rural	Gniezno	Greater Poland	184.6	13,586	73.6	-2.34
gmina Borek Wielkopolski	urban-rural	Gostyń	Greater Poland	127.64	7,446	58.34	-3.07
gmina Gostyń	urban-rural	Gostyń	Greater Poland	137.28	28,274	205.96	2.95
gmina Krobia	urban-rural	Gostyń	Greater Poland	129.54	12,968	100.11	-3.37
gmina Pępowo	rural	Gostyń	Greater Poland	86.59	5,948	68.69	-2.01
gmina Piaski	rural	Gostyń	Greater Poland	100.73	8,623	85.61	0.35
gmina Pogorzela	urban-rural	Gostyń	Greater Poland	96.54	4,910	50.86	-8.54
gmina Poniec	urban-rural	Gostyń	Greater Poland	131.93	7,738	58.65	-2.36
gmina Granowo	rural	Grodzisk	Greater Poland	66.87	5,069	75.8	0.59
gmina Grodzisk Wielkopolski	urban-rural	Grodzisk	Greater Poland	132.59	20,107	151.65	4.31
gmina Kamieniec	rural	Grodzisk	Greater Poland	133.82	6,625	49.51	-3.55
gmina Rakoniewice	urban-rural	Grodzisk	Greater Poland	201.01	13,215	65.74	2.18
gmina Wielichowo	urban-rural	Grodzisk	Greater Poland	107.58	6,924	64.36	6.29
gmina Jaraczewo	urban-rural	Jarocin	Greater Poland	133.09	8,130	61.09	-6.04
gmina Jarocin	urban-rural	Jarocin	Greater Poland	200.13	45,724	228.47	1.09
gmina Kotlin	rural	Jarocin	Greater Poland	83.92	7,421	88.43	-2.73
gmina Żerków	urban-rural	Jarocin	Greater Poland	170.15	10,232	60.14	-4.71
gmina Blizanów	rural	Kalisz	Greater Poland	157.52	9,947	63.15	2.73
gmina Brzeziny	rural	Kalisz	Greater Poland	126.95	5,818	45.83	-2
gmina Ceków-Kolonia	rural	Kalisz	Greater Poland	88.31	4,746	53.74	-2.59
gmina Godziesze Wielkie	rural	Kalisz	Greater Poland	105.4	9,642	91.48	10.09
gmina Koźminek	urban-rural	Kalisz	Greater Poland	88.65	7,564	85.32	0.71
gmina Lisków	rural	Kalisz	Greater Poland	75.5	5,178	68.58	-7.55
gmina Mycielin	rural	Kalisz	Greater Poland	110.89	4,869	43.91	-2.86
gmina Opatówek	urban-rural	Kalisz	Greater Poland	104.27	10,808	103.65	-0.92
gmina Stawiszyn	urban-rural	Kalisz	Greater Poland	78.5	7,128	90.8	-3.67
gmina Szczytniki	rural	Kalisz	Greater Poland	110.33	7,798	70.68	-1.96
gmina Żelazków	rural	Kalisz	Greater Poland	113.67	9,537	83.9	3.48
gmina Baranów	rural	Kępno	Greater Poland	74.41	7,980	107.24	2.81
gmina Bralin	rural	Kępno	Greater Poland	85.35	6,107	71.55	0.44
gmina Kępno	urban-rural	Kępno	Greater Poland	123.87	24,473	197.57	-1.18
gmina Łęka Opatowska	rural	Kępno	Greater Poland	77.71	5,342	68.74	2.57
gmina Perzów	rural	Kępno	Greater Poland	75.33	3,774	50.1	0.53
gmina Rychtal	rural	Kępno	Greater Poland	96.55	3,803	39.39	-6.92
gmina Trzcinica	rural	Kępno	Greater Poland	75.04	4,949	65.95	1.96
Koło	urban	Koło	Greater Poland	13.85	21,526	1554.22	-11.79
gmina Babiak	rural	Koło	Greater Poland	133.77	7,815	58.42	-6.48
gmina Chodów	rural	Koło	Greater Poland	77.79	2,991	38.45	-13.13
gmina Dąbie	urban-rural	Koło	Greater Poland	130.35	6,273	48.12	-8.46
gmina Grzegorzew	rural	Koło	Greater Poland	73.33	5,681	77.47	0.71
gmina Kłodawa	urban-rural	Koło	Greater Poland	128.93	12,770	99.05	-6.87
gmina Koło	rural	Koło	Greater Poland	102.58	7,808	76.12	4.7
gmina Kościelec	rural	Koło	Greater Poland	104.64	6,869	65.64	1.46
gmina Olszówka	rural	Koło	Greater Poland	81.7	4,491	54.97	-5.36
gmina Osiek Mały	rural	Koło	Greater Poland	87.32	6,165	70.6	6.91
gmina Przedecz	urban-rural	Koło	Greater Poland	76.45	4,084	53.42	-9.92
gmina Golina	urban-rural	Konin	Greater Poland	98.97	12,078	122.04	2.44
gmina Grodziec	rural	Konin	Greater Poland	117.82	5,146	43.68	-5.26
gmina Kazimierz Biskupi	rural	Konin	Greater Poland	107.65	11,505	106.87	0.46
gmina Kleczew	urban-rural	Konin	Greater Poland	110.28	9,928	90.03	-0.8
gmina Kramsk	rural	Konin	Greater Poland	132.04	11,290	85.5	6.19
gmina Krzymów	rural	Konin	Greater Poland	92.5	8,127	87.86	7.83
gmina Rychwał	urban-rural	Konin	Greater Poland	117.9	8,222	69.74	-5.1
gmina Rzgów	rural	Konin	Greater Poland	104.66	7,257	69.34	1.66
gmina Skulsk	rural	Konin	Greater Poland	84.89	6,114	72.02	-2.33
gmina Sompolno	urban-rural	Konin	Greater Poland	137.42	10,367	75.44	-1.41
gmina Stare Miasto	rural	Konin	Greater Poland	97.73	12,467	127.57	10.23
gmina Ślesin	urban-rural	Konin	Greater Poland	145.63	14,062	96.56	2.17
gmina Wierzbinek	rural	Konin	Greater Poland	147.55	7,253	49.16	-7.83
gmina Wilczyn	rural	Konin	Greater Poland	83.2	6,189	74.39	-4.22
Kościan	urban	Kościan	Greater Poland	9.01	23,830	2644.84	-1.14
gmina Czempiń	urban-rural	Kościan	Greater Poland	142.19	11,510	80.95	0.23
gmina Kościan	rural	Kościan	Greater Poland	202.5	16,199	80	3.61
gmina Krzywiń	urban-rural	Kościan	Greater Poland	178.95	9,996	55.86	-2.06
gmina Śmigiel	urban-rural	Kościan	Greater Poland	189.77	17,579	92.63	-2.96
Sulmierzyce	urban	Krotoszyn	Greater Poland	29.29	2,844	97.1	-4.64
gmina Kobylin	urban-rural	Krotoszyn	Greater Poland	112.1	8,079	72.07	-1.89
gmina Koźmin Wielkopolski	urban-rural	Krotoszyn	Greater Poland	152.42	13,190	86.54	-5.55
gmina Krotoszyn	urban-rural	Krotoszyn	Greater Poland	255.8	40,333	157.67	-2.23
gmina Rozdrażew	rural	Krotoszyn	Greater Poland	79.2	5,180	65.4	-2.24
gmina Zduny	urban-rural	Krotoszyn	Greater Poland	84.87	7,556	89.03	1.77
gmina Krzemieniewo	rural	Leszno	Greater Poland	113.19	8,286	73.2	-4.82
gmina Lipno	rural	Leszno	Greater Poland	103.85	8,514	81.98	29.54
gmina Osieczna	urban-rural	Leszno	Greater Poland	128.64	9,305	72.33	6.39
gmina Rydzyna	urban-rural	Leszno	Greater Poland	135.6	9,744	71.86	20.74
gmina Święciechowa	rural	Leszno	Greater Poland	134.94	8,166	60.52	10.55
gmina Wijewo	rural	Leszno	Greater Poland	61.84	3,833	61.98	1.83
gmina Włoszakowice	rural	Leszno	Greater Poland	127.75	9,696	75.9	8.28
gmina Chrzypsko Wielkie	rural	Międzychód	Greater Poland	84.52	3,302	39.07	-2.11
gmina Kwilcz	rural	Międzychód	Greater Poland	141.76	6,337	44.7	-3.03
gmina Międzychód	urban-rural	Międzychód	Greater Poland	307.04	18,361	59.8	-3.17
gmina Sieraków	urban-rural	Międzychód	Greater Poland	203.12	8,686	42.76	-3.47
gmina Kuślin	rural	Nowy Tomyśl	Greater Poland	106.48	5,498	51.63	-1.09
gmina Lwówek	urban-rural	Nowy Tomyśl	Greater Poland	183.54	9,063	49.38	-7.14
gmina Miedzichowo	rural	Nowy Tomyśl	Greater Poland	208.25	3,700	17.77	2.17
gmina Nowy Tomyśl	urban-rural	Nowy Tomyśl	Greater Poland	186.45	27,161	145.67	8.03
gmina Opalenica	urban-rural	Nowy Tomyśl	Greater Poland	148.91	16,418	110.25	0.79
gmina Zbąszyń	urban-rural	Nowy Tomyśl	Greater Poland	179.99	13,835	76.87	4.08
gmina Oborniki	urban-rural	Oborniki	Greater Poland	340.04	34,183	100.53	0.92
gmina Rogoźno	urban-rural	Oborniki	Greater Poland	216.24	18,356	84.89	2.68
gmina Ryczywół	rural	Oborniki	Greater Poland	154.76	7,287	47.09	-3.81
Ostrów Wielkopolski	urban	Ostrów	Greater Poland	41.9	71,829	1714.3	-2.69
gmina Nowe Skalmierzyce	urban-rural	Ostrów	Greater Poland	125.42	15,612	124.48	5.09
gmina Odolanów	urban-rural	Ostrów	Greater Poland	136.09	14,683	107.89	2.9
gmina Ostrów Wielkopolski	rural	Ostrów	Greater Poland	207.86	19,149	92.12	0.84
gmina Przygodzice	rural	Ostrów	Greater Poland	163.39	12,192	74.62	4.61
gmina Raszków	urban-rural	Ostrów	Greater Poland	134.57	11,872	88.22	-0.22
gmina Sieroszewice	rural	Ostrów	Greater Poland	163.17	9,665	59.23	-0.48
gmina Sośnie	rural	Ostrów	Greater Poland	187.72	6,579	35.05	-0.46
gmina Czajków	rural	Ostrzeszów	Greater Poland	70.74	2,497	35.3	1.47
gmina Doruchów	rural	Ostrzeszów	Greater Poland	99.38	5,384	54.18	4.69
gmina Grabów nad Prosną	urban-rural	Ostrzeszów	Greater Poland	123.8	7,801	63.01	-0.94
gmina Kobyla Góra	rural	Ostrzeszów	Greater Poland	129.21	6,138	47.5	-1.95
gmina Kraszewice	rural	Ostrzeszów	Greater Poland	74.93	3,630	48.45	1.84
gmina Mikstat	urban-rural	Ostrzeszów	Greater Poland	87.18	6,027	69.13	-1.27
gmina Ostrzeszów	urban-rural	Ostrzeszów	Greater Poland	187.39	23,959	127.86	0.47
Piła	urban	Piła	Greater Poland	102.68	72,949	710.45	-4.43
gmina Białośliwie	rural	Piła	Greater Poland	75.57	4,823	63.82	-6.62
gmina Kaczory	rural	Piła	Greater Poland	150.64	7,840	52.04	-2.07
gmina Łobżenica	urban-rural	Piła	Greater Poland	190.78	9,481	49.7	-5.22
gmina Miasteczko Krajeńskie	rural	Piła	Greater Poland	70.91	3,159	44.55	-8.61
gmina Szydłowo	rural	Piła	Greater Poland	267.46	9,278	34.69	15.33
gmina Ujście	urban-rural	Piła	Greater Poland	128.13	7,954	62.08	-1.55
gmina Wyrzysk	urban-rural	Piła	Greater Poland	159.05	13,925	87.55	-3.09
gmina Wysoka	urban-rural	Piła	Greater Poland	122.99	6,519	53	-9.38
gmina Chocz	urban-rural	Pleszew	Greater Poland	73.63	4,752	64.54	-0.63
gmina Czermin	rural	Pleszew	Greater Poland	98.09	4,953	50.49	1.62
gmina Dobrzyca	urban-rural	Pleszew	Greater Poland	116.71	8,093	69.34	-6.34
gmina Gizałki	rural	Pleszew	Greater Poland	108.43	4,593	42.36	-4.1
gmina Gołuchów	rural	Pleszew	Greater Poland	135.88	10,789	79.4	6.42
gmina Pleszew	urban-rural	Pleszew	Greater Poland	180.33	29,782	165.15	-2.76
Luboń	urban	Poznań	Greater Poland	13.51	31,975	2366.77	5.35
Puszczykowo	urban	Poznań	Greater Poland	16.39	9,631	587.61	-2.41
gmina Buk	urban-rural	Poznań	Greater Poland	90.58	12,664	139.81	5.64
gmina Czerwonak	rural	Poznań	Greater Poland	82.48	27,697	335.8	4.16
gmina Dopiewo	rural	Poznań	Greater Poland	108.02	28,770	266.34	46.21
gmina Kleszczewo	rural	Poznań	Greater Poland	74.46	9,104	122.27	49.79
gmina Komorniki	rural	Poznań	Greater Poland	66.41	31,136	468.85	41.76
gmina Kostrzyn	urban-rural	Poznań	Greater Poland	154.81	18,610	120.21	10.7
gmina Kórnik	urban-rural	Poznań	Greater Poland	186.12	30,379	163.22	50.33
gmina Mosina	urban-rural	Poznań	Greater Poland	171.43	33,642	196.24	16.84
gmina Murowana Goślina	urban-rural	Poznań	Greater Poland	172.23	16,922	98.25	2.14
gmina Pobiedziska	urban-rural	Poznań	Greater Poland	189.58	19,886	104.9	9.2
gmina Rokietnica	rural	Poznań	Greater Poland	79.3	18,973	239.26	45.8
gmina Stęszew	urban-rural	Poznań	Greater Poland	175.02	15,148	86.55	3.55
gmina Suchy Las	rural	Poznań	Greater Poland	116.01	18,407	158.67	28.05
gmina Swarzędz	urban-rural	Poznań	Greater Poland	101.78	51,929	510.21	17.72
gmina Tarnowo Podgórne	rural	Poznań	Greater Poland	101.75	28,544	280.53	33.34
gmina Bojanowo	urban-rural	Rawicz	Greater Poland	123.5	8,730	70.69	-3.53
gmina Jutrosin	urban-rural	Rawicz	Greater Poland	114.87	7,051	61.38	-4.68
gmina Miejska Górka	urban-rural	Rawicz	Greater Poland	103.48	9,222	89.12	-4.16
gmina Pakosław	rural	Rawicz	Greater Poland	77.5	4,919	63.47	9.04
gmina Rawicz	urban-rural	Rawicz	Greater Poland	134.17	30,311	225.91	0.26
Słupca	urban	Słupca	Greater Poland	10.3	13,619	1322.23	-5.3
gmina Lądek	rural	Słupca	Greater Poland	98.58	5,753	58.36	-2.59
gmina Orchowo	rural	Słupca	Greater Poland	98.03	3,789	38.65	-3.93
gmina Ostrowite	rural	Słupca	Greater Poland	103.55	5,051	48.78	-6.64
gmina Powidz	rural	Słupca	Greater Poland	80.69	2,315	28.69	2.46
gmina Słupca	rural	Słupca	Greater Poland	144.81	9,284	64.11	2.93
gmina Strzałkowo	rural	Słupca	Greater Poland	142.34	10,285	72.26	-2.45
gmina Zagórów	urban-rural	Słupca	Greater Poland	159.71	8,933	55.93	-3.48
Obrzycko	urban	Szamotuły	Greater Poland	3.74	2,369	633.42	-0.98
gmina Duszniki	rural	Szamotuły	Greater Poland	156.3	9,137	58.46	10.7
gmina Kaźmierz	rural	Szamotuły	Greater Poland	127.9	8,799	68.8	16.28
gmina Obrzycko	rural	Szamotuły	Greater Poland	110.84	4,473	40.36	-4.58
gmina Ostroróg	urban-rural	Szamotuły	Greater Poland	84.8	4,928	58.11	-5.02
gmina Pniewy	urban-rural	Szamotuły	Greater Poland	158.47	12,680	80.02	3.04
gmina Szamotuły	urban-rural	Szamotuły	Greater Poland	175.52	30,256	172.38	4.21
gmina Wronki	urban-rural	Szamotuły	Greater Poland	301.72	19,078	63.23	0.66
gmina Dominowo	rural	Środa	Greater Poland	79.36	3,114	39.24	11.05
gmina Krzykosy	rural	Środa	Greater Poland	110.72	7,153	64.6	8.48
gmina Nowe Miasto nad Wartą	rural	Środa	Greater Poland	120.07	9,032	75.22	-3.26
gmina Środa Wielkopolska	urban-rural	Środa	Greater Poland	207.16	32,784	158.25	8.31
gmina Zaniemyśl	rural	Środa	Greater Poland	106.55	6,950	65.23	5.68
gmina Brodnica	rural	Śrem	Greater Poland	95.83	4,890	51.03	-1.16
gmina Dolsk	urban-rural	Śrem	Greater Poland	124.48	5,899	47.39	0.85
gmina Książ Wielkopolski	urban-rural	Śrem	Greater Poland	147.92	8,470	57.26	-4.49
gmina Śrem	urban-rural	Śrem	Greater Poland	205.87	42,196	204.96	2.64
Turek	urban	Turek	Greater Poland	16.17	26,704	1651.45	-8.24
gmina Brudzew	rural	Turek	Greater Poland	112.63	5,972	53.02	3.03
gmina Dobra	urban-rural	Turek	Greater Poland	131.8	6,108	46.34	-5.02
gmina Kawęczyn	rural	Turek	Greater Poland	101.05	5,173	51.19	-2.18
gmina Malanów	rural	Turek	Greater Poland	107.23	6,570	61.27	-0.41
gmina Przykona	rural	Turek	Greater Poland	110.92	4,598	41.45	9.68
gmina Tuliszków	urban-rural	Turek	Greater Poland	149.66	10,542	70.44	-2.86
gmina Turek	rural	Turek	Greater Poland	109.25	10,055	92.04	13.45
gmina Władysławów	rural	Turek	Greater Poland	90.72	8,096	89.24	-3.76
Wągrowiec	urban	Wągrowiec	Greater Poland	17.83	25,685	1440.55	2.79
gmina Damasławek	rural	Wągrowiec	Greater Poland	104.54	5,306	50.76	-8.34
gmina Gołańcz	urban-rural	Wągrowiec	Greater Poland	191.82	8,252	43.02	-4.4
gmina Mieścisko	rural	Wągrowiec	Greater Poland	135.06	5,940	43.98	-4.34
gmina Skoki	urban-rural	Wągrowiec	Greater Poland	198.49	9,768	49.21	10.03
gmina Wapno	rural	Wągrowiec	Greater Poland	44.06	2,946	66.86	-7.47
gmina Wągrowiec	rural	Wągrowiec	Greater Poland	347.85	12,319	35.41	2.99
gmina Przemęt	rural	Wolsztyn	Greater Poland	225.14	14,162	62.9	1.35
gmina Siedlec	rural	Wolsztyn	Greater Poland	204.64	12,775	62.43	2.31
gmina Wolsztyn	urban-rural	Wolsztyn	Greater Poland	249.95	30,597	122.41	0.57
gmina Kołaczkowo	rural	Września	Greater Poland	115.92	5,999	51.75	-4.79
gmina Miłosław	urban-rural	Września	Greater Poland	132.12	10,164	76.93	-6.7
gmina Nekla	urban-rural	Września	Greater Poland	95.86	7,577	79.04	5.61
gmina Pyzdry	urban-rural	Września	Greater Poland	137.82	6,919	50.2	-7.26
gmina Września	urban-rural	Września	Greater Poland	221.85	47,430	213.79	8.58
Złotów	urban	Złotów	Greater Poland	11.58	18,513	1598.7	0.4
gmina Jastrowie	urban-rural	Złotów	Greater Poland	353.12	11,463	32.46	-3.87
gmina Krajenka	urban-rural	Złotów	Greater Poland	191.18	7,511	39.29	-1.95
gmina Lipka	rural	Złotów	Greater Poland	191.18	5,500	28.77	-6.87
gmina Okonek	urban-rural	Złotów	Greater Poland	325.99	8,446	25.91	-9.83
gmina Tarnówka	rural	Złotów	Greater Poland	132.45	3,000	22.65	-6.69
gmina Zakrzewo	rural	Złotów	Greater Poland	162.39	4,900	30.17	-3.71
gmina Złotów	rural	Złotów	Greater Poland	292.28	9,949	34.04	3.54
**Kalisz**	urban	city with county rights	Greater Poland	69.42	99,761	1437.06	-7.05
**Konin**	urban	city with county rights	Greater Poland	82.31	73,176	889.03	-8.51
**Leszno**	urban	city with county rights	Greater Poland	31.86	63,323	1987.54	-4.01
**Poznań**	urban	city with county rights	Greater Poland	261.91	533,830	2038.22	-3.55
Białogard	urban	Białogard	West Pomeranian	25.73	24,049	934.67	-4.19
gmina Białogard	rural	Białogard	West Pomeranian	328.25	7,538	22.96	-8.35
gmina Karlino	urban-rural	Białogard	West Pomeranian	141.03	9,127	64.72	-3.77
gmina Tychowo	urban-rural	Białogard	West Pomeranian	350.45	6,720	19.18	-5.3
gmina Bierzwnik	rural	Choszczno	West Pomeranian	239.06	4,658	19.48	-5.59
gmina Choszczno	urban-rural	Choszczno	West Pomeranian	246.31	21,544	87.47	-5.22
gmina Drawno	urban-rural	Choszczno	West Pomeranian	320.91	5,010	15.61	-7.28
gmina Krzęcin	rural	Choszczno	West Pomeranian	140.26	3,649	26.02	-11.6
gmina Pełczyce	urban-rural	Choszczno	West Pomeranian	200.72	7,743	38.58	-7.55
gmina Recz	urban-rural	Choszczno	West Pomeranian	180.37	5,431	30.11	-11.63
gmina Czaplinek	urban-rural	Drawsko	West Pomeranian	364.84	11,855	32.49	-2.52
gmina Drawsko Pomorskie	urban-rural	Drawsko	West Pomeranian	409.49	17,076	41.7	-11.23
gmina Kalisz Pomorski	urban-rural	Drawsko	West Pomeranian	480.87	7,359	15.3	-1.81
gmina Wierzchowo	rural	Drawsko	West Pomeranian	229.19	4,225	18.43	-7.54
gmina Złocieniec	urban-rural	Drawsko	West Pomeranian	279.85	16,327	58.34	-7.12
gmina Goleniów	urban-rural	Goleniów	West Pomeranian	442.8	36,125	81.58	2.23
gmina Maszewo	urban-rural	Goleniów	West Pomeranian	210.35	8,763	41.66	-2.35
gmina Nowogard	urban-rural	Goleniów	West Pomeranian	338.67	24,600	72.64	-2.16
gmina Osina	rural	Goleniów	West Pomeranian	101.66	3,037	29.87	-2.29
gmina Przybiernów	rural	Goleniów	West Pomeranian	228.87	4,998	21.84	-6.19
gmina Stepnica	urban-rural	Goleniów	West Pomeranian	293.13	4,873	16.62	-3.8
gmina Brojce	rural	Gryfice	West Pomeranian	117.97	3,706	31.41	-7.7
gmina Gryfice	urban-rural	Gryfice	West Pomeranian	261.3	23,675	90.6	-3.76
gmina Karnice	rural	Gryfice	West Pomeranian	133.12	3,972	29.84	-7.68
gmina Płoty	urban-rural	Gryfice	West Pomeranian	239.19	8,758	36.62	-6.72
gmina Rewal	rural	Gryfice	West Pomeranian	40.65	3,871	95.23	-0.86
gmina Trzebiatów	urban-rural	Gryfice	West Pomeranian	225.14	16,043	71.26	-7.33
gmina Banie	rural	Gryfino	West Pomeranian	206.3	6,282	30.45	-6.18
gmina Cedynia	urban-rural	Gryfino	West Pomeranian	180.61	4,192	23.21	-10.2
gmina Chojna	urban-rural	Gryfino	West Pomeranian	332.3	13,667	41.13	-5.14
gmina Gryfino	urban-rural	Gryfino	West Pomeranian	253.9	31,752	125.06	-4.4
gmina Mieszkowice	urban-rural	Gryfino	West Pomeranian	238.65	7,006	29.36	-12.48
gmina Moryń	urban-rural	Gryfino	West Pomeranian	124.57	4,258	34.18	-5.34
gmina Stare Czarnowo	rural	Gryfino	West Pomeranian	152.88	3,807	24.9	-0.44
gmina Trzcińsko-Zdrój	urban-rural	Gryfino	West Pomeranian	170.45	5,234	30.71	-10.48
gmina Widuchowa	rural	Gryfino	West Pomeranian	209.45	5,400	25.78	-5.19
gmina Dziwnów	urban-rural	Kamień	West Pomeranian	37.62	3,945	104.86	-3.11
gmina Golczewo	urban-rural	Kamień	West Pomeranian	175.31	5,851	33.38	-4.01
gmina Kamień Pomorski	urban-rural	Kamień	West Pomeranian	208.54	14,313	68.63	0.82
gmina Międzyzdroje	urban-rural	Kamień	West Pomeranian	114.38	6,424	56.16	-5.69
gmina Świerzno	rural	Kamień	West Pomeranian	140.13	4,223	30.14	-4.15
gmina Wolin	urban-rural	Kamień	West Pomeranian	327.46	12,105	36.97	-3.26
Kołobrzeg	urban	Kołobrzeg	West Pomeranian	25.67	46,271	1802.53	-1.84
gmina Dygowo	rural	Kołobrzeg	West Pomeranian	128.52	5,582	43.43	-2.73
gmina Gościno	urban-rural	Kołobrzeg	West Pomeranian	116	5,122	44.16	-3.17
gmina Kołobrzeg	rural	Kołobrzeg	West Pomeranian	144.03	10,975	76.2	7.21
gmina Rymań	rural	Kołobrzeg	West Pomeranian	146.15	3,922	26.84	-7.29
gmina Siemyśl	rural	Kołobrzeg	West Pomeranian	107.31	3,856	35.93	7.46
gmina Ustronie Morskie	rural	Kołobrzeg	West Pomeranian	56.98	3,671	64.43	-2.26
gmina Będzino	rural	Koszalin	West Pomeranian	166.19	8,655	52.08	2.28
gmina Biesiekierz	rural	Koszalin	West Pomeranian	116.6	7,176	61.54	20.36
gmina Bobolice	urban-rural	Koszalin	West Pomeranian	367.56	8,856	24.09	-13.19
gmina Manowo	rural	Koszalin	West Pomeranian	188.31	6,950	36.91	2.17
gmina Mielno	urban-rural	Koszalin	West Pomeranian	62.13	4,928	79.32	-2.69
gmina Polanów	urban-rural	Koszalin	West Pomeranian	393.35	8,558	21.76	-11.31
gmina Sianów	urban-rural	Koszalin	West Pomeranian	226.76	13,856	61.1	1.42
gmina Świeszyno	rural	Koszalin	West Pomeranian	132.56	7,486	56.47	20.35
gmina Barlinek	urban-rural	Myślibórz	West Pomeranian	258.72	19,203	74.22	-6
gmina Boleszkowice	rural	Myślibórz	West Pomeranian	130.49	2,831	21.7	-5.7
gmina Dębno	urban-rural	Myślibórz	West Pomeranian	318.43	20,432	64.16	-6.54
gmina Myślibórz	urban-rural	Myślibórz	West Pomeranian	328.86	19,615	59.65	-9.31
gmina Nowogródek Pomorski	rural	Myślibórz	West Pomeranian	145.9	3,345	22.93	-1.89
gmina Dobra (Szczecińska)	rural	Police	West Pomeranian	110.28	24,749	224.42	40.74
gmina Kołbaskowo	rural	Police	West Pomeranian	105.46	13,609	129.04	27.95
gmina Nowe Warpno	urban-rural	Police	West Pomeranian	197.88	1,626	8.22	-7.67
gmina Police	urban-rural	Police	West Pomeranian	251.71	41,245	163.86	-2.73
gmina Bielice	rural	Pyrzyce	West Pomeranian	84.19	3,116	37.01	-0.32
gmina Kozielice	rural	Pyrzyce	West Pomeranian	94.53	2,462	26.04	-13.95
gmina Lipiany	urban-rural	Pyrzyce	West Pomeranian	94.91	5,809	61.21	-8.52
gmina Przelewice	rural	Pyrzyce	West Pomeranian	162.01	5,114	31.57	-7.58
gmina Pyrzyce	urban-rural	Pyrzyce	West Pomeranian	204.22	19,295	94.48	-4.64
gmina Warnice	rural	Pyrzyce	West Pomeranian	86.14	3,455	40.11	-3.64
Darłowo	urban	Sławno	West Pomeranian	20.21	13,657	675.75	-6.29
Sławno	urban	Sławno	West Pomeranian	15.83	12,432	785.34	-5.54
gmina Darłowo	rural	Sławno	West Pomeranian	269.45	7,960	29.54	-1.71
gmina Malechowo	rural	Sławno	West Pomeranian	226.46	6,239	27.55	-8.51
gmina Postomino	rural	Sławno	West Pomeranian	226.86	6,884	30.34	-4.23
gmina Sławno	rural	Sławno	West Pomeranian	284.39	8,838	31.08	-3.74
Stargard	urban	Stargard	West Pomeranian	48.08	67,753	1409.17	-2.76
gmina Chociwel	urban-rural	Stargard	West Pomeranian	160.82	5,797	36.05	-5.12
gmina Dobrzany	urban-rural	Stargard	West Pomeranian	134.72	4,774	35.44	-13.12
gmina Dolice	rural	Stargard	West Pomeranian	237.17	7,743	32.65	-9.17
gmina Ińsko	urban-rural	Stargard	West Pomeranian	151.01	3,339	22.11	-9.6
gmina Kobylanka	rural	Stargard	West Pomeranian	121.68	5,768	47.4	26.29
gmina Marianowo	rural	Stargard	West Pomeranian	101.94	3,102	30.43	-8.87
gmina Stara Dąbrowa	rural	Stargard	West Pomeranian	112.59	3,716	33	0
gmina Stargard	rural	Stargard	West Pomeranian	318.88	13,875	43.51	21.3
gmina Suchań	urban-rural	Stargard	West Pomeranian	133.05	4,284	32.2	-4.17
Szczecinek	urban	Szczecinek	West Pomeranian	48.48	39,885	822.71	-3.14
gmina Barwice	urban-rural	Szczecinek	West Pomeranian	258.52	8,458	32.72	-8.26
gmina Biały Bór	urban-rural	Szczecinek	West Pomeranian	269.93	5,268	19.52	-2.2
gmina Borne Sulinowo	urban-rural	Szczecinek	West Pomeranian	484.5	9,893	20.42	1.32
gmina Grzmiąca	rural	Szczecinek	West Pomeranian	205.12	4,651	22.67	-12.1
gmina Szczecinek	rural	Szczecinek	West Pomeranian	498.87	9,239	18.52	-3.4
Świdwin	urban	Świdwin	West Pomeranian	22.38	15,411	688.61	-2.39
gmina Brzeżno	rural	Świdwin	West Pomeranian	110.81	2,757	24.88	-7.39
gmina Połczyn-Zdrój	urban-rural	Świdwin	West Pomeranian	344.28	15,059	43.74	-9.34
gmina Rąbino	rural	Świdwin	West Pomeranian	179.68	3,515	19.56	-16.95
gmina Sławoborze	rural	Świdwin	West Pomeranian	188.66	3,984	21.12	-10.89
gmina Świdwin	rural	Świdwin	West Pomeranian	247.25	5,800	23.46	-7.97
Wałcz	urban	Wałcz	West Pomeranian	38.17	25,115	657.98	-7.23
gmina Człopa	urban-rural	Wałcz	West Pomeranian	349.05	4,871	13.96	-10.52
gmina Mirosławiec	urban-rural	Wałcz	West Pomeranian	203.35	5,391	26.51	-8.15
gmina Tuczno	urban-rural	Wałcz	West Pomeranian	249.5	4,891	19.6	-8.11
gmina Wałcz	rural	Wałcz	West Pomeranian	574.91	12,661	22.02	-0.71
gmina Dobra	urban-rural	Łobez	West Pomeranian	115.9	4,347	37.51	-10.44
gmina Łobez	urban-rural	Łobez	West Pomeranian	227.39	13,798	60.68	-10.57
gmina Radowo Małe	rural	Łobez	West Pomeranian	180.46	3,566	19.76	-8.27
gmina Resko	urban-rural	Łobez	West Pomeranian	285.2	7,941	27.84	-5.52
gmina Węgorzyno	urban-rural	Łobez	West Pomeranian	256.18	6,862	26.79	-10
**Koszalin**	urban	city with county rights	West Pomeranian	98.34	106,880	1086.84	-2.72
**Szczecin**	urban	city with county rights	West Pomeranian	300.6	400,990	1333.97	-2.82
**Świnoujście**	urban	city with county rights	West Pomeranian	197.23	40,864	207.19	-1.33
