= Straszewo =

Straszewo may refer to the following places:

- Straszewo, Greater Poland Voivodeship (west-central Poland)
  - Straszewo, Konin County
  - Straszewo, Wągrowiec
- Straszewo, Kuyavian-Pomeranian Voivodeship (north-central Poland)
- Straszewo, Podlaskie Voivodeship (north-east Poland)
- Straszewo, Pomeranian Voivodeship (north Poland)
