= Wójtówka =

Wójtówka may refer to the following places in Poland:

- Wójtówka, Lower Silesian Voivodeship (south-west Poland)
- Wójtówka, Gmina Bądkowo in Kuyavian-Pomeranian Voivodeship (north-central Poland)
- Wójtówka, Gmina Waganiec in Kuyavian-Pomeranian Voivodeship (north-central Poland)
- Wójtówka, Masovian Voivodeship (east-central Poland)
