= Sinki =

Sinki may refer to:

- Sinki, Gmina Bądkowo, a village in North-central Poland.
- Sinki, Gmina Zakrzewo, a village in North-central Poland.
- Sinki (food), a Nepalese dish.
