= Żabieniec =

Żabieniec may refer to the following places:

- Żabieniec, Kuyavian-Pomeranian Voivodeship (north-central Poland)
- Żabieniec, Garwolin County in Masovian Voivodeship (east-central Poland)
- Żabieniec, Piaseczno County in Masovian Voivodeship (east-central Poland)
- Żabieniec, Pruszków County in Masovian Voivodeship (east-central Poland)
- Żabieniec, Warmian-Masurian Voivodeship (north Poland)
