= Magdalena Kołodziejczak =

Polish politician and economist (born 1958)

- Kołodziejczak in 2026.

Member of the Sejm of Poland
- Incumbent
- Assumed office 13 November 2023
- Constituency: No. 25

Mayor of Pruszcz Gdański Municipality
- In office 14 November 2002 – 15 October 2023
- Preceded by: Daniel Matyja
- Succeeded by: Weronika Chmielowiec

Member of the Pruszcz Gdański Municipal Council
- In office 29 October 1998 – 10 November 2002
- Constituency: No. 3

Personal details
- Born: Magdalena Małgorzata Szulc; 19 June 1958 (age 68) Dąbrówka, Poland
- Party: Civic Coalition (since 2025)
- Other political affiliations: Yes! For Poland (since 2020); Civic Platform (until 2025)
- Children: 2
- Education: University of Gdańsk
- Occupation: Politician, business executive

Magdalena Małgorzata Kołodziejczak (Polish: [maɡ.daˈlɛ.na maw.ɡɔˈʐa.ta kɔ.wɔˈd͡ʑɛj.t͡ʂak]; née Szulc, Polish: [ˈʂult͡s]; born 19 June 1958) is a Polish politician. Since 2023, she is a member of the Sejm of Poland, representing the constituency no. 25, consisting of the eastern portion of the Pomeranian Voivodeship. From 2002 to 2023, she was the mayor of the Pruszcz Gdański Municipality in Gdańsk County, Pomeranian Voivodeship. Kołodziejczak is a member of the Civic Coalition party, as well as the Yes! For Poland political movement, and until 2025, she belonged to the Civic Platform.

== Biography ==
Magdalena Kołodziejczak (née Szulc) was born on 19 June 1958 in the village of Dąbrówka, located in Aleksandrów County within Kuyavian–Pomeranian Voivodeship, Poland. She is a daughter of Barbara and Bolesław Szulc. She grew up in the nearby town of Ciechocinek. Kołodziejczak moved to the city of Gdańsk at the age of 17, where she finished the Defenders of Hel 6th General Education Secondary School. In 1981, Kołodziejczak graduated from the University of Gdańsk, with a master's degree in law. Afterwards, she worked in a business sector. Kołodziejczak became a deputy chairperson of the Rotmanka Housing Cooperative for the Construction of Single-Family Houses (Polish: Spółdzielnia Mieszkaniowa Budowy Domów Jednorodzinnych „Rotmanka”), responsible for a suburb housing estate of single-family houses in the town of Pruszcz Gdański. She was its chairperson from 1993 to 2002.

In the 1998 election, Kołodziejczak was elected as member to the council of the Pruszcz Gdański Municipality, from the constituency no. 3, and receiving 422 votes (49.13%). She was a member of the council until 2002, and served as the chairperson of its audit committee. In the 2002 election, she was elected as the mayor of Pruszcz Gdański Municipality. Kołodziejczak received 2,453 votes (45.95%) in the first round, and 2,475 votes (51.17%) in the second round, defeating the incumbent, Daniel Matyja. She was reelected in 2006, 2010, 2014, 2018, each time winning in the first round. Kołodziejczak run as a candidate of local election committees, as a member of the Civic Platform party. She received 3,943 (67.1%), 4,108 (60.38%), 5,033 (68.77%), and 6,999 (59.27%) votes, respectively. (Note: Attributed to multiple references:)

In 2020, Kołodziejczak became a member of Yes! For Poland, an association and a cross-party political movement of local government politicians. She was also member of its political council. In the 2023 election, Kołodziejczak was elected to the Sejm of Poland, from the constituency no. 25, consisting of the eastern portion of the Pomeranian Voivodeship. She run on an electoral list of the Civic Coalition electoral alliance, and received 12,773 votes (2.07%). In the Sejm, Kołodziejczak joined the Liaison with Poles Abroad Committee, and the Infrastructure Committee. In October 2025, the Civic Platform merged with other parties, forming the Civic Coalition. In 2026, she became a member of the board of its Pomeranian Voivodeship division.

== Personal life ==
Kołodziejczak has a husband and two children. She resides in the village of Straszyn in Gdańsk County in Pomeranian Voivodeship, Poland.

== Orders and decorations ==
- Silver Cross of Merit (2010)

== Awards ==
- Best Public Space of Pomeranian Voivodeship (2020)
- Pearl of the Local Government by Dziennik Gazeta Prawna (2020)

== Electoral results ==
Year	Office		Party	Constituency	Primary			Secondary			Result	Ref.
Year	Office		Party	Constituency	Total	%	P.	Total	%	P.	Result	Ref.
1998	Pruszcz Gdański Municipal Council	1st	Local Government Electoral; Our Neighbourhood	No. 3	422	49.13	1st	—N/a			Won	
2002	Mayor of Pruszcz Gdański Municipality	2nd	Local Government Electoral; Common Municipality	—N/a	2,453	45.95	1st	2,475	51.17	1st	Won	
2006	Mayor of Pruszcz Gdański Municipality	3rd	Local Government Electoral; Common Municipality	—N/a	3,943	67.10	1st	—N/a			Won	
2010	Mayor of Pruszcz Gdański Municipality	3rd	Local Government Electoral; Common Municipality of Pruszcz Gdański	—N/a	4,108	60.38	1st	—N/a			Won	
2014	Mayor of Pruszcz Gdański Municipality	3rd	Local Government Electoral; Common Municipality of Pruszcz Gdański	—N/a	5,033	68.77	1st	—N/a			Won	
2018	Mayor of Pruszcz Gdański Municipality	3rd	Local Government Electoral; Common Municipality of Pruszcz Gdański	—N/a	6,999	59.27	1st	—N/a			Won	
2023	Sejm of Poland	10th	Civic Coalition	No. 25	12,773	2.07	11th	—N/a			Won	
