= Gmina Bądkowo =

Gmina Bądkowo Bądkowo Commune
- Gmina
- Flag Coat of arms
- Interactive map of Gmina Bądkowo
- Coordinates (Bądkowo): 52°43′N 18°46′E
- Country: Poland
- Voivodeship: Kuyavian-Pomeranian
- County: Aleksandrów
- Seat: Bądkowo

Area
  - Total: 79.7 km^{2} (30.8 sq mi)

Population (2006)
  - Total: 4,582
  - Density: 57.5/km^{2} (149/sq mi)
- Website: http://www.badkowo.gmina.pl

Gmina Bądkowo is a rural gmina (administrative district) in Aleksandrów County, Kuyavian-Pomeranian Voivodeship, in north-central Poland. Its seat is the village of Bądkowo, which lies approximately 18 kilometres (11 mi) south of Aleksandrów Kujawski and 37 km (23 mi) south of Toruń.

The gmina covers an area of 79.7 square kilometres (30.8 sq mi), and as of 2006 its total population is 4,582.

== Villages ==
Gmina Bądkowo contains the villages of Antoniewo, Bądkówek, Bądkowo, Biele, Jaranowo, Kalinowiec, Kolonia Łowiczek, Kryńsk, Kujawka, Kwiatkowo, Łowiczek, Łówkowice, Sinki, Słupy Duże, Słupy Małe, Tomaszewo, Toporzyszczewo, Wójtówka, Wysocin, Żabieniec and Zieleniec.

== Neighbouring gminas ==
Gmina Bądkowo is bordered by the gminas of Brześć Kujawski, Koneck, Lubanie, Osięciny, Waganiec and Zakrzewo.
