= Lepsze =

- Village
- Location within Poland
- Coordinates: 52°44′35″N 18°39′53″E
- Country: Poland
- Voivodeship: Kuyavian-Pomeranian
- County: Aleksandrów
- Gmina: Zakrzewo
- Population: 3,256

Lepsze [ˈlɛpʂɛ] is a village in the administrative district of Gmina Zakrzewo, within Aleksandrów County, Kuyavian-Pomeranian Voivodeship, in north-central Poland.
