= Zazdromin =

- Village
- Location within Poland
- Coordinates: 52°49′N 18°40′E
- Country: Poland
- Voivodeship: Kuyavian-Pomeranian
- County: Aleksandrów
- Gmina: Koneck

Zazdromin [zazˈdrɔmin] is a village in the administrative district of Gmina Koneck, within Aleksandrów County, Kuyavian-Pomeranian Voivodeship, in north-central Poland.
