= Kajetanowo =

Kajetanowo may refer to:

- Kajetanowo, Kuyavian-Pomeranian Voivodeship, Poland
- Kajetanowo, Podlaskie Voivodeship, Poland
