= Gmina Waganiec =

Gmina Waganiec Waganiec Commune
- Gmina
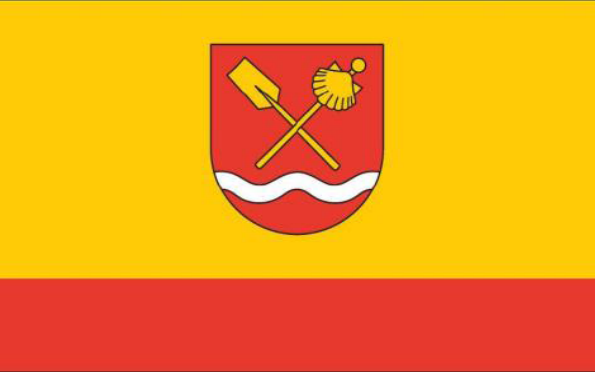
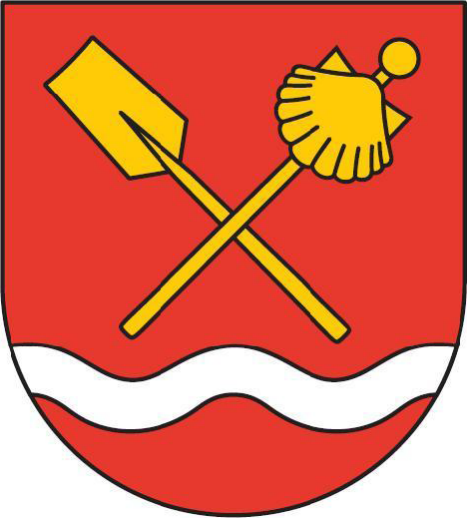
- Flag Coat of arms
- Interactive map of Gmina Waganiec
- Coordinates (Waganiec): 52°49′N 18°51′E
- Country: Poland
- Voivodeship: Kuyavian-Pomeranian
- County: Aleksandrów
- Seat: Waganiec

Area
  - Total: 54.56 km^{2} (21.07 sq mi)

Population (2006)
  - Total: 4,400
  - Density: 81/km^{2} (210/sq mi)
- Website: http://www.ugwaganiec.pl/

Gmina Waganiec is a rural gmina (administrative district) in Aleksandrów County, Kuyavian-Pomeranian Voivodeship, in north-central Poland. Its seat is the village of Waganiec, which lies approximately 12 kilometres (7 mi) south-east of Aleksandrów Kujawski and 29 km (18 mi) south-east of Toruń.

The gmina covers an area of 54.56 square kilometres (21.1 sq mi), and as of 2006 its total population is 4,400.

== Villages ==
Gmina Waganiec contains the villages and settlements of Ariany, Bertowo, Brudnowo, Byzie, Ciupkowo, Janowo, Józefowo, Kaźmierzyn, Kolonia Święte, Konstantynowo, Lewin, Michalin, Niszczewy, Nowy Zbrachlin, Plebanka, Przypust, Sierzchowo, Siutkowo, Śliwkowo, Stannowo, Stary Zbrachlin, Szpitalka, Waganiec, Wiktoryn, Włoszyca, Wójtówka, Wólne, Zakrzewo and Zbrachlin.

== Neighbouring gminas ==
Gmina Waganiec is bordered by the town of Nieszawa and by the gminas of Bądkowo, Bobrowniki, Koneck, Lubanie and Raciążek.
