= Antoniewo, Aleksandrów County =

Antoniewo
- Village
- Location within Poland
- Coordinates: 52°29′27″N 18°48′55″E
- Country: Poland
- Voivodeship: Kuyavian-Pomeranian
- County: Aleksandrów
- Gmina: Bądkowo

Antoniewo [antɔˈɲɛvɔ] is a village in the administrative district of Gmina Bądkowo, within Aleksandrów County, Kuyavian-Pomeranian Voivodeship, in north-central Poland.
