= Plebanka, Gmina Waganiec =

Plebanka
- Village
- Location within Poland
- Coordinates: 52°48′2″N 18°52′57″E
- Country: Poland
- Voivodeship: Kuyavian-Pomeranian
- County: Aleksandrów
- Gmina: Waganiec
- Population: 310

Plebanka [plɛˈbaŋka] is a village in the administrative district of Gmina Waganiec, within Aleksandrów County, Kuyavian-Pomeranian Voivodeship, in north-central Poland.
