= Gmina Raciążek =

Gmina Raciążek Raciążek Commune
- Gmina
- Coat of arms
- Interactive map of Gmina Raciążek
- Coordinates (Raciążek): 52°52′N 18°49′E
- Country: Poland
- Voivodeship: Kuyavian-Pomeranian
- County: Aleksandrów
- Seat: Raciążek

Area
  - Total: 32.89 km^{2} (12.70 sq mi)

Population (2006)
  - Total: 3,084
  - Density: 93.77/km^{2} (242.9/sq mi)
- Website: http://www.raciazek.lo.pl

Gmina Raciążek is a rural gmina (administrative district) in Aleksandrów County, Kuyavian-Pomeranian Voivodeship, in north-central Poland. Its seat is the village of Raciążek, which lies approximately 8 kilometres (5 mi) east of Aleksandrów Kujawski and 23 km (14 mi) south-east of Toruń.

The gmina covers an area of 32.89 square kilometres (12.7 sq mi), and as of 2006 its total population is 3,084.

== Villages ==
Gmina Raciążek contains the villages and settlements of Dąbrówka Duża, Niestuszewo, Podole, Podzamcze, Raciążek, Siarzewo, Turzno and Turzynek.

== Neighbouring gminas ==
Gmina Raciążek is bordered by the towns of Ciechocinek and Nieszawa, and by the gminas of Aleksandrów Kujawski, Czernikowo, Koneck and Waganiec.
