= Niestuszewo =

- Village
- Location within Poland
- Coordinates: 52°51′N 18°51′E
- Country: Poland
- Voivodeship: Kuyavian-Pomeranian
- County: Aleksandrów
- Gmina: Raciążek

Niestuszewo [ɲɛstuˈʂɛvɔ] is a village in the administrative district of Gmina Raciążek, within Aleksandrów County, Kuyavian-Pomeranian Voivodeship, in north-central Poland.
