= Bachorza, Kuyavian-Pomeranian Voivodeship =

Bachorza
- Village
- Location within Poland
- Coordinates: 52°44′N 18°38′E
- Country: Poland
- Voivodeship: Kuyavian-Pomeranian
- County: Aleksandrów
- Gmina: Zakrzewo
- Time zone: UTC+1 (CET)
  - Summer (DST): UTC+2 (CEST)
- Vehicle registration: CAL

Bachorza [baˈxɔʐa] is a village in the administrative district of Gmina Zakrzewo, within Aleksandrów County, Kuyavian-Pomeranian Voivodeship, in central Poland.

Eight Polish citizens were murdered by Nazi Germany in the village during World War II.
