= Zapustek =

- Village
- Location within Poland
- Coordinates: 52°46′46″N 18°40′49″E
- Country: Poland
- Voivodeship: Kuyavian-Pomeranian
- County: Aleksandrów
- Gmina: Koneck
- Population: 160

Zapustek [zaˈpustɛk] is a village in the administrative district of Gmina Koneck, within Aleksandrów County, Kuyavian-Pomeranian Voivodeship, in north-central Poland. It is within the Central European Time Zone (GMT+1)
