= Sędzin =

- Village
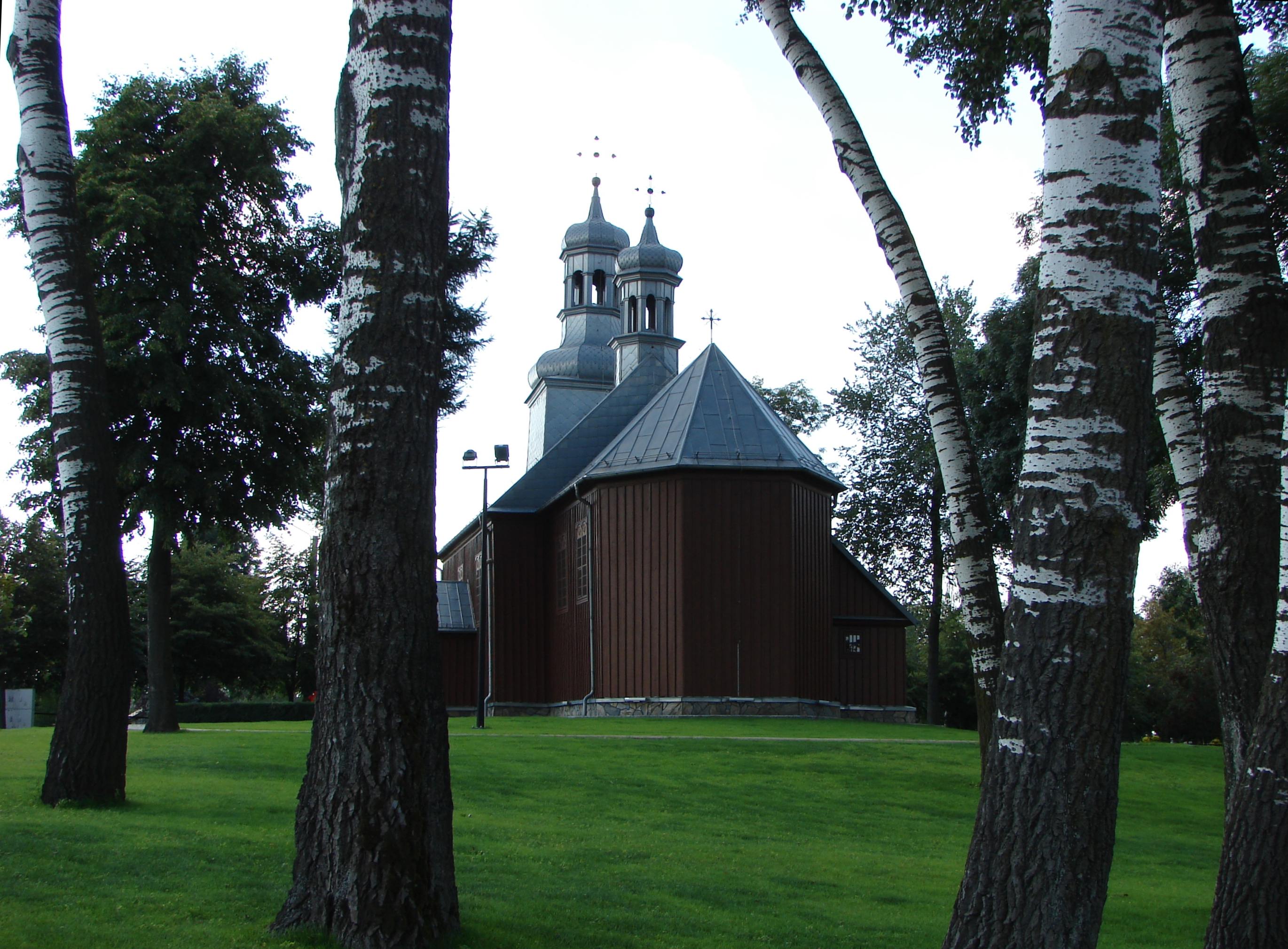
- Wooden church of St. Matthew

- Location within Poland
- Coordinates: 52°44′N 18°34′E
- Country: Poland
- Voivodeship: Kuyavian-Pomeranian
- County: Aleksandrów
- Gmina: Zakrzewo
- Population (approx.): 600
- Time zone: UTC+1 (CET)
  - Summer (DST): UTC+2 (CEST)
- Vehicle registration: CAL

Sędzin [ˈsɛnd͡ʑin] is a village in the administrative district of Gmina Zakrzewo, within Aleksandrów County, Kuyavian-Pomeranian Voivodeship, in north-central Poland. It is located in Kuyavia.

The village has an approximate population of 600.

== History ==
The area formed part of Poland since the establishment of the state in the 10th century. In 1252, Duke Casimir I of Kuyavia granted privileges to the village. In 1750, the chapter of the Diocese of Płock funded the construction of the wooded church of St. Matthew in the village.

During the German occupation of Poland (World War II), Sędzin was one of the sites of executions of Poles, carried out by the Germans in 1939 as part of the Intelligenzaktion. In 1940, the occupiers also carried out expulsions of Poles, whose houses were then handed over to German colonists as part of the Lebensraum policy. Expelled Poles were either deported to the General Government in the more eastern part of German-occupied Poland or enslaved as forced labour of new German colonists in the county. A local teacher was among Polish teachers murdered by the Germans in the Mauthausen concentration camp.
