= Turzynek =

- Village
- Location within Poland
- Coordinates: 52°49′21″N 18°47′01″E
- Country: Poland
- Voivodeship: Kuyavian-Pomeranian
- County: Aleksandrów
- Gmina: Raciążek

Turzynek [tuˈʐɨnɛk] is a village in the administrative district of Gmina Raciążek, within Aleksandrów County, Kuyavian-Pomeranian Voivodeship, in north-central Poland.
