= Brzeźno, Aleksandrów County =

Brzeźno
- Village
- Location within Poland
- Coordinates: 52°50′N 18°45′E
- Country: Poland
- Voivodeship: Kuyavian-Pomeranian
- County: Aleksandrów
- Gmina: Koneck
- Time zone: UTC+1 (CET)
  - Summer (DST): UTC+2 (CEST)
- Vehicle registration: CAL

Brzeźno [ˈbʐɛʑnɔ] is a village in the administrative district of Gmina Koneck, within Aleksandrów County, Kuyavian-Pomeranian Voivodeship, in north-central Poland. It is located in the historic region of Kuyavia.

== History ==
The village dates back to medieval Piast-ruled Poland. According to a document from 1250, the village was owned by the Bishops of Kuyavia. In the late 19th century it had a population of 201.

During the German occupation of Poland (World War II), in 1940, the occupiers carried out expulsions of Poles, whose farms were then handed over to German colonists as part of the Lebensraum policy.
