= Sierzchowo =

- Village
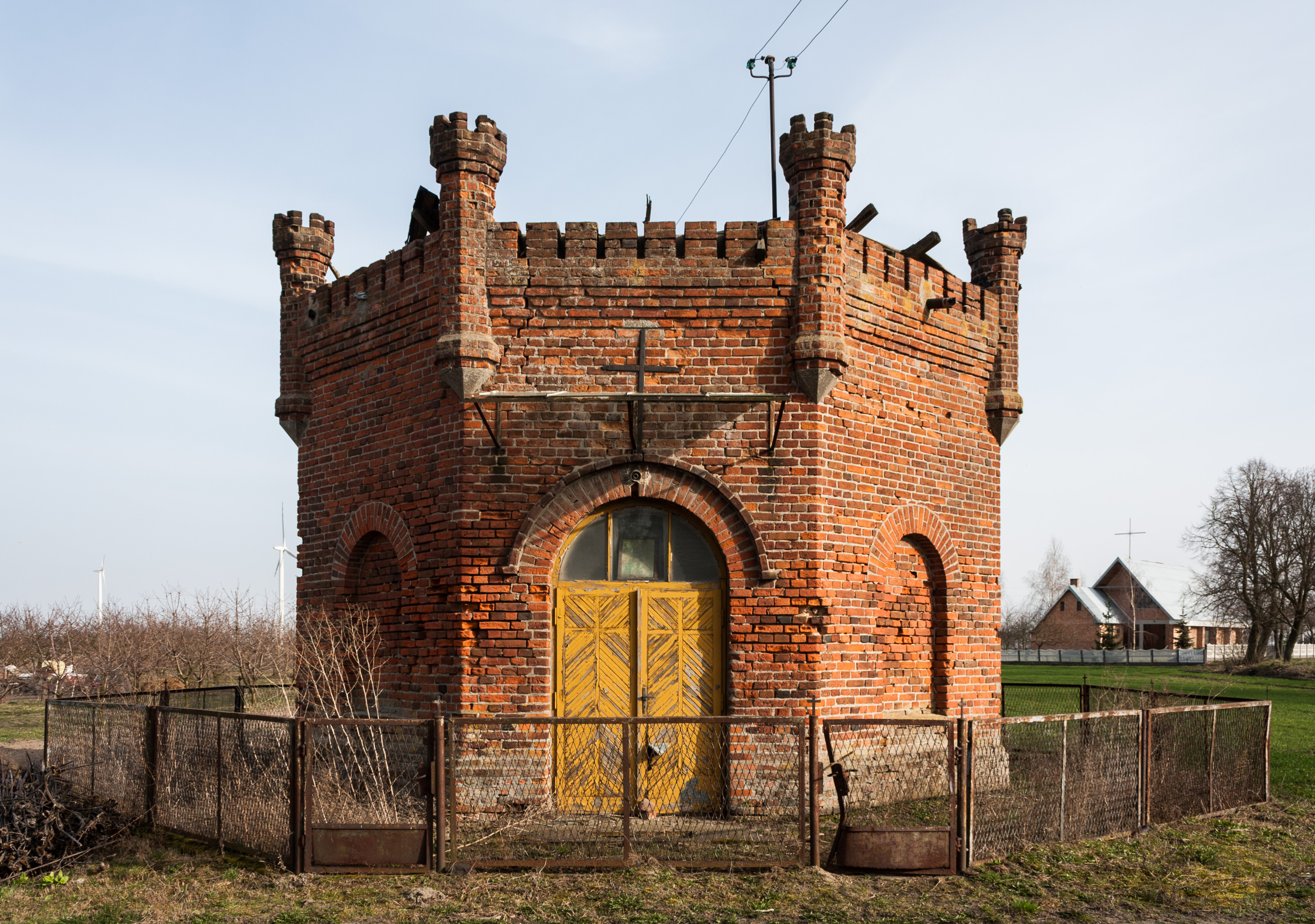
- Former forge from in Sierzchowo, Kuyavian-Pomeraniach Voivodeship, Poland

- Location within Poland
- Coordinates: 52°49′23″N 18°51′13″E
- Country: Poland
- Voivodeship: Kuyavian-Pomeranian
- County: Aleksandrów
- Gmina: Waganiec

Sierzchowo [ɕɛʂˈxɔvɔ] is a village in the administrative district of Gmina Waganiec, within Aleksandrów County, Kuyavian-Pomeranian Voivodeship, in north-central Poland.
