= Młynek, Kuyavian-Pomeranian Voivodeship =

Młynek
- Village
- Location within Poland
- Coordinates: 52°48′00″N 18°43′34″E
- Country: Poland
- Voivodeship: Kuyavian-Pomeranian
- County: Aleksandrów
- Gmina: Koneck

Młynek [ˈmwɨnɛk] is a village in the administrative district of Gmina Koneck, within Aleksandrów County, Kuyavian-Pomeranian Voivodeship, in north-central Poland.
