= Zbrachlin =

Zbrachlin is the name of two villages in the Kuyavian-Pomeranian Voivodeship of Poland:

- Zbrachlin, Aleksandrów County
- Zbrachlin, Świecie County
