= Gmina Zakrzewo =

Gmina Zakrzewo may refer to either of the following rural administrative districts in Poland:

- Gmina Zakrzewo, Kuyavian-Pomeranian Voivodeship
- Gmina Zakrzewo, Greater Poland Voivodeship
