= Ujma Duża =

- Village
- Location within Poland
- Coordinates: 52°43′N 18°43′E
- Country: Poland
- Voivodeship: Kuyavian-Pomeranian
- County: Aleksandrów
- Gmina: Zakrzewo
- Time zone: UTC+1 (CET)
  - Summer (DST): UTC+2 (CEST)
- Vehicle registration: CAL

Ujma Duża [ˈui̯ma ˈduʐa] is a village in the administrative district of Gmina Zakrzewo, within Aleksandrów County, Kuyavian-Pomeranian Voivodeship, in central Poland.

Eleven Polish citizens were murdered by Nazi Germany in the village during World War II.
