= Kaźmierzyn =

- Village
- Location within Poland
- Coordinates: 52°48′12″N 18°51′47″E
- Country: Poland
- Voivodeship: Kuyavian-Pomeranian
- County: Aleksandrów
- Gmina: Waganiec
- Population: 230

Kaźmierzyn [kaʑˈmjɛʐɨn] is a village in the administrative district of Gmina Waganiec, within Aleksandrów County, Kuyavian-Pomeranian Voivodeship, in north-central Poland.
