= Michalin, Aleksandrów County =

Michalin
- Village
- Location within Poland
- Coordinates: 52°48′N 18°50′E
- Country: Poland
- Voivodeship: Kuyavian-Pomeranian
- County: Aleksandrów
- Gmina: Waganiec
- Population (approx.): 80

Michalin [miˈxalin] is a village in the administrative district of Gmina Waganiec, within Aleksandrów County, Kuyavian-Pomeranian Voivodeship, in north-central Poland.

The village has an approximate population of 80.
