= Lowkowice =

Lowkowice may refer to the following places in Poland:

- Łowkowice, Kluczbork County, Opole Voivodeship (south-west Poland)
- Łowkowice, Krapkowice County, Opole Voivodeship (south-west Poland)
- Łówkowice, Kuyavian-Pomeranian Voivodeship (north-central Poland)
