= Jaranowo =

- Village
- Location within Poland
- Coordinates: 52°41′N 18°49′E
- Country: Poland
- Voivodeship: Kuyavian-Pomeranian
- County: Aleksandrów
- Gmina: Bądkowo

Jaranowo [jaraˈnɔvɔ] is a village in the administrative district of Gmina Bądkowo, within Aleksandrów County, Kuyavian-Pomeranian Voivodeship, in north-central Poland.
