= Niszczewy =

- Village
- Location within Poland
- Coordinates: 52°47′09″N 18°49′06″E
- Country: Poland
- Voivodeship: Kuyavian-Pomeranian
- County: Aleksandrów
- Gmina: Waganiec
- Population (approx.): 100
- Website: http://niszczewy.webpark.pl

Niszczewy [niʂˈt͡ʂɛvɨ] is a village in the administrative district of Gmina Waganiec, within Aleksandrów County, Kuyavian-Pomeranian Voivodeship, in north-central Poland.

The village has an approximate population of 100.
