= Starowola =

Starowola may refer to the following places:

- Starowola, Garwolin County in Masovian Voivodeship (east-central Poland)
- Starowola, Wołomin County in Masovian Voivodeship (east-central Poland)
- Starowola, Podlaskie Voivodeship (north-east Poland)
