= Konstantynowo, Kuyavian-Pomeranian Voivodeship =

Konstantynowo
- Village
- Location within Poland
- Coordinates: 52°49′N 18°49′E
- Country: Poland
- Voivodeship: Kuyavian-Pomeranian
- County: Aleksandrów
- Gmina: Waganiec

Konstantynowo [kɔnstantɨˈnɔvɔ] is a village in the administrative district of Gmina Waganiec, within Aleksandrów County, Kuyavian-Pomeranian Voivodeship, in north-central Poland.
