= Ariany =

Ariany may refer to:

- Ariany, Spain
- Ariany, Poland
