= Spoczynek, Kuyavian-Pomeranian Voivodeship =

Spoczynek
- Village
- Location within Poland
- Coordinates: 52°47′N 18°45′E
- Country: Poland
- Voivodeship: Kuyavian-Pomeranian
- County: Aleksandrów
- Gmina: Koneck

Spoczynek [spɔˈt͡ʂɨnɛk] is a village in the administrative district of Gmina Koneck, within Aleksandrów County, Kuyavian-Pomeranian Voivodeship, in north-central Poland.
