= Śliwkowo =

- Village
- Location within Poland
- Coordinates: 52°46′N 18°51′E
- Country: Poland
- Voivodeship: Kuyavian-Pomeranian
- County: Aleksandrów
- Gmina: Waganiec
- Population (approx.): 300

Śliwkowo [ɕlifˈkɔvɔ] is a village in the administrative district of Gmina Waganiec, within Aleksandrów County, Kuyavian-Pomeranian Voivodeship, in north-central Poland.

The village has an approximate population of 300.
