= Gmina Koneck =

Gmina Koneck Koneck Commune
- Gmina
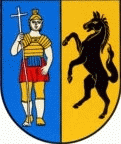
- Coat of arms
- Interactive map of Gmina Koneck
- Coordinates (Koneck): 52°47′N 18°43′E
- Country: Poland
- Voivodeship: Kuyavian-Pomeranian
- County: Aleksandrów
- Seat: Koneck

Area
  - Total: 68.13 km^{2} (26.31 sq mi)

Population (2006)
  - Total: 3,368
  - Density: 49.43/km^{2} (128.0/sq mi)

Gmina Koneck is a rural gmina (administrative district) in Aleksandrów County, Kuyavian-Pomeranian Voivodeship, in north-central Poland. Its seat is the village of Koneck, which lies approximately 10 kilometres (6 mi) south of Aleksandrów Kujawski and 29 km (18 mi) south of Toruń.

The gmina covers an area of 68.13 square kilometres (26.3 sq mi), and as of 2006 its total population is 3,368.

== Villages ==
Gmina Koneck contains the villages of Brzeźno, Chromowola, Jeziorno, Kajetanowo, Kamieniec, Koneck, Kruszynek, Kruszynek-Kolonia, Młynek, Opalanka, Ossówka, Pomiany, Romanowo, Spoczynek, Straszewo, Święte, Zapustek, Zazdromin and Żołnowo.

== Neighbouring gminas ==
Gmina Koneck is bordered by the gminas of Aleksandrów Kujawski, Bądkowo, Dąbrowa Biskupia, Raciążek, Waganiec and Zakrzewo.
