= Zieleniec, Kuyavian-Pomeranian Voivodeship =

Zieleniec
- Village
- Location within Poland
- Coordinates: 52°41′20″N 18°51′02″E
- Country: Poland
- Voivodeship: Kuyavian-Pomeranian
- County: Aleksandrów
- Gmina: Bądkowo

Zieleniec [ʑɛˈlɛɲɛt͡s] is a village in the administrative district of Gmina Bądkowo, within Aleksandrów County, Kuyavian-Pomeranian Voivodeship, in north-central Poland.
