= Sędzin-Kolonia =

- Village
- Location within Poland
- Coordinates: 52°43′28″N 18°33′03″E
- Country: Poland
- Voivodeship: Kuyavian-Pomeranian
- County: Aleksandrów
- Gmina: Zakrzewo

Sędzin-Kolonia [ˈsɛnd͡ʑin kɔˈlɔɲa] is a village in the administrative district of Gmina Zakrzewo, within Aleksandrów County, Kuyavian-Pomeranian Voivodeship, in north-central Poland.
