= Pomiany =

Pomiany may refer to the following places:

- Pomiany, Aleksandrów County in Kuyavian-Pomeranian Voivodeship (north-central Poland)
- Pomiany, Mogilno County in Kuyavian-Pomeranian Voivodeship (north-central Poland)
- Pomiany, Podlaskie Voivodeship (north-east Poland)
- Pomiany, Greater Poland Voivodeship (west-central Poland)
