= Zarębowo =

- Village
- Location within Poland
- Coordinates: 52°45′N 18°36′E
- Country: Poland
- Voivodeship: Kuyavian-Pomeranian
- County: Aleksandrów
- Gmina: Zakrzewo

Zarębowo [zarɛmˈbɔvɔ] is a village in the administrative district of Gmina Zakrzewo, within Aleksandrów County, Kuyavian-Pomeranian Voivodeship, in north-central Poland.
