= Kruszynek-Kolonia =

- Village
- Location within Poland
- Coordinates: 52°48′18″N 18°47′18″E
- Country: Poland
- Voivodeship: Kuyavian-Pomeranian
- County: Aleksandrów
- Gmina: Koneck
- Population: 110

Kruszynek-Kolonia [kruˈʂɨnɛk kɔˈlɔɲa] is a village in the administrative district of Gmina Koneck, within Aleksandrów County, Kuyavian-Pomeranian Voivodeship, in north-central Poland.
