= Bądkówek =

- Village
- Location within Poland
- Coordinates: 52°42′11″N 18°46′19″E
- Country: Poland
- Voivodeship: Kuyavian-Pomeranian
- County: Aleksandrów
- Gmina: Bądkowo

Bądkówek [bɔntˈkuvɛk] is a village in the administrative district of Gmina Bądkowo, within Aleksandrów County, Kuyavian-Pomeranian Voivodeship, in North-Central Poland.
