= Turzno, Aleksandrów County =

Turzno
- Village
- Location within Poland
- Coordinates: 52°50′N 18°47′E
- Country: Poland
- Voivodeship: Kuyavian-Pomeranian
- County: Aleksandrów
- Gmina: Raciążek

Turzno [ˈtuʐnɔ] is a village in the administrative district of Gmina Raciążek, within Aleksandrów County, Kuyavian-Pomeranian Voivodeship, in north-central Poland.
