= Ciupkowo =

- Village
- Location within Poland
- Coordinates: 52°46′29″N 18°50′9″E
- Country: Poland
- Voivodeship: Kuyavian-Pomeranian
- County: Aleksandrów
- Gmina: Waganiec

Ciupkowo [t͡ɕupˈkɔvɔ] is a village in the administrative district of Gmina Waganiec, within Aleksandrów County, Kuyavian-Pomeranian Voivodeship, in north-central Poland.
