= Kalinowiec, Kuyavian-Pomeranian Voivodeship =

Kalinowiec
- Village
- Location within Poland
- Coordinates: 52°44′18″N 18°49′44″E
- Country: Poland
- Voivodeship: Kuyavian-Pomeranian
- County: Aleksandrów
- Gmina: Bądkowo

Kalinowiec [kaliˈnɔvjɛt͡s] is a village in the administrative district of Gmina Bądkowo, within Aleksandrów County, Kuyavian-Pomeranian Voivodeship, in north-central Poland.
