= Kolonia Święte =

- Village
- Location within Poland
- Coordinates: 53°27′56″N 18°35′20″E
- Country: Poland
- Voivodeship: Kuyavian-Pomeranian
- County: Aleksandrów
- Gmina: Waganiec

Kolonia Święte (Polish pronunciation: [kɔˈlɔɲa ˈɕfjɛntɛ]) is a village in the administrative district of Gmina Waganiec, within Aleksandrów County, Kuyavian-Pomeranian Voivodeship, in north-central Poland.
