= Wysocin, Kuyavian-Pomeranian Voivodeship =

Wysocin
- Village
- Location within Poland
- Coordinates: 52°40′19″N 18°49′31″E
- Country: Poland
- Voivodeship: Kuyavian-Pomeranian
- County: Aleksandrów
- Gmina: Bądkowo

Wysocin [vɨˈsɔt͡ɕin] is a village in the administrative district of Gmina Bądkowo, within Aleksandrów County, Kuyavian-Pomeranian Voivodeship, in north-central Poland.
