= Podzamcze, Kuyavian-Pomeranian Voivodeship =

Podzamcze
- Village
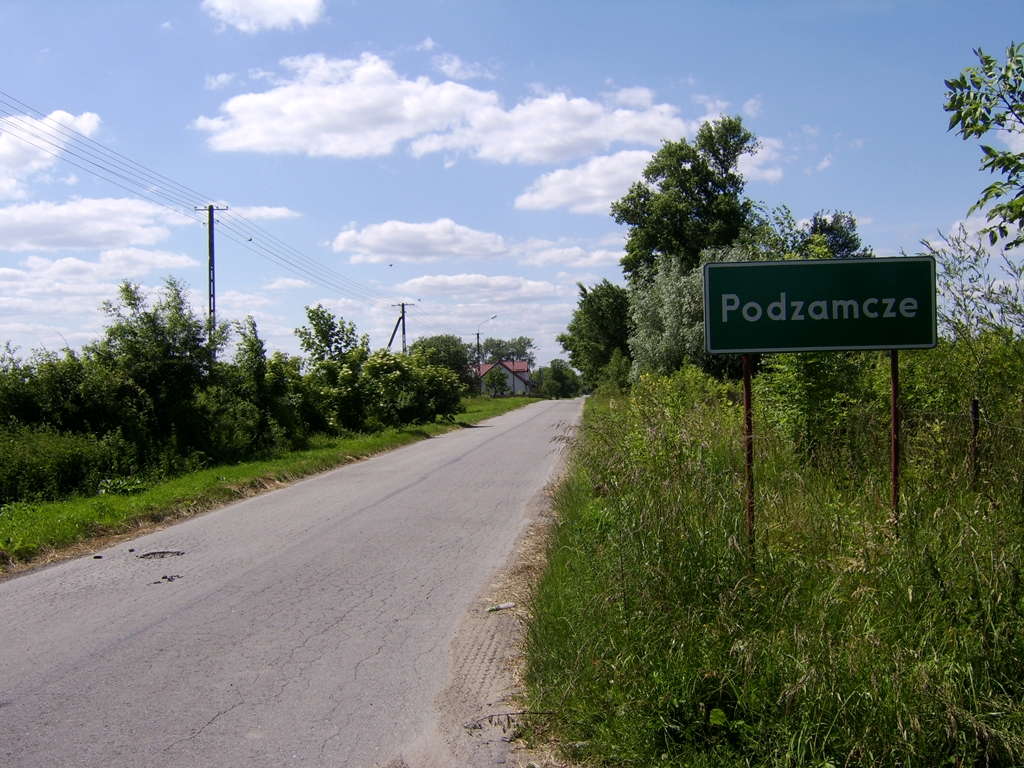
- Street of Podzamcze, Kuyavian-Pomeranian Voivodeship

- Location within Poland
- Coordinates: 52°50′57″N 18°50′08″E
- Country: Poland
- Voivodeship: Kuyavian-Pomeranian
- County: Aleksandrów
- Gmina: Raciążek

Podzamcze [pɔˈd͡zamt͡ʂɛ] is a village in the administrative district of Gmina Raciążek, within Aleksandrów County, Kuyavian-Pomeranian Voivodeship, in north-central Poland.
