= Koneck =

- Village
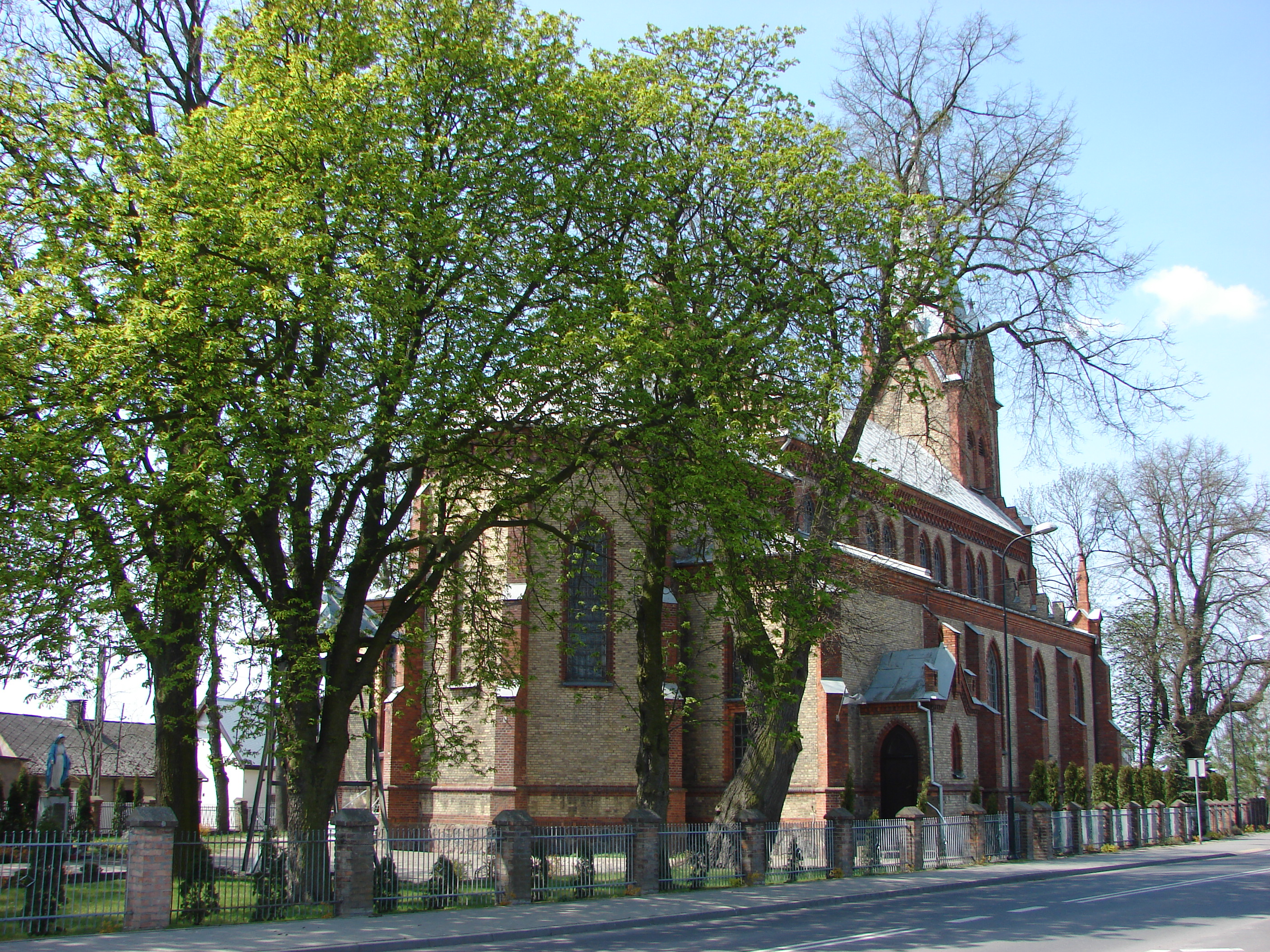
- Parish church of Saint Procopius, built 1902.

- Location within Poland
- Coordinates: 52°47′N 18°43′E
- Country: Poland
- Voivodeship: Kuyavian-Pomeranian
- County: Aleksandrów
- Gmina: Koneck
- Time zone: UTC+1 (CET)
  - Summer (DST): UTC+2 (CEST)
- Vehicle registration: CAL

Koneck [ˈkɔnɛt͡sk] is a village in Aleksandrów County, Kuyavian-Pomeranian Voivodeship, in north-central Poland. It is the seat of the gmina (administrative district) called Gmina Koneck. It is located in the historic region of Kuyavia.

== Massacre during Second World War ==
During the German Invasion of Poland, which started World War II in 1939, German minority members in Poland on 10 September with help of the German army murdered 17 Poles and Jews (see also Nazi crimes against the Polish nation). The victims were buried in mass graves. The village was under German occupation from 1939 to 1945. In 1940, the occupiers carried out expulsions of Poles, whose farms were then handed over to German colonists as part of the Lebensraum policy.
