= Wójtówka, Gmina Bądkowo =

Wójtówka
- Village
- Location within Poland
- Coordinates: 52°45′51″N 18°47′29″E
- Country: Poland
- Voivodeship: Kuyavian-Pomeranian
- County: Aleksandrów
- Gmina: Bądkowo

Wójtówka [vui̯ˈtufka] is a village in the administrative district of Gmina Bądkowo, within Aleksandrów County, Kuyavian-Pomeranian Voivodeship, in north-central Poland.
