= Wójtówka, Gmina Waganiec =

Wójtówka
- Village
- Location within Poland
- Coordinates: 52°48′13″N 18°54′31″E
- Country: Poland
- Voivodeship: Kuyavian-Pomeranian
- County: Aleksandrów
- Gmina: Waganiec

Wójtówka [vui̯ˈtufka] is a village in the administrative district of Gmina Waganiec, within Aleksandrów County, Kuyavian-Pomeranian Voivodeship, in north-central Poland.
