= Parysów =

- Village
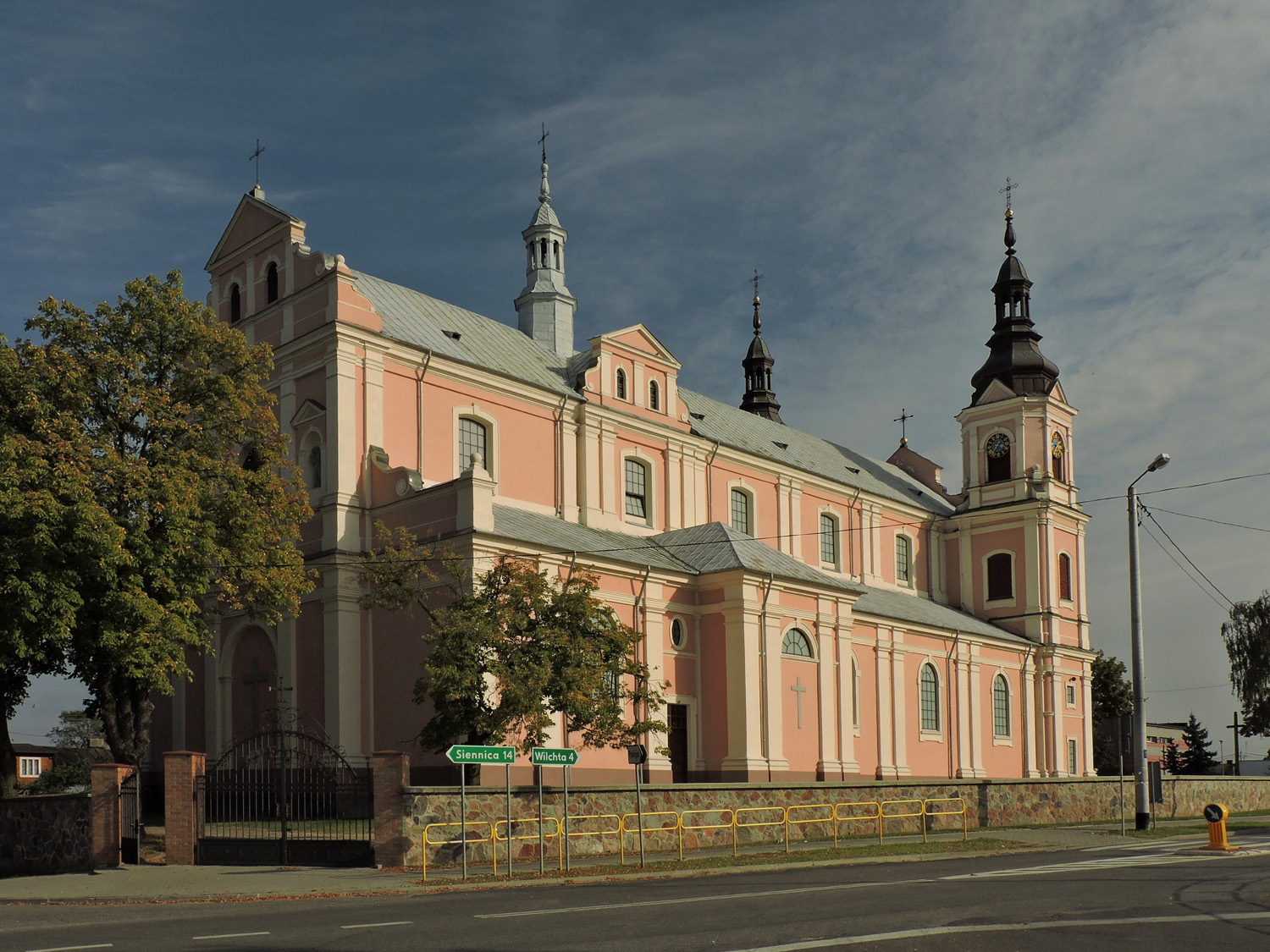
- Church of the Assumption in Parysów

- Coat of arms

- Location within Poland
- Coordinates: 51°58′N 21°41′E
- Country: Poland
- Voivodeship: Masovian
- County: Garwolin
- Gmina: Parysów

Population
  - Total: 1,100
- Website: http://www.parysow.asi.pl

Parysów [paˈrɨsuf] is a village in Garwolin County, Masovian Voivodeship, in east-central Poland. It is the seat of the gmina (administrative district) called Gmina Parysów.

In November 1940, the Jews of the village were forced into a ghetto, and the Jews of nearby villages were later concentrated there. On September 27, 1942, the SS raided the ghetto, and on October 2, they sent the 3,440 Jews who remained in it to the Treblinka extermination camp. During the action, 39 of the ghetto residents were murdered on the spot.
