= Bądkowo, Kuyavian-Pomeranian Voivodeship =

Bądkowo
- Village
- Parish church of Saint Matthew, built about 1312.

- Location within Poland
- Coordinates: 52°43′N 18°46′E
- Country: Poland
- Voivodeship: Kuyavian-Pomeranian
- County: Aleksandrów
- Gmina: Bądkowo
- Time zone: UTC+1 (CET)
  - Summer (DST): UTC+2 (CEST)
- Vehicle registration: CAL

Bądkowo [bɔntˈkɔvɔ] is a village in Aleksandrów County, Kuyavian-Pomeranian Voivodeship, in central Poland. It is the seat of the gmina (administrative district) called Gmina Bądkowo.

Seven Polish citizens were murdered by Nazi Germany in the village during World War II.
