= Dąbrówka, Aleksandrów County =

Dąbrówka
- Village
- Location within Poland
- Coordinates: 52°50′N 18°49′E
- Country: Poland
- Voivodeship: Kuyavian-Pomeranian
- County: Aleksandrów
- Gmina: Raciążek

Dąbrówka (Polish: [dɔmˈbrufka]; until 2012: Dąbrówka Duża, Polish pronunciation: [Dąbrówka Duża]) is a village in the administrative district of Gmina Raciążek, within Aleksandrów County, Kuyavian-Pomeranian Voivodeship, in north-central Poland.
