= Gmina Zakrzewo, Kuyavian-Pomeranian Voivodeship =

Gmina Zakrzewo Zakrzewo Commune
- Gmina
- Coat of arms
- Interactive map of Gmina Zakrzewo
- Coordinates (Zakrzewo): 52°46′N 18°37′E
- Country: Poland
- Voivodeship: Kuyavian-Pomeranian
- County: Aleksandrów
- Seat: Zakrzewo

Area
  - Total: 76.08 km^{2} (29.37 sq mi)

Population (2006)
  - Total: 3,661
  - Density: 48.12/km^{2} (124.6/sq mi)

Gmina Zakrzewo is a rural gmina (administrative district) in Aleksandrów County, Kuyavian-Pomeranian Voivodeship, in north-central Poland. Its seat is the village of Zakrzewo, which lies approximately 13 kilometres (8 mi) south-west of Aleksandrów Kujawski and 30 km (19 mi) south of Toruń.

The gmina covers an area of 76.08 square kilometres (29.4 sq mi), and as of 2006 its total population is 3,661.

== Villages ==
Gmina Zakrzewo contains the villages and settlements of Bachorza, Gęsin, Gosławice, Kobielice, Kolonia Bodzanowska, Kuczkowo, Lepsze, Michałowo, Sędzin, Sędzin-Kolonia, Seroczki, Siniarzewo, Sinki, Ujma Duża, Wola Bachorna, Zakrzewo and Zarębowo.

== Neighbouring gminas ==
Gmina Zakrzewo is bordered by the gminas of Bądkowo, Dąbrowa Biskupia, Dobre, Koneck and Osięciny.
