= Choiny, Garwolin County =

Choiny
- Village
- Location within Poland
- Coordinates: 51°58′N 21°40′E
- Country: Poland
- Voivodeship: Masovian
- County: Garwolin
- Gmina: Parysów

Choiny [ˈxɔi̯nɨ]] is a village in the administrative district of Gmina Parysów, within Garwolin County, Masovian Voivodeship, in east-central Poland.
