= Górki-Kolonia, Masovian Voivodeship =

Górki-Kolonia
- Village
- Location within Poland
- Coordinates: 52°00′02″N 21°41′23″E
- Country: Poland
- Voivodeship: Masovian
- County: Garwolin
- Gmina: Parysów

Górki-Kolonia [ˈɡurki kɔˈlɔɲa] is a village in the administrative district of Gmina Parysów, within Garwolin County, Masovian Voivodeship, in east-central Poland.
