= Słup, Garwolin County =

Słup
- Village
- Location within Poland
- Coordinates: 51°58′N 21°43′E
- Country: Poland
- Voivodeship: Masovian
- County: Garwolin
- Gmina: Parysów

Słup [swup] is a village in the administrative district of Gmina Parysów, within Garwolin County, Masovian Voivodeship, in east-central Poland.
