= Stadion Miejski (Aleksandrów Kujawski) =

Sports arena in Aleksandrów Kujawski, Poland

Stadion miejski w Aleksandrowie Kujawskim
- Interactive map of Stadion miejski w Aleksandrowie Kujawskim
- Location: Aleksandrów Kujawski, Poland
- Coordinates: 52°52′21″N 18°40′58″E
- Operator: Orlęta Aleksandrów Kujawski
- Capacity: 5,000

Tenants
- Liga Okręgowa, Orlęta Aleksandrów Kujawski

Stadion Miejski w Aleksandrowie Kujawskim, also known as Stadium in Aleksandrów Kujawski, is a municipal sports arena in the town of Aleksandrów Kujawski in Poland. It was built in 1934 and was substantially renovated and expanded in 1980.
