= Włocławek Voivodeship =

Abolished voivodeship of Poland

Coordinates: 52°39′17″N 19°04′01″E

- 1975–1999
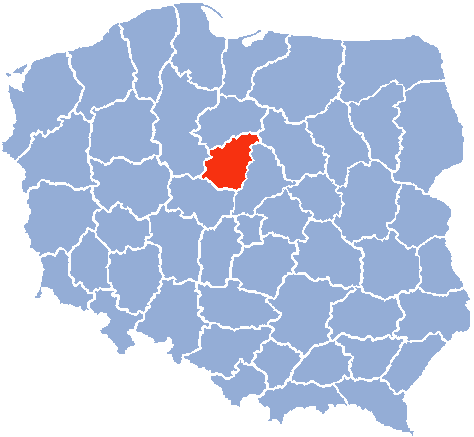
- Capital: Włocławek
- Population
  - 1975: 403,200
  - 1980: 413,400
  - 1985: 425,900
  - 1990: 429,400
  - 1995: 435,000
- History
  - Established: 1975
  - Disestablished: 1999
- Today part of: Kuyavian-Pomeranian Voivodeship

Włocławek Voivodeship (Polish: województwo włocławskie) was a unit of administrative division and local government in Poland in the years 1975–1998. It, along with the Bydgoszcz and Toruń Voivodeships, was superseded by the Kuyavian-Pomeranian Voivodeship following the 1999 Polish local government reforms. At the time of its disestablishment in 1998, its population was 434,700.

Major cities and towns (population in 1998): Włocławek (123,373), Rypin (16,971), Lipno (15,608), Aleksandrów Kujawski (13,031), Ciechocinek (11,312).

Capital city: Włocławek

Car plates: WE, WK, WL.

== See also ==
- Voivodeships of Poland
