= Gmina Parysów =

Gmina Parysów Parysów Commune
- Gmina
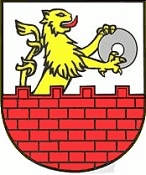
- Coat of arms
- Interactive map of Gmina Parysów
- Coordinates (Parysów): 51°58′N 21°41′E
- Country: Poland
- Voivodeship: Masovian
- County: Garwolin
- Seat: Parysów

Area
  - Total: 64.31 km^{2} (24.83 sq mi)

Population (2006)
  - Total: 4,082
  - Density: 63.47/km^{2} (164.4/sq mi)

Gmina Parysów is a rural gmina (administrative district) in Garwolin County, Masovian Voivodeship, in east-central Poland. Its seat is the village of Parysów, which lies approximately 9 kilometres (6 mi) north-east of Garwolin and 55 km (34 mi) south-east of Warsaw.

The gmina covers an area of 64.31 square kilometres (24.8 sq mi), and, as of 2006, its total population is 4,082.

== Villages ==
Gmina Parysów contains the villages and settlements of Choiny, Górki-Kolonia, Kozłów, Łukowiec, Parysów, Poschła, Słup, Starowola, Stodzew, Wola Starogrodzka, and Żabieniec.

== Neighbouring gminas ==
Gmina Parysów is bordered by the gminas of Borowie, Garwolin, Latowicz, Pilawa, and Siennica.
