= Łukowiec, Masovian Voivodeship =

Łukowiec
- Village
- Location within Poland
- Coordinates: 51°59′N 21°40′E
- Country: Poland
- Voivodeship: Masovian
- County: Garwolin
- Gmina: Parysów

Łukowiec [wuˈkɔvjɛt͡s] is a village in the administrative district of Gmina Parysów, within Garwolin County, Masovian Voivodeship, in east-central Poland.
