= Straszewo, Kuyavian-Pomeranian Voivodeship =

Straszewo
- Village
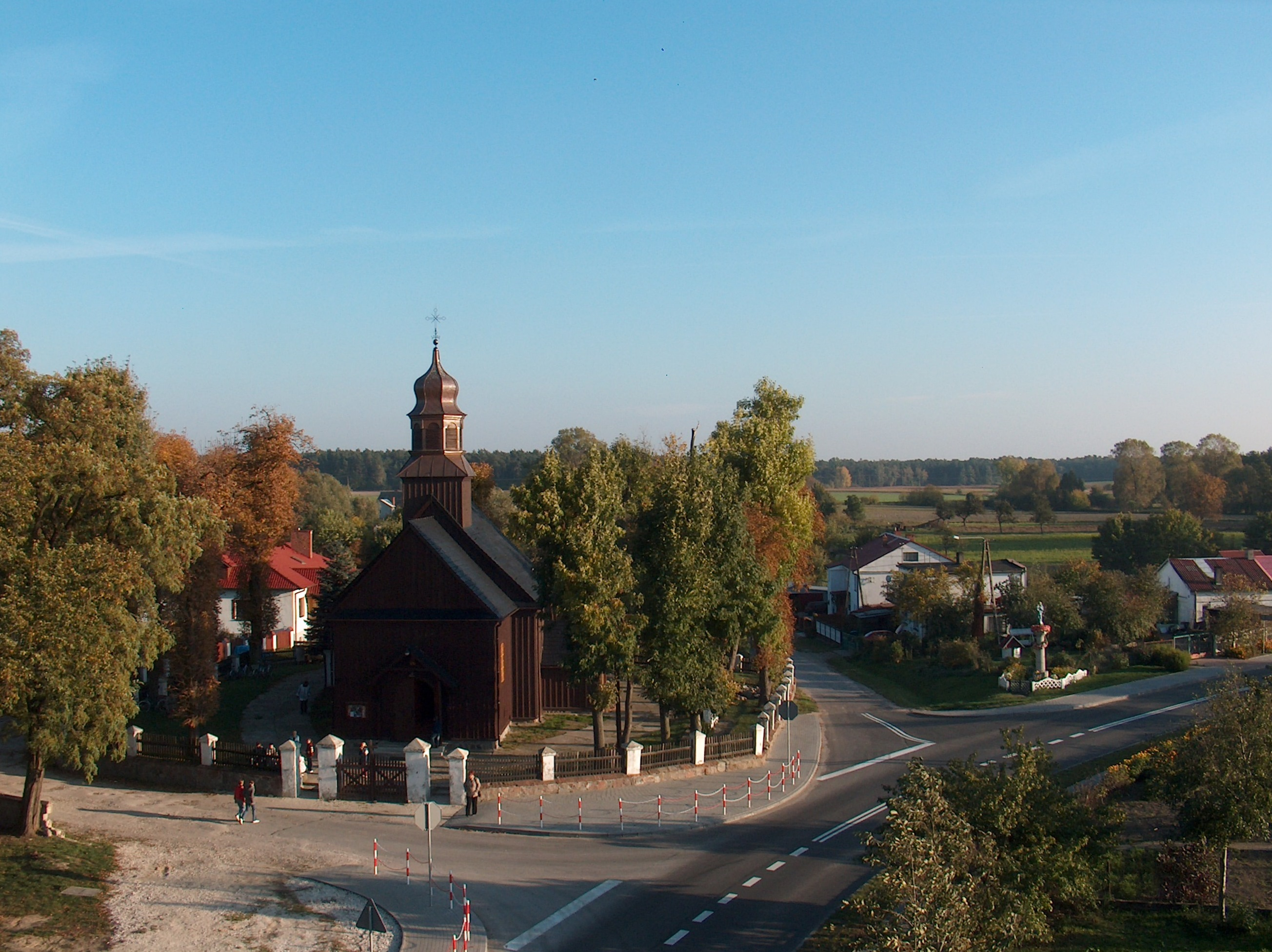
- View of Straszewo with the old Saint Martin church

- Location within Poland
- Coordinates: 52°47′N 18°39′E
- Country: Poland
- Voivodeship: Kuyavian-Pomeranian
- County: Aleksandrów
- Gmina: Koneck
- First mentioned: 1250
- Population: 430
- Time zone: UTC+1 (CET)
  - Summer (DST): UTC+2 (CEST)
- Vehicle registration: CAL

Straszewo [straˈʂɛvɔ] is a village in the administrative district of Gmina Koneck, in Aleksandrów County, Kuyavian-Pomeranian Voivodeship, in north-central Poland. It is located in the historic region of Kuyavia.

== History ==
During the German occupation of Poland (World War II), in 1940, the occupiers carried out expulsions of Poles, whose farms were then handed over to German colonists as part of the Lebensraum policy.

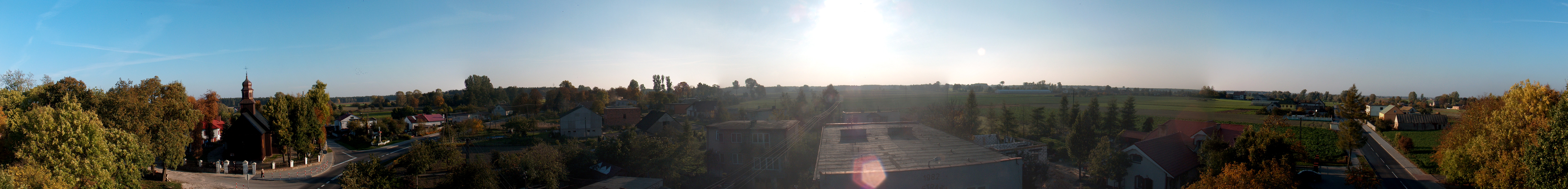
Straszewo Panorama

== See also ==
- Gmina Koneck
