= Wola Starogrodzka =

- Village
- Location within Poland
- Coordinates: 52°0′17″N 21°36′40″E
- Country: Poland
- Voivodeship: Masovian
- County: Garwolin
- Gmina: Parysów
- Population: 632

Wola Starogrodzka [ˈvɔla starɔˈɡrɔt͡ska] is a village in the administrative district of Gmina Parysów, within Garwolin County, Masovian Voivodeship, in east-central Poland.

The royal village was located in the second half of the 16th century in the Garwolin County, Czersk Land, Masovian Voivodeship. From 1954 to 1961, the village was part of and served as the administrative seat of the Wola Starogrodzka gromada (commune), and after its dissolution, it became part of the Parysów gromada. From 1975 to 1998, the village was administratively part of the Siedlce Voivodeship.
