= Kozłów, Garwolin County =

Kozłów
- Village
- Location within Poland
- Coordinates: 51°59′36″N 21°41′14″E
- Country: Poland
- Voivodeship: Masovian
- County: Garwolin
- Gmina: Parysów
- Population: 310

Kozłów [ˈkɔzwuf] is a village in the administrative district of Gmina Parysów, within Garwolin County, Masovian Voivodeship, in east-central Poland.
