= Stodzew =

- Village
- Location within Poland
- Coordinates: 52°1′N 21°39′E
- Country: Poland
- Voivodeship: Masovian
- County: Garwolin
- Gmina: Parysów

Stodzew [ˈstɔd͡zɛf] is a village in the administrative district of Gmina Parysów, within Garwolin County, Masovian Voivodeship, in east-central Poland.
