= Aliaksei Karpiuk =

Soviet-Belarusian writer, partisan leader, and human rights activist

- Аляксей Карпюк
- Born: 14 April 1920; Straszewo, a village close to Gródek, Białystok County, Poland
- Died: 14 July 1992 (aged 72); Grodno, Belarus
- Occupation: Writer

Aliaksei Karpiuk (Belarusian: Аляксей Карпюк, Russian: Алексей Карпюк; 14 April 1920 in Straszewo, a village close to Gródek, Białystok County, Poland – 14 July 1992 in Grodno, Belarus) was a Belarusian writer and public figure. Between 1960 until 1990 he was a leader of the intelligentsia in Grodno and supported dissident writers in the USSR.

== Biography ==
Aliaksei Karpiuk was born into a family of farmers, his father was a supporter of the Communist Party of Western Belarus. He graduated from a Seven-Years-School in 1934 and studied at the Polish lyceum at Wilna from 1938 to 1939. After the lyceum was forcefully closed during the Soviet occupation of Eastern Poland on 17 September 1939, he studied at the pedagogic college of higher education in Navahrudak.

After the German attack on the Soviet Union, he joined a subversive group. He was imprisoned in 1942 during an act of sabotage against railroad tracks, first sent to a prison in Białystok, and later to the German concentration camp Stutthof, which later played an important role in his biography. In autumn 1943 he managed to escape. From this moment on he actively participated in partisan campaigns. In 1944, he became leader of the Kalinovski partisan unit near Grodno. From 1944 to 1945 Karpiuk served in the Red Army and participated in battles on Polish and German territory (Berlin, April 1945). He was wounded twice and remained a disabled ex-service man.

In 1947, he joined the Communist Party of Belarus. In 1949, he graduated from the Pedagogical High School of Grodno in the subject of English Language. From 1949 to 1951 he worked in the Office for People's Education in Sapockino and was a director of the Biskup-Seven-Year-School in Vaŭkavysk district.

In 1953, he published his first work "At an Institute". Since 1953, he was a member of the Association of Writers of the USSR. In 1953–1955, he worked in Grodno at the Pedagogical High School, 1955–1957 at the regional newspaper "Hrodnenskaya Prawda" and as correspondent of the newspaper "Literature and Art". In 1961, he attended advanced training courses for literature in Moscow and became director of the Inturist agency in Grodno.

1965 he became secretary of the Grodno branch of the Writers Association of the USSR, 1977-1971 he was director of the "Republican Museum for Atheism and History" in Grodno (one of the most national conscious museums of Belarus during soviet times). In 1978, he was elected again as secretary of the Grodno branch of the Writers Association of the USSR. In the second half of the eighties he was actively engaged in the public and social life in Grodno. He was a supporter of the Belarusian Popular Front (BNF), one of the founders of the Society of Belarusians of the World "Backaushchyna" and maintained contacts to the club "Pahodnja".

Aliaksei Karpiuk is known for his works about the life in the Western part of Belarus in the first half of the twentieth century – this topic allowed for a depiction of national history under the conditions of Soviet censorship (short story "Danuta", novel "Verschalainski Paradise" and others) In the Grodno of 1960–1970 a free thinking intelligentsia gathered around Aliaksei Karpiuk. Some of its members where (at various times) Vasil Bykau, Danuta Bichel-Zagnetava, Volga Ipatava, Branislau Rsheuski. Aliaksei Karpiuk himself actively distributed forbidden literature in the USSR, and had correspondence with Aleksandr Solzhenitsyn (to whom he sent his works "Candle in the Wind", "Right Hand", "What a pity" for printing). Karpiuk had contacts to the family Genijush. Karpiuk's telephone conversations were wiretapped, his flat was secretly searched. Once he was warned on time and managed to destroy incriminating material – letters by Solzhenitsyn, Samizdat literature. As his wife recalled, "illegal literature was assembled at night time and drowned in water ... but some materials survived."

== Honors ==
Karpiuk was awarded the Order of the Red Flag, the Order of the Patriotic War (first and second class), various medals, the Golden Cross of the Polish order Wojenny Virtuti Militari and the Order of Cultural Merit of the Byelorussian Soviet Socialist Republic (BSSR) and in 1986 received the Literature-Ivan-Melesh award of the BSSR

== Bibliography ==
- Two Pines (orig.: Дзве сасны/Dzve sasny) (1958)
- Danuta (orig.: Данута) (1960)
- My Hrodna county (orig.: Мая Гродзеншчына/Maja Hrodzenščyna) (1960)
- Forest odyssey (orig.: Пушчанская адысея/Puščanskaja adyseja) (1964)
- What we are worth (Library of the journal "Voice of the homeland", 1970)
- Traces on Earth: Treasures and conquests of my Hrodna county (orig.: След на зямлі: Скарбы і здабыткі маёй Гродзеншчыны/Sled na zjamli: Skarby i zdabytki maëj Hrodzenščyny) (1972)
- Verschalainski Paradise (orig.: Вершалінскі рай/Veršalinski raj) (1974)
- Olga Korbut (orig.: Ольга Корбут/Ol'ha Korbut) (1977)
- Fresh fish (orig.: Свежая рыба/Svežaja ryba) (1978)
- Portrait (orig.: Партрэт/Partrėt) (1983)
- Contemporary conflict (orig.: Сучасны канфлікт/Sučasny kanflikt) (1985)
- Two sisters (orig.: Дзве сястры/Dzve sjastry) (Fairy tales, 1986)

Novels:

- Roots (orig.: Карані/Karani) (1988)
- White lady (orig.: Белая дама/Belaja dama)
- Requiem

Selected works were published in two volumes 1980 and 1990–1991. Selected works were also published in the "Belarusian Book Review" (Беларускі кнігазбор/"Belaruski knigazbor") in 2007.

== Documents ==
- ANH. F-3 (Aliaksei Karpiuk/Аляксей Карпюк)
- Center for the Safe-Keeping of Modern Documentation (Центр Хранения Современной Документации; Фонд 5, опись 61, ед. хранения 8182; ролик No. 009867)
- Decree of the regional committee of the KGB in Grodno "On the appeals and letters of war and labour veterans to the regional committee of the KGB regarding the publications of A.H.Karpiuk in the newspaper "Grodnyenskaya Pravda" (Постановление Бюро Гродненского обкома КПБ "Об обращении и письмах ветеранов войны и труда в обком КПБ на публикации А.Н.Карпюка в газете "Гродненская гравда") // Published in "Grodnenskaya Pravda" on 23 December 1989;
