= Żabieniec, Kuyavian-Pomeranian Voivodeship =

Żabieniec
- Village
- Location within Poland
- Coordinates: 52°43′N 18°48′E
- Country: Poland
- Voivodeship: Kuyavian-Pomeranian
- County: Aleksandrów
- Gmina: Bądkowo

Żabieniec [ʐaˈbjɛɲɛt͡s] is a village in the administrative district of Gmina Bądkowo, within Aleksandrów County, Kuyavian-Pomeranian Voivodeship, in north-central Poland.
