= Waganiec =

- Village
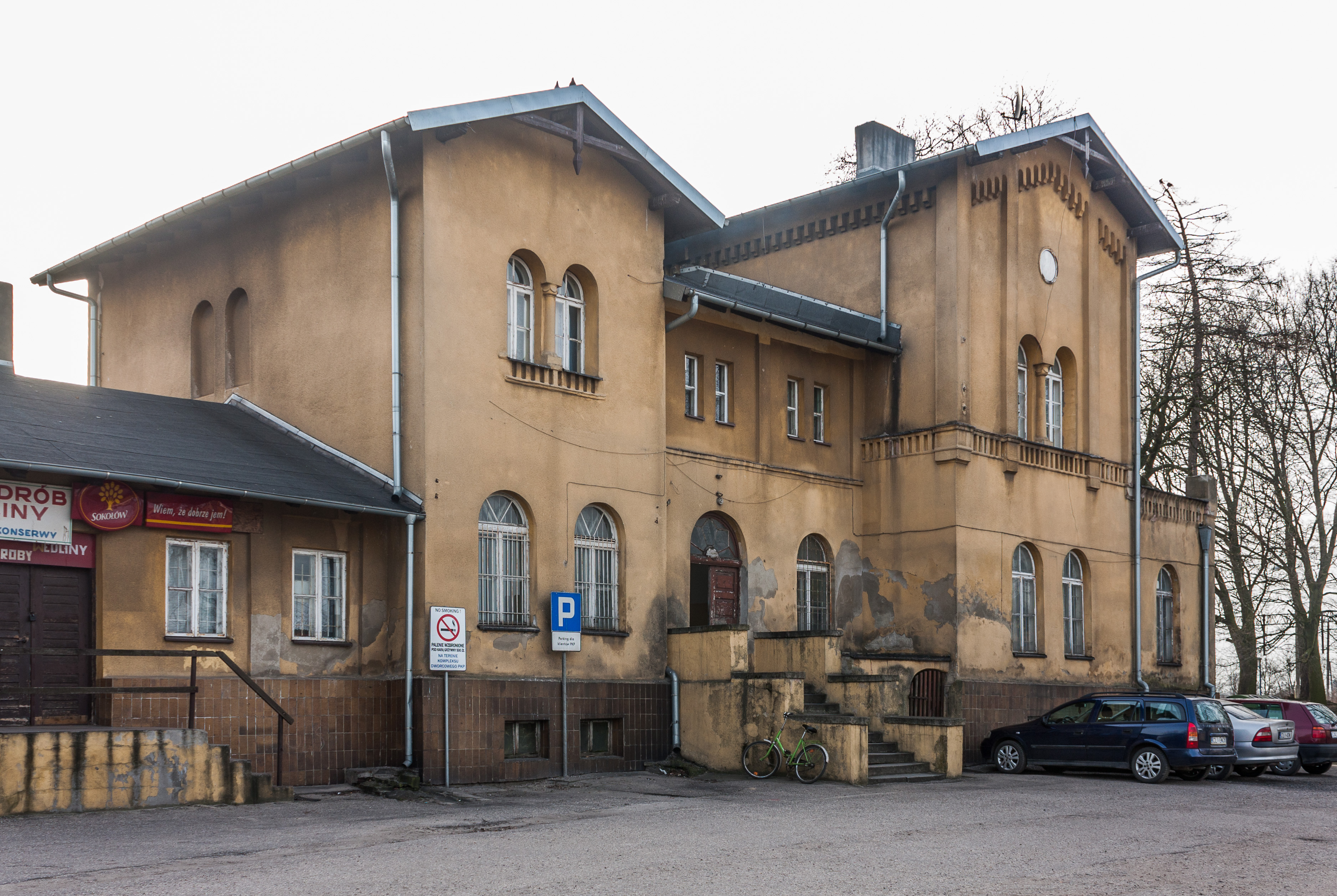
- Train station

- Location within Poland
- Coordinates: 52°49′N 18°51′E
- Country: Poland
- Voivodeship: Kuyavian-Pomeranian
- County: Aleksandrów
- Gmina: Waganiec

Population
  - Total: 1,300

Waganiec [vaˈɡaɲɛt͡s] is a village in Aleksandrów County, Kuyavian-Pomeranian Voivodeship, in north-central Poland. It is the seat of the gmina (administrative district) called Gmina Waganiec.
