= Pomiany, Aleksandrów County =

Pomiany
- Village
- Location within Poland
- Coordinates: 52°45′23″N 18°42′05″E
- Country: Poland
- Voivodeship: Kuyavian-Pomeranian
- County: Aleksandrów
- Gmina: Koneck

Pomiany [pɔˈmjanɨ] is a village in the administrative district of Gmina Koneck, within Aleksandrów County, Kuyavian-Pomeranian Voivodeship, in north-central Poland.
