= Poschła =

- Village
- Location within Poland
- Coordinates: 51°58′30″N 21°36′4″E
- Country: Poland
- Voivodeship: Masovian
- County: Garwolin
- Gmina: Parysów

Poschła [ˈpɔsxwa] is a village in the administrative district of Gmina Parysów, within Garwolin County, Masovian Voivodeship, in east-central Poland.
