= Zakrzewo, Gmina Zakrzewo =

Zakrzewo
- Village
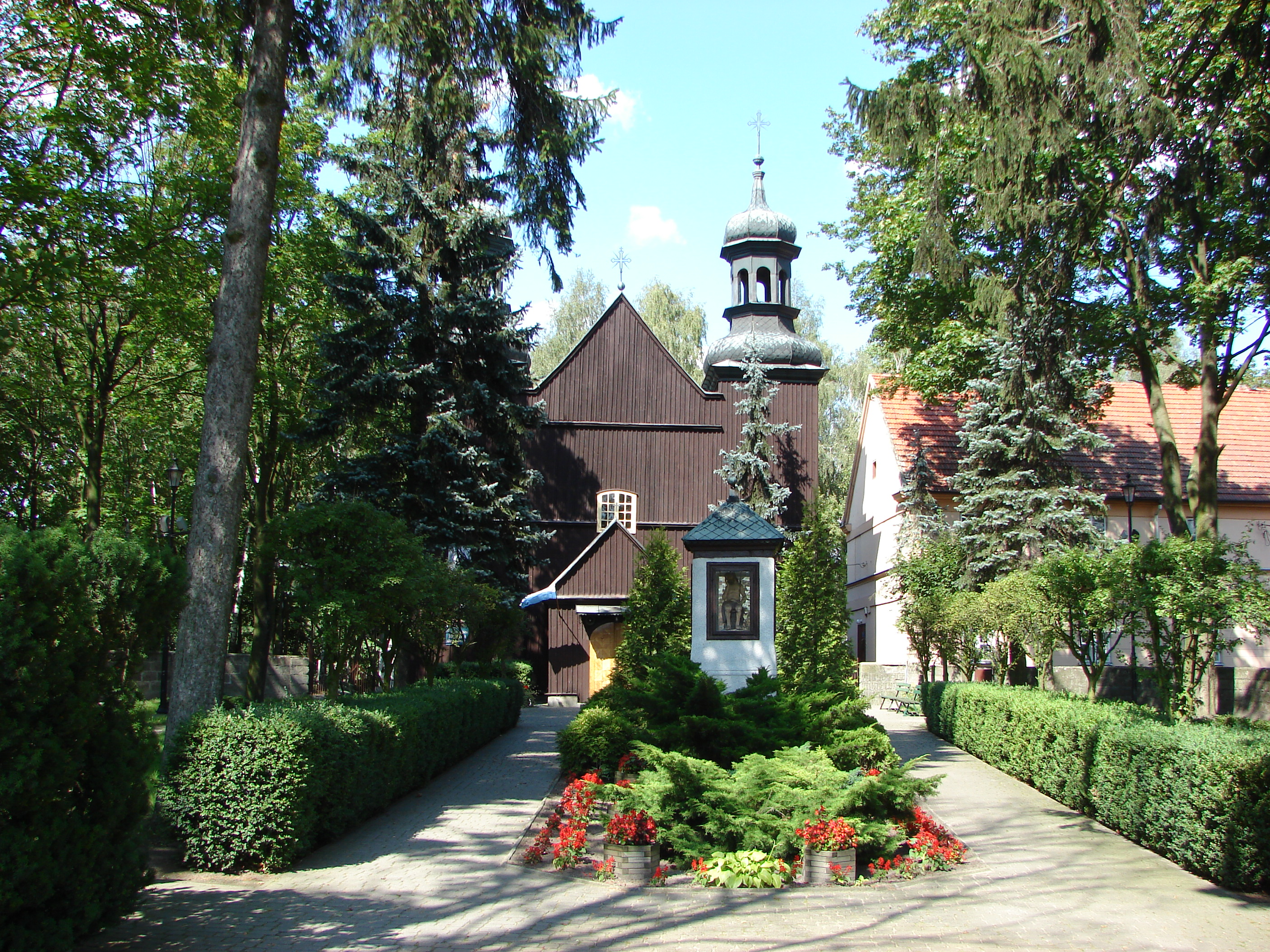
- St. Joseph's wooden church from 1746.

- Location within Poland
- Coordinates: 52°46′N 18°37′E
- Country: Poland
- Voivodeship: Kuyavian-Pomeranian
- County: Aleksandrów
- Gmina: Zakrzewo

Zakrzewo [zaˈkʂɛvɔ] is a village in Aleksandrów County, Kuyavian-Pomeranian Voivodeship, in north-central Poland. It is the seat of the gmina (administrative district) called Gmina Zakrzewo.
