= Raciążek =

- Village
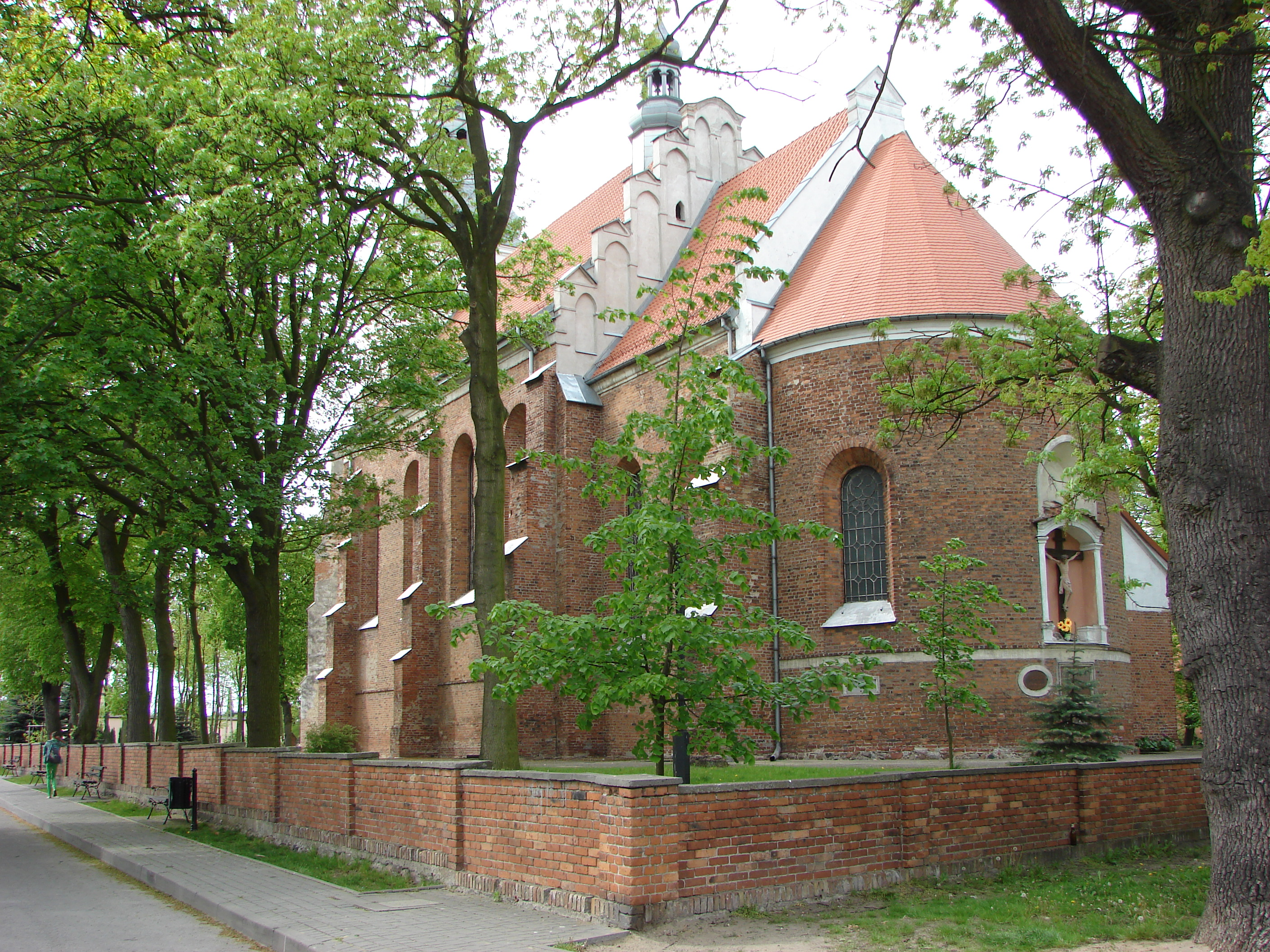
- Church of All Saints and St. Jerome, 16th century.

- Location within Poland
- Coordinates: 52°52′N 18°49′E
- Country: Poland
- Voivodeship: Kuyavian-Pomeranian
- County: Aleksandrów
- Gmina: Raciążek
- Elevation: 80 m (260 ft)

Population
  - Total: 1,601
- Time zone: UTC+1 (CET)
  - Summer (DST): UTC+2 (CEST)
- Vehicle registration: CAL

Raciążek [raˈt͡ɕɔ̃ʐɛk] is a village in Aleksandrów County, Kuyavian-Pomeranian Voivodeship, in north-central Poland. It is the seat of the gmina (administrative district) called Gmina Raciążek. It is located in the region of Kuyavia.

== History ==
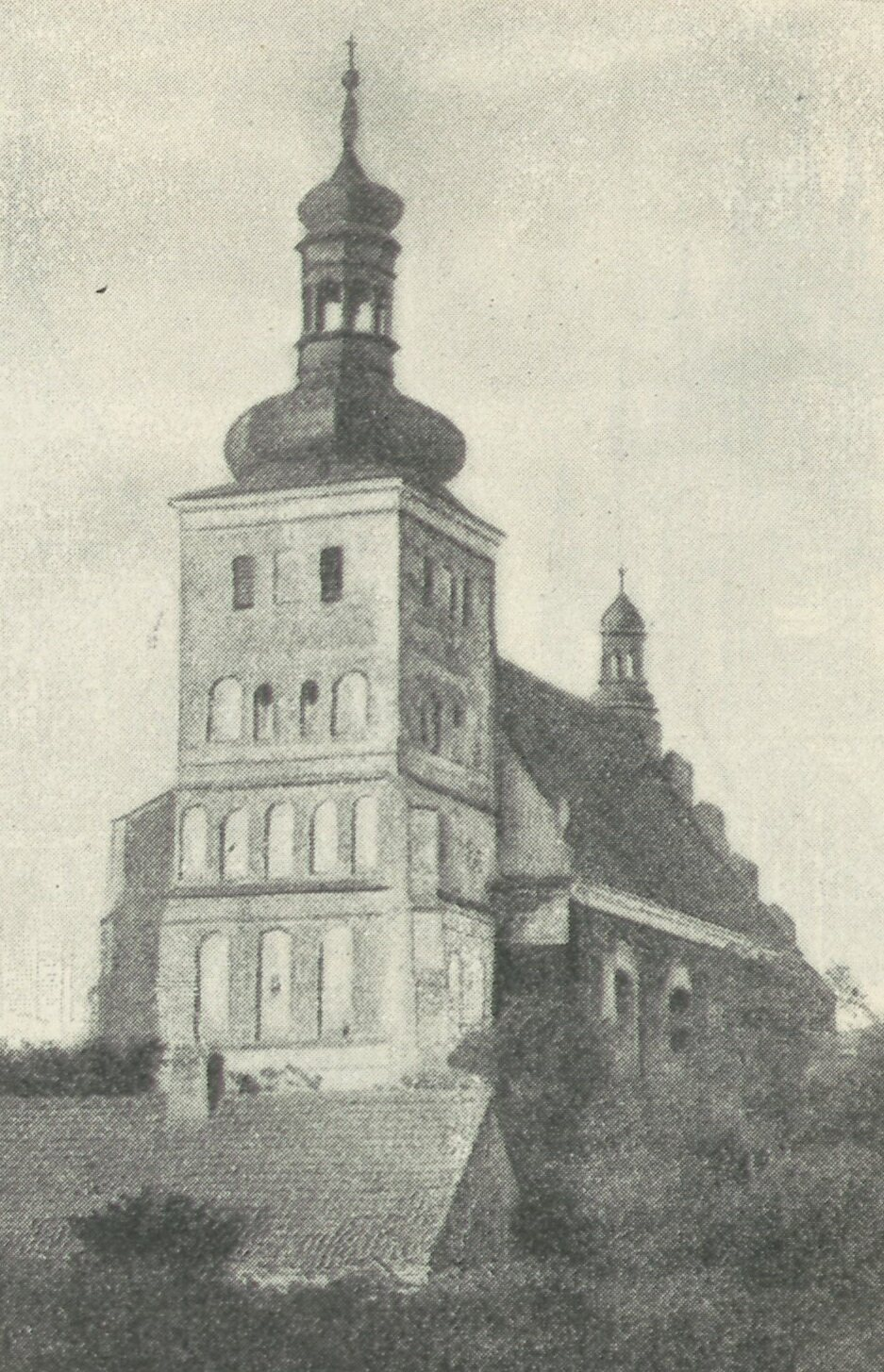
All Saints church circa 1916

Raciążek was a private church town, administratively located in the Inowrocław County in the Inowrocław Voivodeship in the Greater Poland Province of the Kingdom of Poland.

According to the 1921 census, the town had a population of 1,146, entirely Polish by nationality, 97.6% Roman Catholic and 1.8% Lutheran by confession.

Following the German-Soviet invasion of Poland, which started World War II in September 1939, Raciążek was occupied by Germany until 1945.
