= Zbrachlin, Aleksandrów County =

Zbrachlin
- Village
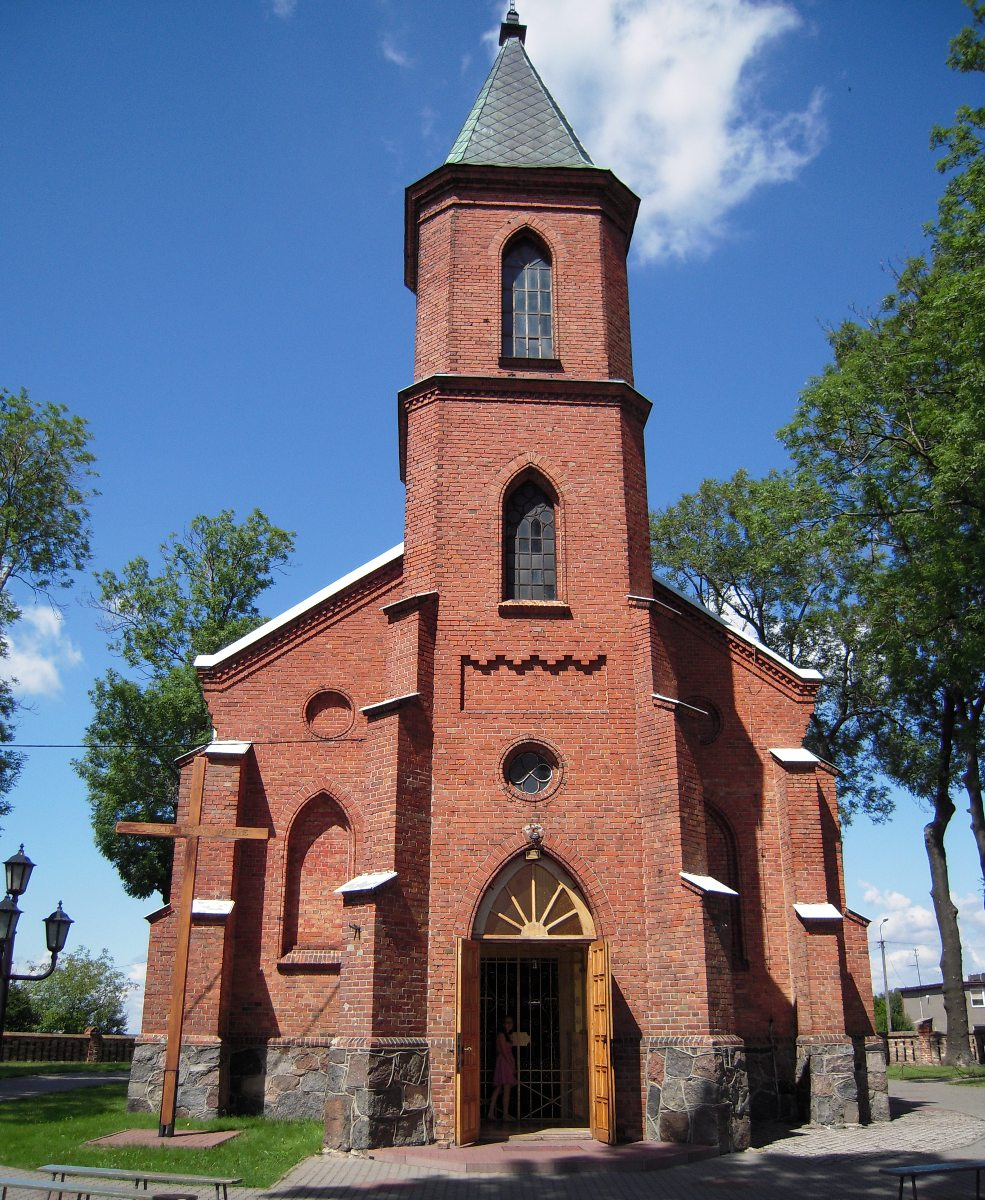
- Church of Saint Adalbert

- Location within Poland
- Coordinates: 52°47′N 18°52′E
- Country: Poland
- Voivodeship: Kuyavian-Pomeranian
- County: Aleksandrów
- Gmina: Waganiec

Zbrachlin [ˈzbraxlin] is a village in the administrative district of Gmina Waganiec, within Aleksandrów County, Kuyavian-Pomeranian Voivodeship, in north-central Poland.
