= Łówkowice =

- Village
- Location within Poland
- Coordinates: 52°45′19″N 18°48′45″E
- Country: Poland
- Voivodeship: Kuyavian-Pomeranian
- County: Aleksandrów
- Gmina: Bądkowo

Łówkowice [wufkɔˈvit͡sɛ] is a village in the administrative district of Gmina Bądkowo, within Aleksandrów County, Kuyavian-Pomeranian Voivodeship, in north-central Poland.
