= Straszewo, Wągrowiec =

- Neighbourhood
- Location within Poland
- Coordinates: 52°48′18.9″N 17°13′15.5″E
- Country: Poland
- Voivodeship: Greater Poland
- County: Wągrowiec County
- Town: Wągrowiec
- Time zone: UTC+1 (CET)
  - Summer (DST): UTC+2 (CEST)
- Postal code: 62-100
- Telephone code: 67
- Vehicle registration: PWA

Straszewo [straˈʂɛvɔ], formerly an independent village, is a neighbourhood in Wągrowiec, Greater Poland Voivodeship, in west-central Poland.

Initially called Jasiniak, it used to belong in the middle ages to the Łekno Cistercian monastery. It is currently the most populous residential neighbourhood of the town.
