= Straszewo, Podlaskie Voivodeship =

Straszewo
- Village
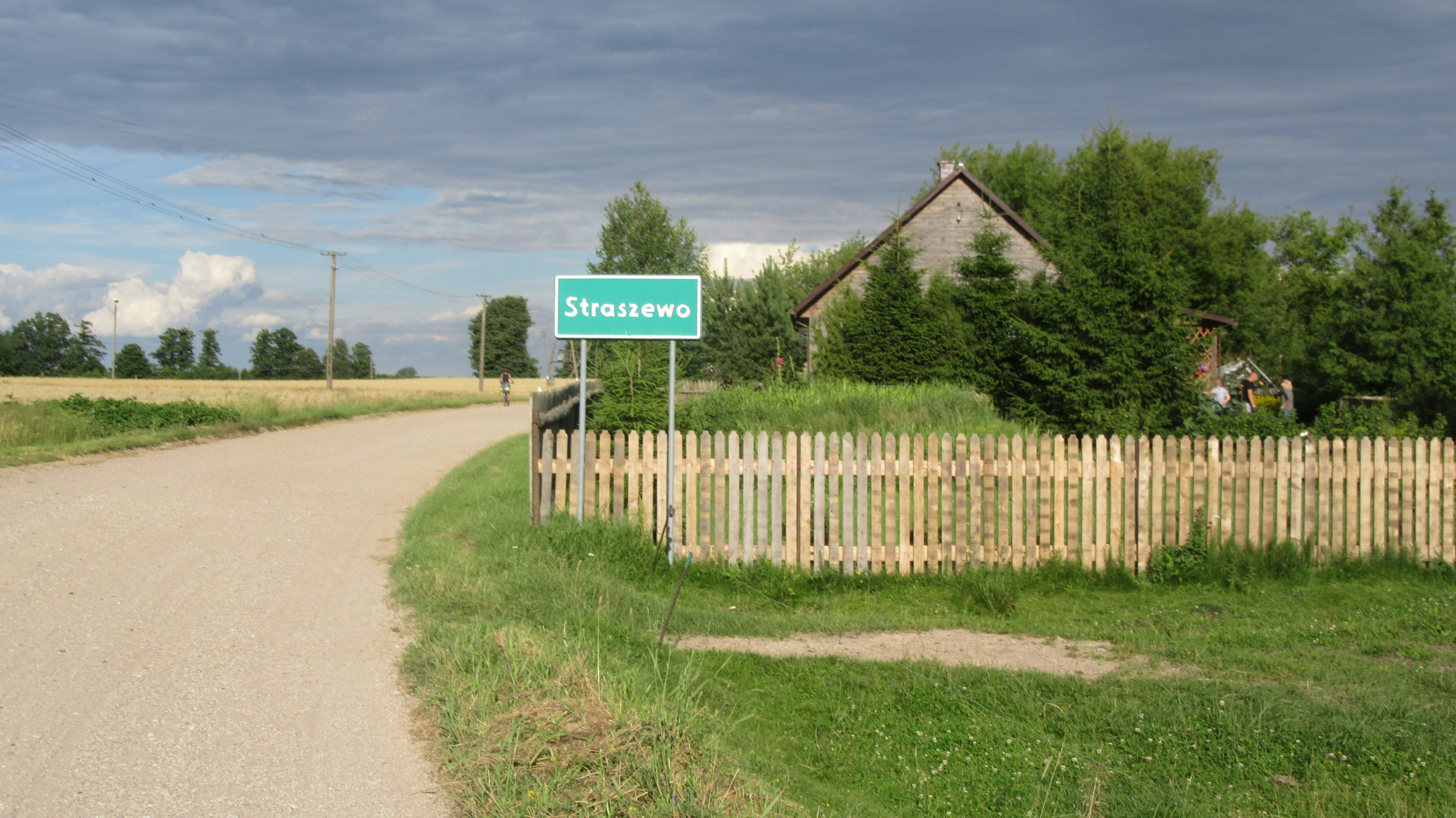

- Location within Poland
- Coordinates: 53°6′N 23°44′E
- Country: Poland
- Voivodeship: Podlaskie
- County: Białystok
- Gmina: Gródek

Straszewo [straˈʂɛvɔ] is a village in the administrative district of Gmina Gródek, within Białystok County, Podlaskie Voivodeship, in north-eastern Poland, close to the border with Belarus.

== Born ==
- Aliaksei Karpiuk (1920–1992) - Belarusian writer and public activist.
