= Żabieniec, Garwolin County =

Żabieniec
- Village
- Location within Poland
- Coordinates: 51°57′N 21°39′E
- Country: Poland
- Voivodeship: Masovian
- County: Garwolin
- Gmina: Parysów

Żabieniec [ʐaˈbjɛɲɛt͡s] is a village in the administrative district of Gmina Parysów, within Garwolin County, Masovian Voivodeship, in east-central Poland.
