= Starowola, Garwolin County =

Starowola
- Village
- Location within Poland
- Coordinates: 51°59′N 21°44′E
- Country: Poland
- Voivodeship: Masovian
- County: Garwolin
- Gmina: Parysów

Starowola [starɔˈvɔla] is a village in the administrative district of Gmina Parysów, within Garwolin County, Masovian Voivodeship, in east-central Poland.
