= Aleksandrów Kujawski =

- Town
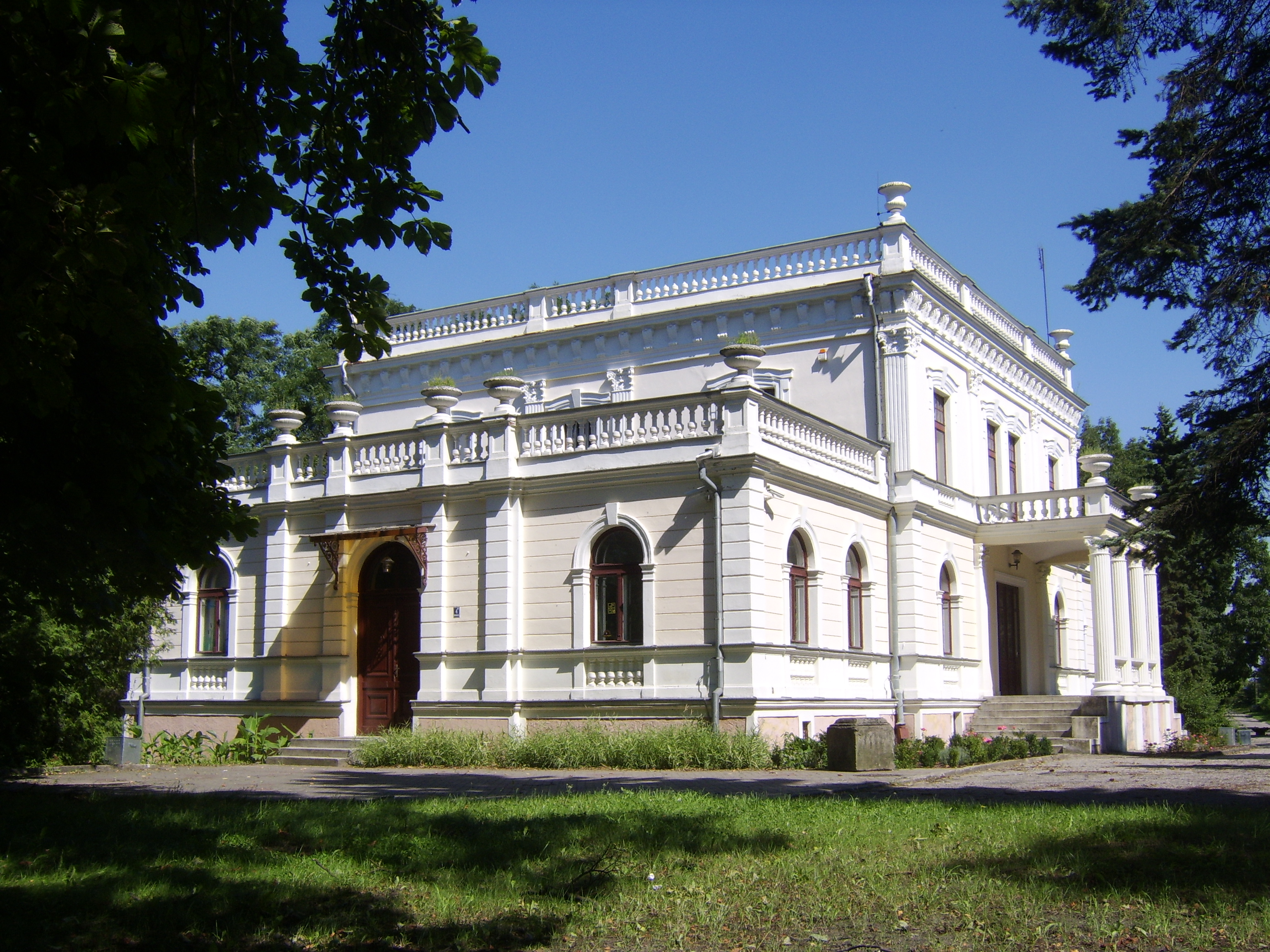
- Trojanowski Palace in Aleksandrów Kujawski

- Flag Coat of arms

- Location within Poland
- Coordinates: 52°52′36″N 18°41′37″E
- Country: Poland
- Voivodeship: Kuyavian-Pomeranian
- County: Aleksandrów
- Gmina: Aleksandrów Kujawski (urban gmina)

Government
  - Mayor: Arkadiusz Gralak (PSL)

Area
  - Total: 7.23 km^{2} (2.79 sq mi)

Population (31 December 2022)
  - Total: 11,536
  - Density: 1,595.6/km^{2} (4,133/sq mi)
- Time zone: UTC+1 (CET)
  - Summer (DST): UTC+2 (CEST)
- Postal codes: 87-700, 87-712
- Area code: +48 54
- Number plates: CAL
- Website: http://www.aleksandrowkujawski.pl

Aleksandrów Kujawski [alɛkˈsandruf kuˈjafskʲi] (until 1879: Trojanów, 1879–1919: Aleksandrów Pograniczny) is a town in north-central Poland, in Kuyavian-Pomeranian Voivodeship. It is the seat of Aleksandrów County, as well as of Gmina Aleksandrów Kujawski (although it is not part of the territory of that gmina). It is situated about 18 km (11 mi) south-east of Toruń. As of December 2022 Aleksandrów Kujawski has an area of 7.23 km^{2} (2.79 sq mi) and a population of 11,536.

== History ==
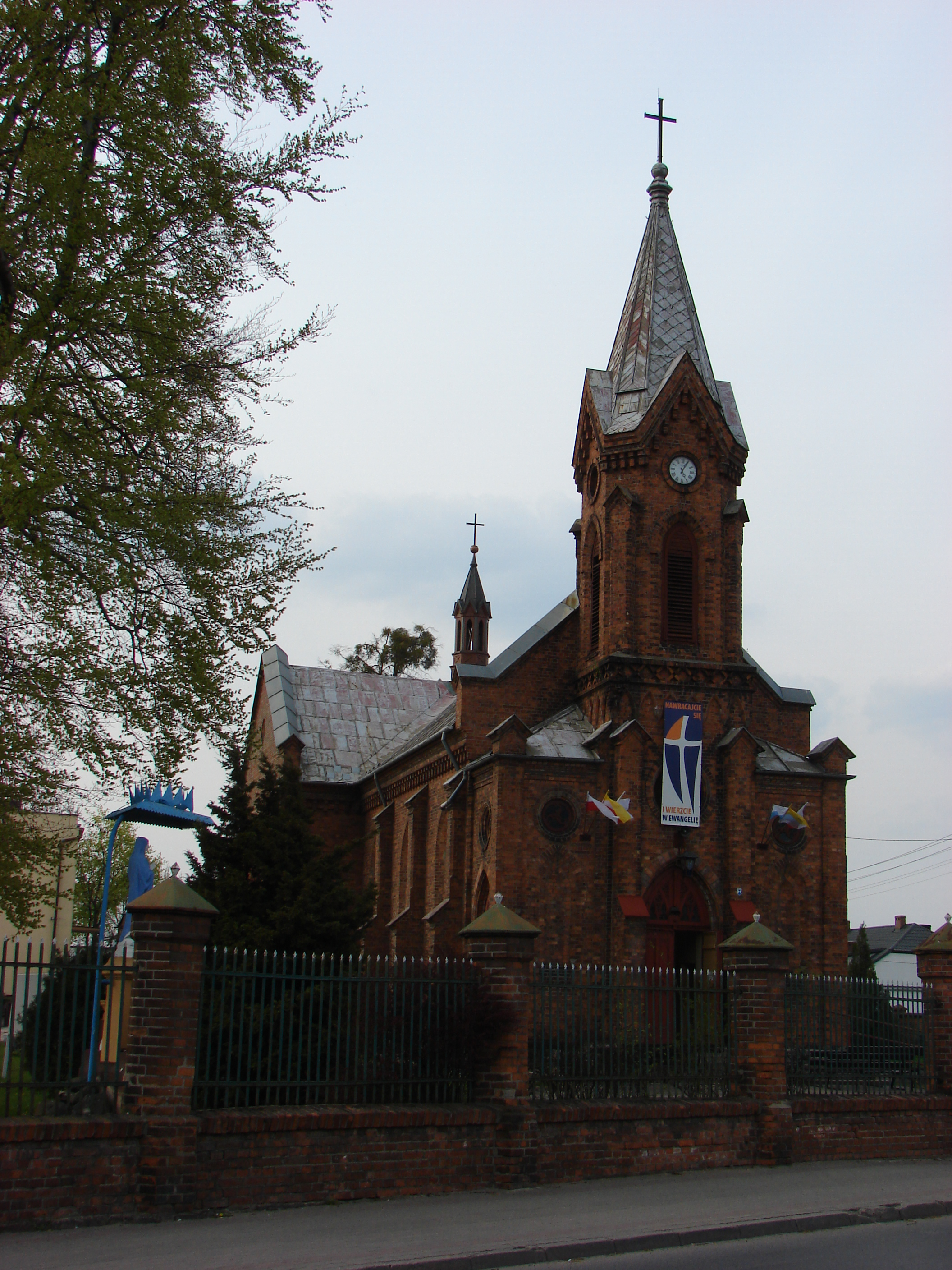
Transfiguration Church

The Trojanów train station, which was established in the course of the construction of the railway line from Kutno to Toruń between 1859 and 1865, was the nucleus of the town, which was founded in 1862. Equally important was its location near the border of the Russian Empire (Congress Poland/Russian Partition) with the Kingdom of Prussia (Prussian Partition, from 1871 part of the German Empire). In 1879, a meeting between the Russian Emperor Alexander II and the German Emperor William I took place here. On this occasion, the place was renamed Aleksandrowo and received municipal rights. It was later renamed Aleksandrów Pograniczny ("Aleksandrów on the border").

The town received its current name in 1919 after Poland was restored as an independent state. According to the 1921 census, the town had a population of 8,193, 89.3% Polish and 9.0% Jewish. In the years 1921–1923 there was an internment camp for soldiers of the Ukrainian People's Republic in Aleksandrów Kujawski. In 1932, Aleksandrów Kujawski became the seat of the Nieszawa county, which on April 1, 1938, became part of the Pomeranian Voivodeship in the Second Polish Republic.

During the German occupation of Poland, between October 1939 and January 1940 Germans murdered many Poles from the town in the nearby Odolion forest (see Nazi crimes against the Polish nation). In October 1939, Germans arrested five Salesians from the town, and in 1940 they expelled 735 Poles, whose houses, workshops and offices were then handed over to German colonists as part of the Lebensraum policy.

Between 1975 and 1998 the town was a part of Włocławek Voivodeship.

== Demographics ==
Historical population

Year	Pop.	±%
1910	11,464	—
1921	8,236	−28.2%
1931	11,554	+40.3%

Year	Pop.	±%
1939	13,333	+15.4%
1950	8,816	−33.9%
1960	12,179	+38.1%

== Municipal parts ==
- Centrum
- Osiedle Parkowa I
- Osiedle Parkowa II
- Piaski (Piachy)
- Halinowo
- Osiedle Południe

== Transport ==
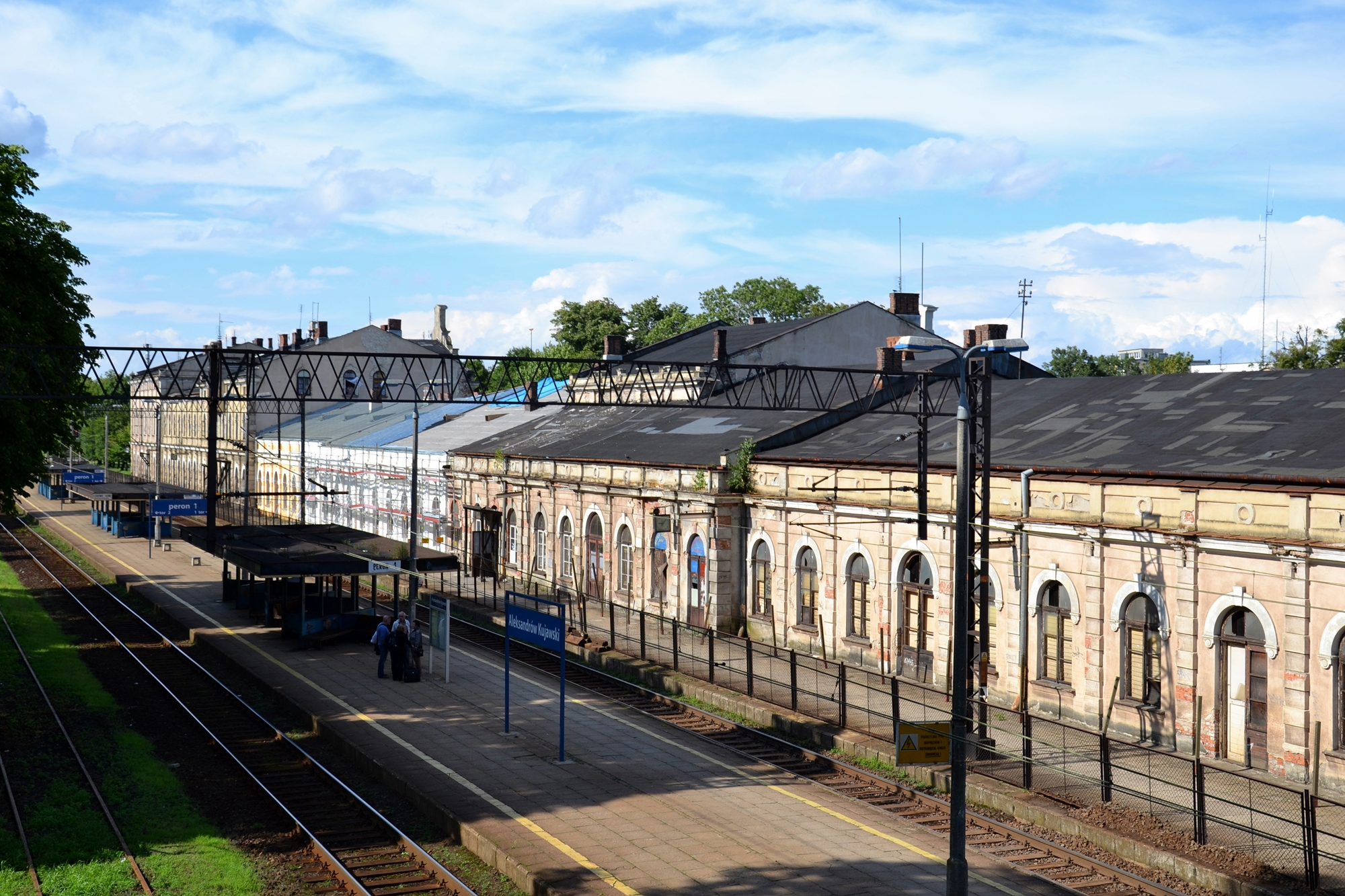
Aleksandrów Kujawski railway station

=== Road transport ===
Voivodeship road 266 (Konin–Ciechocinek) directly passes through the town. The A1 motorway, which is a part of the european route E75, passes about 3 km (1.9 mi) to the east of the town.

=== Rail transport ===
Railway lines 18 and 245 pass through the town. The town has a railway station.

== See also ==
- Stadion Miejski (Aleksandrów Kujawski)
