= Aleksandrów County =

Aleksandrów County Powiat aleksandrowski
- County
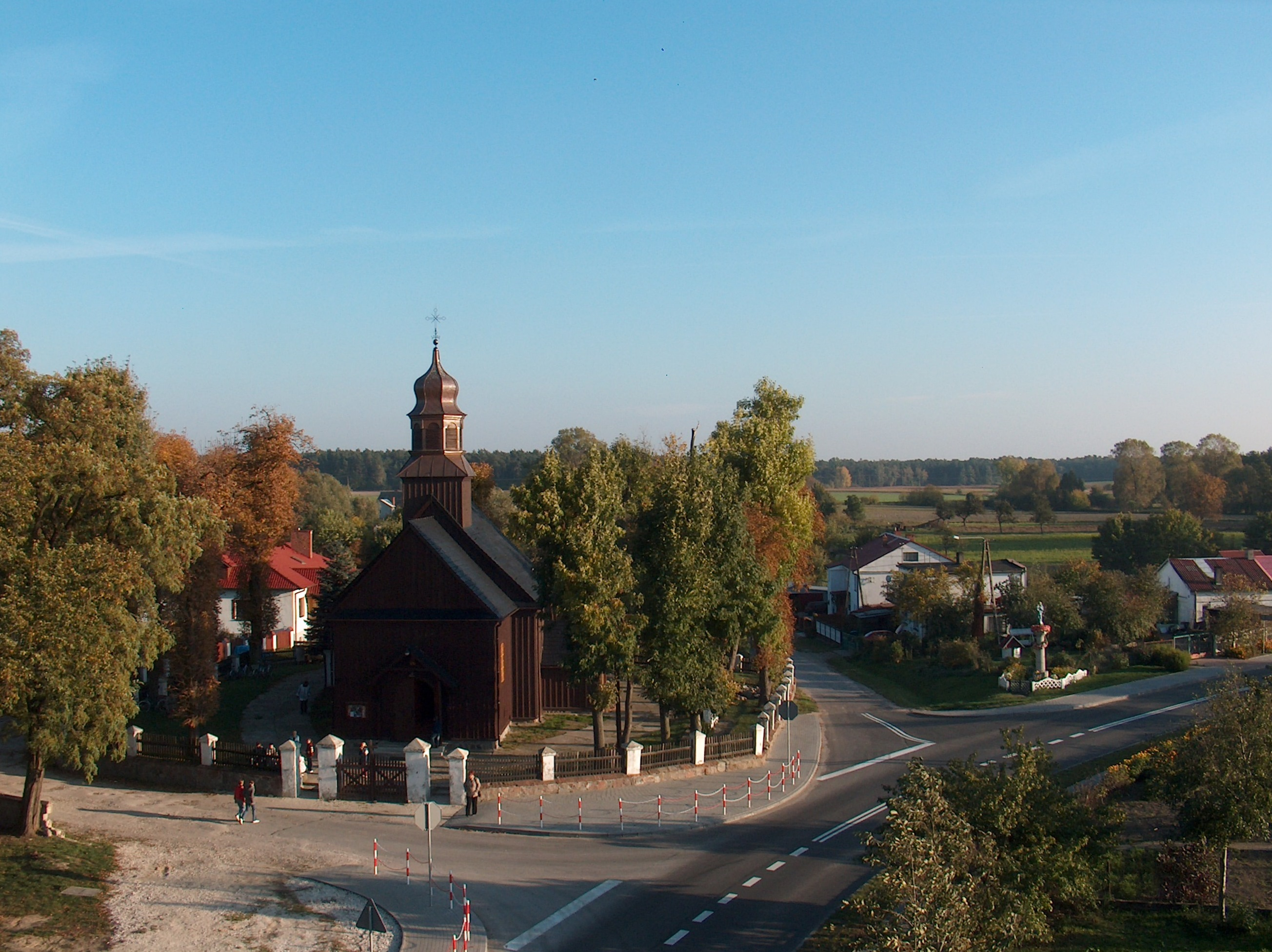

- Flag Coat of arms

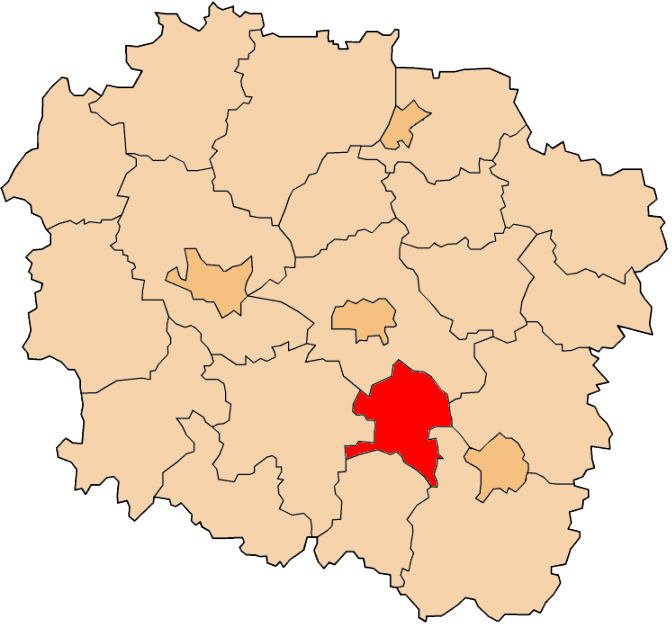
- Location within the voivodeship
- Coordinates (Aleksandrów Kujawski): 52°52′N 18°42′E
- Country: Poland
- Voivodeship: Kuyavian-Pomeranian
- Seat: Aleksandrów Kujawski
- Gminas: Total 9 (incl. 3 urban): Aleksandrów Kujawski; Ciechocinek; Nieszawa; Gmina Aleksandrów Kujawski; Gmina Bądkowo; Gmina Koneck; Gmina Raciążek; Gmina Waganiec; Gmina Zakrzewo

Area
  - Total: 475.61 km^{2} (183.63 sq mi)

Population (2019)
  - Total: 55,150
  - Density: 116.0/km^{2} (300.3/sq mi)
  - Urban: 24,590
  - Rural: 30,560
- Car plates: CAL
- Website: www.aleksandrow.pl

Aleksandrów County (Polish: powiat aleksandrowski) is a unit of territorial administration and local government (powiat) in Kuyavian-Pomeranian Voivodeship, north-central Poland. It came into being on January 1, 1999, as a result of the Polish local government reforms passed in 1998. Its administrative seat and largest town is Aleksandrów Kujawski, which lies 20 km (12 mi) south of Toruń and 55 km (34 mi) south-east of Bydgoszcz. The county also contains the towns of Ciechocinek, lying 6 km (4 mi) east of Aleksandrów Kujawski, and Nieszawa, 14 km (9 mi) east of Aleksandrów Kujawski.

The county covers an area of 475.61 square kilometres (183.6 sq mi). As of 2010 its total population is 55,352, out of which the population of Aleksandrów Kujawski is 12,359, that of Ciechocinek is 10,855, that of Nieszawa is 2,012, and the rural population is 29,969.

== Neighbouring counties ==
Aleksandrów County is bordered by Toruń County to the north, Lipno County to the east, Włocławek County to the south-east, Radziejów County to the south and Inowrocław County to the west.

== Administrative divisions ==
The county is subdivided into nine gminas (three urban and six rural). These are listed in the following table, in descending order of population.

Gmina	Type	Area (km^{2})	Population (2019)	Seat
Aleksandrów Kujawski	urban	7.2	12,147	
Gmina Aleksandrów Kujawski	rural	131.6	11,891	Aleksandrów Kujawski *
Ciechocinek	urban	15.3	10,590	
Gmina Bądkowo	rural	79.7	4,275	Bądkowo
Gmina Waganiec	rural	54.6	4,573	Waganiec
Gmina Zakrzewo	rural	76.1	3,509	Zakrzewo
Gmina Koneck	rural	68.1	3,145	Koneck
Gmina Raciążek	rural	32.9	3,167	Raciążek
Nieszawa	urban	9.8	1,853	
* seat not part of the gmina
