= Optimo (disambiguation) =

Optimo may refer to:

- Optimo Espacio, night club in Glasgow, Scotland
- Optimo (EP), a 1983 EP by post-punk band Liquid Liquid
- Optimo cigars, made by Swisher International Group
- Deo optimo maximo, Latin phrase meaning "to the greatest and best God"
- De optimo senatore, Latin treatise by Wawrzyniec Goślicki published in 1568
- Caetano Optimo, minibus manufactured by Salvador Caetano
