= Opoki =

Opoki may refer to:

- Opoki, Poland, a village in Poland
- Opoki, Russia, name of several rural localities in Russia
