= Zduny (disambiguation) =

Zduny is a town in Greater Poland Voivodeship, west-central Poland.

Zduny may also refer to:

- Zduny, Kalisz County in Greater Poland Voivodeship, Poland
- Zduny, Aleksandrów County in Kuyavian-Pomeranian Voivodeship (north-central Poland)
- Zduny, Brodnica County in Kuyavian-Pomeranian Voivodeship (north-central Poland)
- Zduny, Łęczyca County in Łódź Voivodeship (central Poland)
- Zduny, Łowicz County in Łódź Voivodeship (central Poland)
- Zduny, Pomeranian Voivodeship (north Poland)
- Zduny, Warmian-Masurian Voivodeship (north Poland)
- Zduny, West Pomeranian Voivodeship (north-west Poland)
