= Konradowo =

Konradowo may refer to the following places:

- Konradowo, Kuyavian-Pomeranian Voivodeship (north-central Poland)
- Konradowo, Nowa Sól County in Lubusz Voivodeship (west Poland)
- Konradowo, Wschowa County in Lubusz Voivodeship (west Poland)
- Konradowo, Pomeranian Voivodeship (north Poland)
- Konradowo, Warmian-Masurian Voivodeship (north Poland)
