= Niemojewo =

Niemojewo may refer to:

- Niemojewo, Brodnica County, Poland
- Niemojewo, Włocławek County, Poland
