= Chlebowo =

Chlebowo may refer to the following places:

- Chlebowo, Brodnica County in Kuyavian-Pomeranian Voivodeship (north-central Poland)
- Chlebowo, Lipno County in Kuyavian-Pomeranian Voivodeship (north-central Poland)
- Chlebowo, Masovian Voivodeship (east-central Poland)
- Chlebowo, Konin County in Greater Poland Voivodeship (west-central Poland)
- Chlebowo, Oborniki County in Greater Poland Voivodeship (west-central Poland)
- Chlebowo, Września County in Greater Poland Voivodeship (west-central Poland)
- Chlebowo, Pomeranian Voivodeship (north Poland)
- Chlebowo, Lubusz Voivodeship (west Poland)
- Chlebowo, Drawsko County in West Pomeranian Voivodeship (north-west Poland)
- Chlebowo, Gryfino County in West Pomeranian Voivodeship (north-west Poland)
- Chlebowo, Koszalin County in West Pomeranian Voivodeship (north-west Poland)
- Chlebowo, Stargard County in West Pomeranian Voivodeship (north-west Poland)
