= Grabie, Kuyavian-Pomeranian Voivodeship =

Grabie
- Village
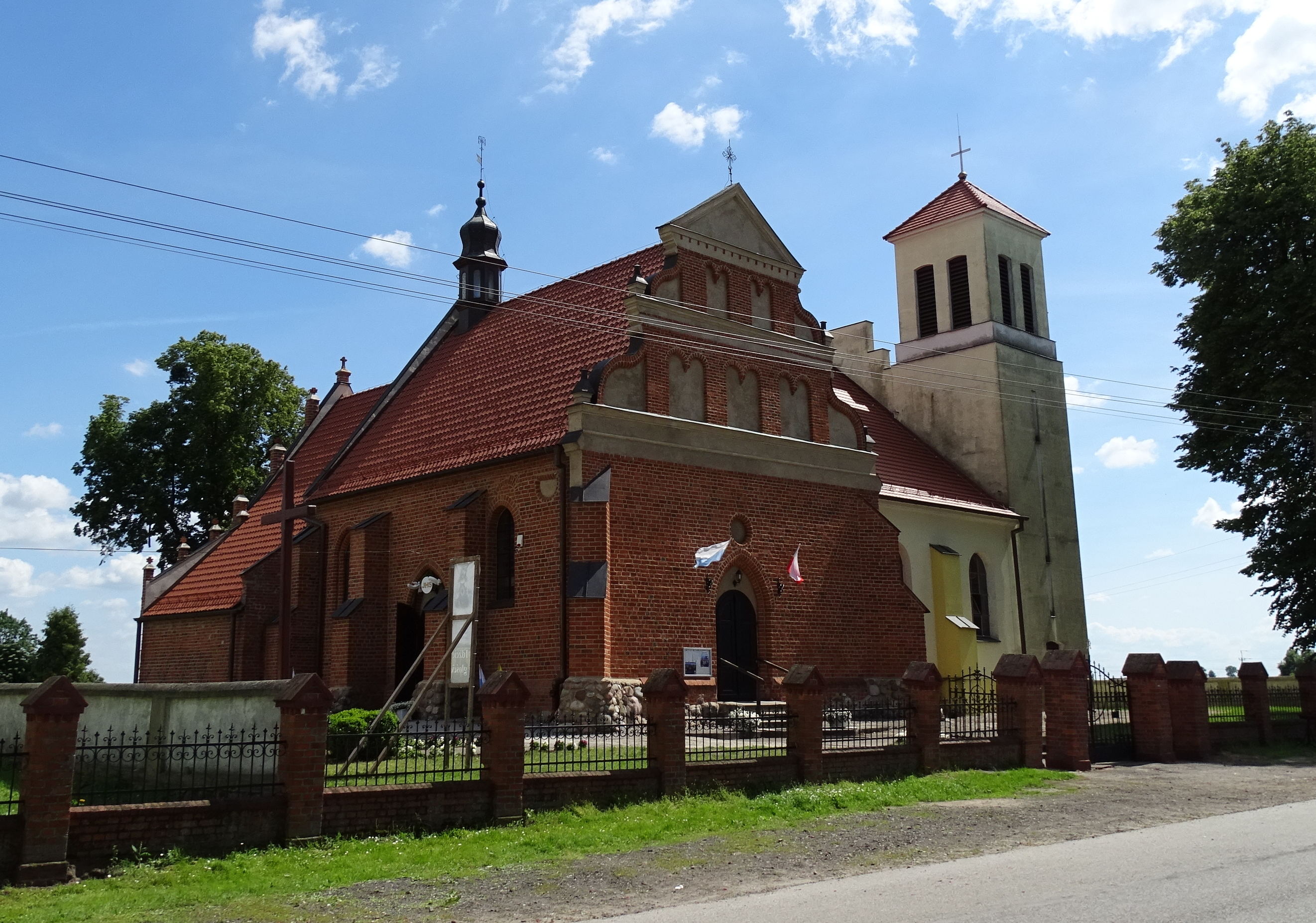
- Church of St Wenceslaus

- Location within Poland
- Coordinates: 52°50′58″N 18°34′13″E
- Country: Poland
- Voivodeship: Kuyavian-Pomeranian
- County: Aleksandrów
- Gmina: Aleksandrów Kujawski
- Population: 241
- Time zone: UTC+1 (CET)
  - Summer (DST): UTC+2 (CEST)
- Vehicle registration: CAL

Grabie [ˈɡrabʲɛ] is a village in the administrative district of Gmina Aleksandrów Kujawski, within Aleksandrów County, Kuyavian-Pomeranian Voivodeship, in north-central Poland. It is located in the region of Kuyavia.

== History ==
During the German occupation of Poland (World War II), in 1939–1940, the occupiers carried out expulsions of Poles, whose farms were then handed over to Germans as part of the Lebensraum policy. Expelled Poles were either deported to the General Government in the more eastern part of German-occupied Poland or enslaved as forced labour of German colonists in the area.

== Sights ==
Landmarks of Grabie are the Gothic Church of St. Wenceslaus from the 14th century and the local palace, former residence of Polish botanist, painter and art collector Michał Hieronim Leszczyc-Sumiński, which now houses a nursing home.
