= Świedziebnia =

- Village
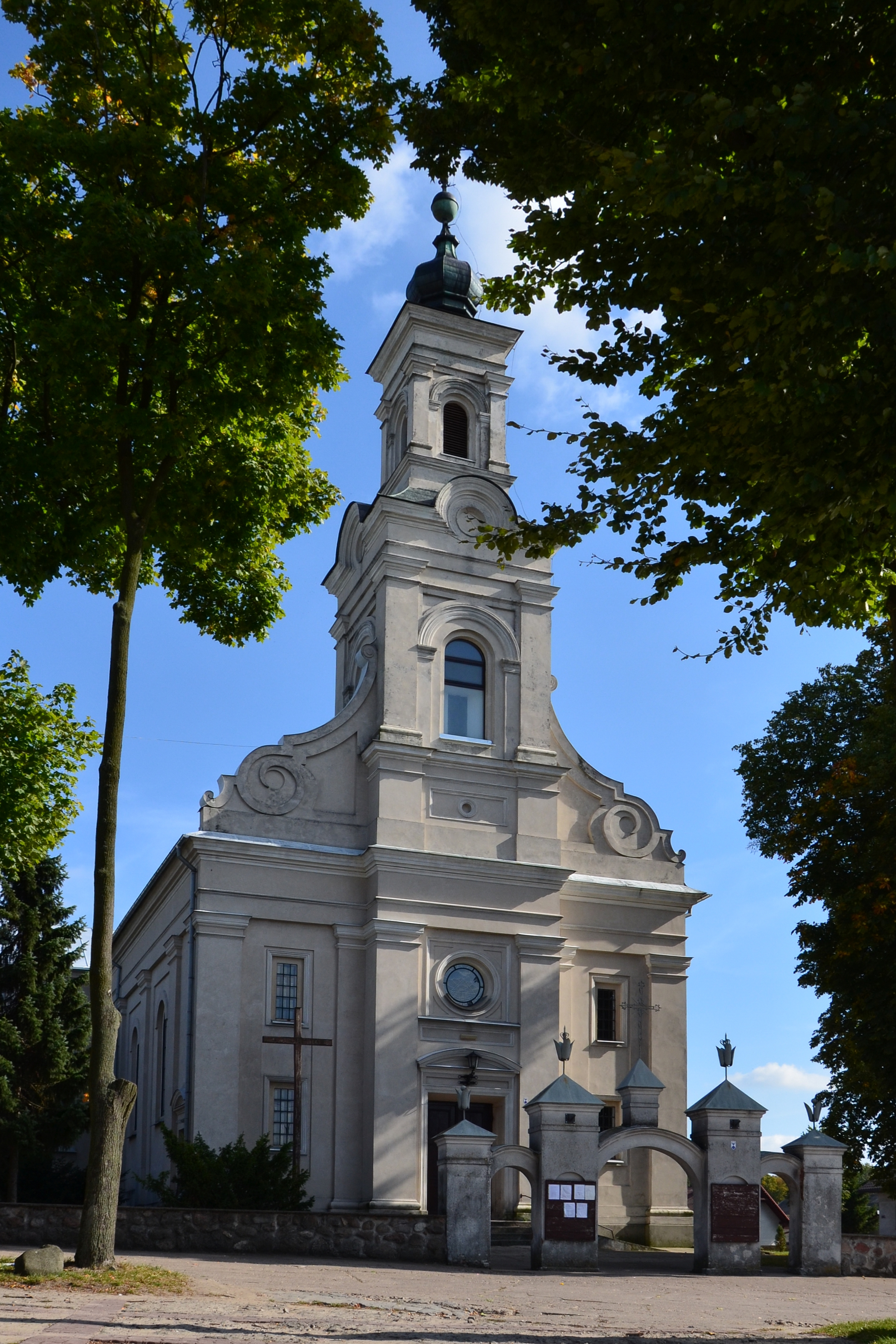
- Exaltation of the Holy Cross church in Świedziebnia

- Location within Poland
- Coordinates: 53°9′N 19°33′E
- Country: Poland
- Voivodeship: Kuyavian-Pomeranian
- County: Brodnica
- Gmina: Świedziebnia
- Time zone: UTC+1 (CET)
  - Summer (DST): UTC+2 (CEST)
- Vehicle registration: CBR

Świedziebnia (Polish: [ɕfjɛˈd͡ʑɛbɲa]) is a village in Brodnica County, Kuyavian-Pomeranian Voivodeship, in north-central Poland. It is the seat of the gmina (administrative district) called Gmina Świedziebnia.

== History ==
Świedziebnia was a private village of Polish nobility, including the Murzynowski family, administratively located in the Dobrzyń Land in the Inowrocław Voivodeship in the Greater Poland Province of the Kingdom of Poland. By 1564, there was a Catholic church and parish in the village.

During the Partitions of Poland, it was annexed by Prussia, and then in 1807 it was regained by Poles and included within the short-lived Polish Duchy of Warsaw. Following the duchy's dissolution in 1815, the village fell to the Russian Partition of Poland. In 1827, Świedziebnia had a population of 228. During the Polish November Uprising, on October 2, 1831, the main insurgent command was moved to Świedziebnia. The next day, the Polish War Council decided there that further fighting was pointless, and that the surviving insurgents would cross the nearby border with the Prussian Partition and thus flee the Russian Partition. Józef Niemojewski, Polish general of the Kościuszko Uprising and Napoleonic Wars, is buried in the village. Following World War I, Poland regained independence and control of the village.

Following the joint German-Soviet invasion of Poland, which started World War II in September 1939, the village was occupied by Germany. Local teachers were among Polish teachers from the county deceitfully gathered at a supposed formal meeting and massacred by the Germans in Rypin in November 1939 (see Intelligenzaktion). In 1941, the German gendarmerie, Einsatzkompanie Thorn and Einsatzkompanie Gotenhafen carried out expulsions of Poles, whose houses and farms were then handed over to German colonists as part of the Lebensraum policy. Expelled Poles were placed in the Potulice concentration camp and then either enslaved as forced labour of new German colonists in the county or deported to the General Government in the more eastern part of German-occupied Poland.

== Sports ==
The local football club is LZS Świedziebnia. It competes in the lower leagues.
