= Michałki =

Michałki may refer to:

- Michałki, Brodnica County in Kuyavian-Pomeranian Voivodeship (north-central Poland)
- Michałki, Wąbrzeźno County in Kuyavian-Pomeranian Voivodeship (north-central Poland)
- Michałki, Lublin Voivodeship (east Poland)
- Michałki, Podlaskie Voivodeship (north-east Poland)
- Michałki, Masovian Voivodeship (east-central Poland)
- Michałki, Nidzica County in Warmian-Masurian Voivodeship (north Poland)
- Michałki, Szczytno County in Warmian-Masurian Voivodeship (north Poland)
