= Plebanka =

Plebanka may refer to the following places:

- Plebanka, Gmina Aleksandrów Kujawski in Kuyavian-Pomeranian Voivodeship (north-central Poland)
- Plebanka, Gmina Waganiec in Kuyavian-Pomeranian Voivodeship (north-central Poland)
- Plebanka, Radziejów County in Kuyavian-Pomeranian Voivodeship (north-central Poland)
- Plebanka, Wąbrzeźno County in Kuyavian-Pomeranian Voivodeship (north-central Poland)
- Plebanka, Więcbork in Kuyavian-Pomeranian Voivodeship (north-central Poland)
- Plebanka, Lublin Voivodeship (south-east Poland)
- Plebanka, Masovian Voivodeship (east-central Poland)
