= Edward Stachura =

Polish poet, writer and translator

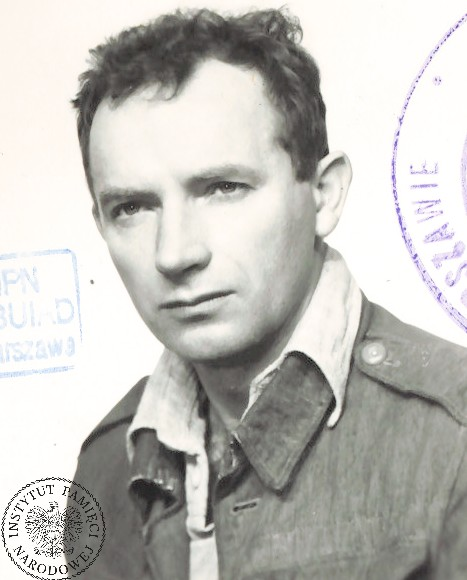
- Edward Stachura
- Born: 18 August 1937; Charvieu, France
- Died: 24 July 1979 (aged 41); Warsaw, Poland
- Occupations: Poet; writer; translator
- Writing career
- Language: Polish
- Notable awards: Stanisław Piętak Prize (1968); Stanisław Piętak Prize (1971); The Kościelski Prize (1972)

Edward Stachura [ˈɛdvard sta'xura] (18 August 1937 – 24 July 1979) was a Polish poet, writer and translator. He rose to prominence in the 1960s, receiving prizes for both poetry and prose. His literary output includes four volumes of poetry, three collections of short stories, two novels, a book of essays, and the final work, Fabula rasa, which is difficult to classify. In addition to writing, Stachura translated literature from Spanish and French, most notably works of Jorge Luis Borges, Gaston Miron and Michel Deguy. He also wrote songs, and occasionally performed them. He died by suicide at the age of forty-one.

== Life and writing ==
=== Childhood and adolescence ===
Edward Stachura was born on 18 August 1937 to a family of Polish emigrants in Charvieu-Chavagneux, department of Isère, in eastern France. He was the second of four children of Stanisław and Jadwiga Stachura (née Stępkowska) who met in France after having emigrated in the early 1920s in search of work.

Stachura spent the first eleven years of his life in France. The family lived in a large tenement house shared by a multilingual mix of emigrants; Stachura would later describe it in his first novel as "this great Tenement of Babel, where apart from the Poles, who called the tune, there was a mass of Greeks, Albanians, Armenians, Italians, Arabs, and other representatives of nations." Stachura attended a French school and, once a week, the Polish school, a teacher having been provided by the consulate. His brother Ryszard, eight years his senior, says that young Edward was courteous, caring, and likeable, but unusually stubborn: in school he had a habit of correcting his teachers if their ideas were at odds with those he got from other sources.

In 1948 the family moved to Poland and settled down in a one-room thatched house in the village of Łazieniec near Aleksandrów Kujawski, the mother's inheritance. Stachura finished grade school in Aleksandrów Kujawski in 1952, completing the program in just three years, even though, according to his mother, his skills in Polish were at first inadequate. He began high school in Ciechocinek. Originally Stachura planned a career in electrical engineering, and he also liked biology and geography, but his interests gradually shifted toward the visual arts and literature. Following conflicts with the school and with his father, Stachura moved to join his brother in Gdynia where he finished high school, graduating in 1956. During that time he published his first poems. After an unsuccessful attempt at enrolling in an arts college, he returned home, working menial jobs, writing poetry, and corresponding with other young writers. He then moved to Toruń, where he attended lectures in the art department at Nicolaus Copernicus University, and participated in the literary movement of the city.

=== College and first book publications ===
Stachura enrolled at the Catholic University of Lublin in 1957, majoring in French Philology. Struggling with difficult financial conditions, he continued writing and actively seeking opportunities to publish his works. He interrupted his studies at CUL twice, and after travelling around the country in 1959 and 1960 he finally transferred to the University of Warsaw, his move to the capital motivated primarily by a desire to facilitate the publication of his work. He continued writing, publishing poetry in periodicals, and he engaged actively in the life of the literary milieu. The year 1962 marked two important events in Stachura's life: the first book publication—a collection of short stories titled Jeden dzień (One Day); and his marriage to Zyta Anna Bartkowska—the future author of novels and short stories published under the pseudonym of Zyta Oryszyn. The following year Stachura published his first book of poetry, Dużo ognia (Lots of Fire). Despite continuing financial difficulties, he graduated in 1965 with a master's degree in Romance Philology; his thesis discussed the work of Henri Michaux.

=== Maturity and critical recognition ===
The years following the graduation saw a flowering of Stachura's work. The second collection of short stories, Falując na wietrze (Waving in the Wind), was published in 1966. The book received the annual Prize of the Polish Publishers' Association. Around that time, Stachura also began a type of journal in which he collected various notes, many of which he would later incorporate into his works. Two books of poetry followed in 1968: Przystępuję do ciebie (I Come Close to You) and Po ogrodzie niech hula szarańcza (Let the Locust Hold Sway in the Garden); the latter received the prestigious Stanisław Piętak Prize. In 1969 Stachura published his first novel, Cała jaskrawość (All the Brightness), work on the novel having begun three years earlier in the form of notes in Stachura's journal. The second novel, Siekierezada albo zima leśnych ludzi (Axing, or the Winter of the Forest Folk), followed in 1971, and it earned the author Stanisław Piętak Prize for the second time. Like the first novel, the book began with notes in the journal starting in 1967, and it was written partly in Mexico where Stachura studied in 1969 and 1970 on a twelve-month scholarship funded by the Mexican government.

The period during the writing and directly after the completion of the second novel was particularly difficult for Stachura. His marriage disintegrated, throwing him into fits of depression during which he contemplated suicide. After his return from Mexico, Stachura traveled much around Poland, often drinking heavily. In 1971, he visited the Middle East: Damascus and Beirut, and he returned to Poland via Rome and Prague. In January 1972, Stachura lost his "adopted father," Rafał Urban: a writer and a storyteller; a fascinating, colorful character, twice his age, who died of cancer. In September, Stachura's marriage was legally dissolved, and two months later his natural father died, also of cancer. Stanisław Stachura was a formidable character who over the years inspired in his son a wide range of emotions: admiration, fear, hostility, and—eventually—pity. Right after his father's funeral, Stachura found himself in a hospital, a victim of an abnormally strong allergic reaction; while there, he wrote letters to all three siblings informing them of his intent to break off all contact with them—the symptom of a tendency that would soon become more pronounced.

=== The final years ===
In 1973 Stachura travelled to Norway, then to Geneva to receive The Kościelski Prize, and from there to France, to visit his birthplace in Charvieu. Next year he spent a few months in the United States, Canada, and Mexico. In 1975 Stachura published Wszystko jest poezja (Everything is Poetry)—a collection of essays blending impressionistic commentary about everyday events in the author's life with philosophical reflections on the nature of the creative process and the relationship between life and literature. The book was followed by the publication of a long poem, "Kropka nad ypsylonem" ("A Dot over Ypsilon") in the literary monthly Twórczość.

In the next few years Stachura showed a gradual deepening of distancing himself from events and people, and of his perception of aversion and hostility in the actions of friends and relatives. This transformation ultimately led to what is described by some as the mystical period in his life and writing, and by others as evidence of progressive mental illness. In 1977 he published Się—a collection of short stories employing a peculiar narrative technique (the title is a reflexive pronoun central to that technique), and suggesting, in the last selection, the elimination of corporeality. The book met with mixed reception. In 1978 Stachura published his last volume of poetry, Missa pagana. The next book, Fabula rasa, was to be his last. Published in 1979, the work continued the direction suggested two years earlier by Się—Stachura even insisted (unsuccessfully) on his name on the cover being replaced with the phrase "No-man." The book led to extremely polarized critical reactions: they ranged from calling it a manifestation of the author's mental breakdown (Ziemowit Fedecki) to praising it as one of the greatest works in the world literature (Andrzej Falkiewicz).

Regardless of the assessment of Stachura's final work, there is no doubt that he was afflicted during that time with mental disturbances. In April 1979 he suffered a mysterious train accident: he refused to step away from the railroad track along which he was walking, despite the fact that he saw an approaching train. He suffered concussion and lost most of his right hand. After a period of hospitalization in a psychiatric ward (which he requested), Stachura returned to his mother in Aleksandrów Kujawski. He taught himself to write with his left hand and described his experiences before, during, and after the accident in a deeply moving journal, later published under the title "Pogodzić się ze światem" ("To Come to Terms with the World"). He continued writing in the journal until just four days before his death. Stachura took his own life by hanging in his Warsaw apartment on 24 July 1979, leaving behind his final poem: "List do pozostałych" ("A Letter to the Remaining")

The poetry and life of Edward Stachura are central to the story of a Quebec man translating Stachura's poetry into French, in the 2012 Canadian feature film "Tout ce que tu possèdes" ("All that you possess"), by Bernard Émond. https://www.imdb.com/title/tt2458596/. The screenplay, which includes some of Stachura's poems, is published by Lux Éditeur. https://web.archive.org/web/20160304080154/http://www.luxediteur.com/content/tout-ce-que-tu-poss%C3%A8des. ISBN 978-2-89596-139-0.

== A listing of works ==
=== Poetry ===
- Dużo ognia (Lots of Fire) (1963)
- Przystępuję do ciebie (I Come Close to You ) (1968)
- Po ogrodzie niech hula szarańcza (Let the Locust Hold Sway in the Garden) (1968)
- Kropka nad ypsilonem (A Dot over Ypsilon) (1975)
- Missa pagana (1978)

=== Collections of Short Stories ===
- Jeden dzień (One Day) (1962)
- Falując na wietrze (Waving in the Wind) (1966)
- Się (1977)

=== Novels ===
- Cała jaskrawość (All the Brightness) (1969)
- Siekierezada albo zima leśnych ludzi (Axing, or the Winter of the Forest Folk) (1971)

=== Other prose ===
- Wszystko jest poezja: Opowieść-rzeka (Everything is Poetry: A River-Tale) (1975)
- Fabula rasa (rzecz o egoizmie) (Fabula Rasa (A Piece on Egoism)) (1979)
- Fabula rasa (apendyks) (Fabula Rasa (Appendix)) (1979)
- Oto (Here) (1979)

=== Collected works ===
- Poezja i proza (Poetry and Prose) (1982)
  - Vol. 1 Wiersze, poematy, piosenki, przeklady (Poetry, Songs, Translations)
  - Vol. 2 Opowiadania (Short Stories)
  - Vol. 3 Powieści (Novels)
  - Vol. 4 Wszystko jest poezja (Everything is Poetry)
  - Vol. 5 Fabula rasa. Z wypowiedzi rosproszonych (Fabula Rasa. From Scattered Utterances)
