= Kłosiński =

Kłosiński is a Polish language habitational surname for someone from Kłuśno. Notable people with the name include:

- Edward Kłosiński (1943–2008), Polish cinematographer
- Janusz Kłosiński (1920–2017), Polish film and theatre actor
- Sebastian Kłosiński (1992), Polish speed skater
