= Ośno Drugie =

- Village
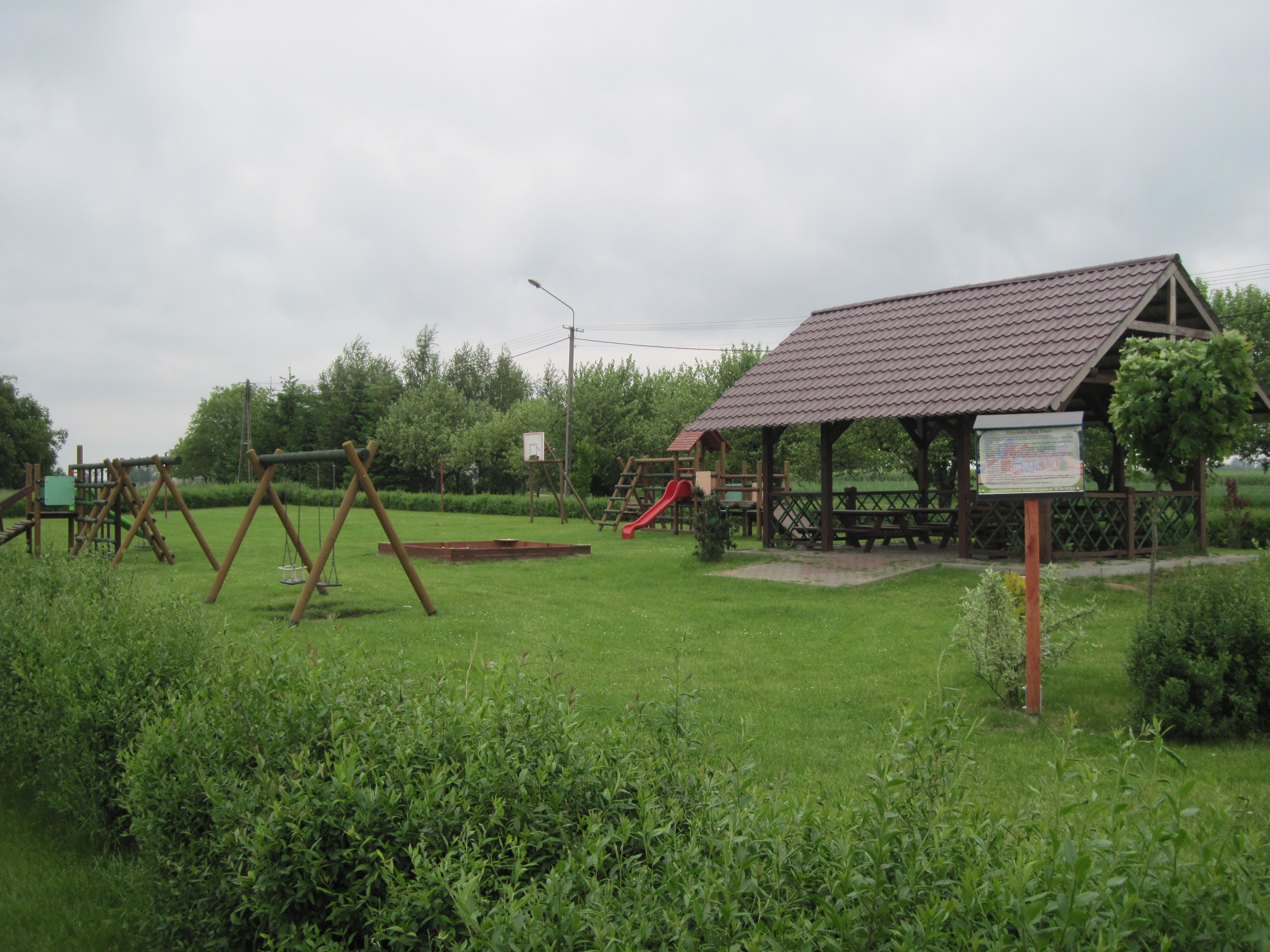
- Playground in Ośno Drugie

- Location within Poland
- Coordinates: 52°50′49″N 18°42′13″E
- Country: Poland
- Voivodeship: Kuyavian-Pomeranian
- County: Aleksandrów
- Gmina: Aleksandrów Kujawski
- Population: 208

Ośno Drugie [ˈɔɕnɔ druɡiɛ] is a village in the administrative district of Gmina Aleksandrów Kujawski, within Aleksandrów County, Kuyavian-Pomeranian Voivodeship, in north-central Poland.
