= Gedko II =

Polish bishop (died 1296)

Gedko II was a Bishop of Płock, Poland from 1294 until his death in 1296 AD. He is also known as Gosław.

Little is known of his life, career or short episcopacy, that lasted from 1294 to 1296 AD. According to Jan Długosz Gedko participated in the coronation of Przemysł II in Gniezno in 1295.

Religious titles
Preceded by Tomasz Tomka	Bishop of Płock; 1294-1296	Succeeded by Jan Wysoki of Prawdzic
