= Słońsk Dolny =

- Village
- Location within Poland
- Coordinates: 52°54′N 18°46′E
- Country: Poland
- Voivodeship: Kuyavian-Pomeranian
- County: Aleksandrów
- Gmina: Aleksandrów Kujawski
- Population: 222

Słońsk Dolny [ˈswɔɲsk ˈdɔlnɨ] is a village in the administrative district of Gmina Aleksandrów Kujawski, within Aleksandrów County, Kuyavian-Pomeranian Voivodeship, in north-central Poland.
