= Nowe Zasady =

- Village
- Location within Poland
- Coordinates: 53°06′03″N 19°34′05″E
- Country: Poland
- Voivodeship: Kuyavian-Pomeranian
- County: Brodnica
- Gmina: Świedziebnia

Nowe Zasady [ˈnɔvɛ zaˈsadɨ] is a village in the administrative district of Gmina Świedziebnia, within Brodnica County, Kuyavian-Pomeranian Voivodeship, in north-central Poland.
