= Opoczki =

- Village
- Location within Poland
- Coordinates: 52°51′N 18°33′E
- Country: Poland
- Voivodeship: Kuyavian-Pomeranian
- County: Aleksandrów
- Gmina: Aleksandrów Kujawski
- Population: 162
- Time zone: UTC+1 (CET)
  - Summer (DST): UTC+2 (CEST)
- Vehicle registration: CAL

Opoczki [ɔˈpɔt͡ʂkʲi] is a village in the administrative district of Gmina Aleksandrów Kujawski, within Aleksandrów County, Kuyavian-Pomeranian Voivodeship, in north-central Poland. It is located in the region of Kuyavia.

== History ==
During World War II, Opoczki was occupied by Germany. The Germans renamed it to Kleinottingen in attempt to erase traces of Polish origin. In 1939–1940, they carried out expulsions of Poles, whose farms were then handed over to Germans as part of the Lebensraum policy. Expelled Poles were either deported to the General Government in the more eastern part of German-occupied Poland or enslaved as forced labour of German colonists in the area.
