= Rudunki, Kuyavian-Pomeranian Voivodeship =

Rudunki
- Village
- Location within Poland
- Coordinates: 52°51′36″N 18°39′14″E
- Country: Poland
- Voivodeship: Kuyavian-Pomeranian
- County: Aleksandrów
- Gmina: Aleksandrów Kujawski
- Population: 253

Rudunki [ruˈduŋkʲi] is a village in the administrative district of Gmina Aleksandrów Kujawski, within Aleksandrów County, Kuyavian-Pomeranian Voivodeship, in north-central Poland.
