= Augustinus Rotundus =

Polish humanist, jurist, political writer and historian (1520–1582)

Augustinus Rotundus (Polish: Augustyn Rotundus, Lithuanian: Augustinas Rotundas, 1520–1582) was a Polish-born Christian and Renaissance humanist, erudite, jurist, political writer, and the first historian and apologist of Lithuania. Rotundus was vogt of Vilnius, general secretary to the Grand Duke and King Sigismund Augustus and elder of Stakliškės. After his nobilitation to the szlachta (nobility), Rotundus adopted surname Mieleski, or Milewski.

== Biography ==
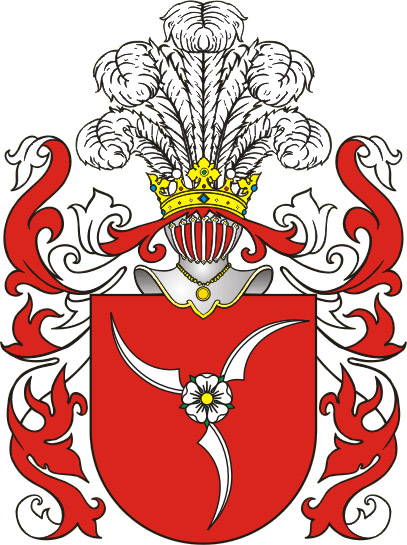
Rola coat of arms

Church of Saint John's - the Baptist and Evangelist

Rotundus was born in Wieluń in the Kingdom of Poland around year 1520. His surname is supposed to be "Mieleski", although some researchers suggest that it was adopted later. Rotundus is translated nickname, probably inherited from his father – Mikołaj (English: Nickolas) "Okrągły" (Latin: Rotundus), who was a rich furrier in the city of Wieluń.

Rotundus studied in University of Wittenberg and Lubrański Academy in Poznań, where he was suspected of writing a nasty lampoon about Poznań catholic chapter. Undoubtedly Rotundus was a passionate catholic after graduation and supported Hereditary monarchy and Execution movement.

He arrived in Vilnius, capital of the Grand Duchy of Lithuania on 20 August 1551. He was invited by Grand Duke of Lithuania Sigismund Augustus as a legal advisor, and one who knew both Grand Duchy and Crown's law. Assigned as vogt of Vilnius in 1552 (most probably suggested by city inhabitants), he became loyal citizen of Lithuania, and wrote several works on Lithuania's history and political polemic works defending Lithuania's rights. In 1558 he was appointed as elder of Stakliškės.

He was married to Sofia Montanówna, Italian by origin (she died after 10 March 1604). They had a son, Nickolas, who died in his infancy and two daughters: Regina and Elizabeth. For his work and achievements Rotundus was ennobled in 1568 by Sejm held in Grodno. He was awarded Rola coat of arms.

Augustinus Rotundus died on 20 March 1582 and was buried in the church of Saint John's - the Baptist and Evangelist, in Vilnius.

== Ideas and works ==
Rotundus supported Lithuanian statehood against claims of the Polish Crown. He was progenitor of mythical deductions and his passion were noble families. Rotundus contributed to the second and the third Statutes of Lithuania. He collaborated on these acts together with Peter Roisius, Ostafi Wołłowicz and Mikołaj "the Black" Radziwiłł. He personally translated the Second Statute into Latin and added his own study Epitome principum Lituaniae (Lithuanian Dukes Epitome) as a foreword. In this study Rotundus promoted the idea, that Lithuanians together with their Dukes have roots in the ancient Roman Empire, from the mythical house of Palemonids. Similar theories were raised by Jan Długosz, but both were lacking evidences to support this theory.

Rotundus was probably contributing to the second edition of the Lithuanian Chronicles. He claimed that Publius Libonus, Roman commander who fled from Julius Caesar and supposedly settled down in Lithuania, was ancestor of Lithuanian and Ruthenian rulers. Supposedly the name of Livonia comes from Libonus. In his opinion, this explained why Latin language was common in the Polish–Lithuanian Commonwealth and also served to support sarmatism ideals. Rotundus was a close friend to other Vilnius renaissance scholars like physician Jan Antonin (Latin: Joannes Antoninus) and a poet Klemens Janicki (Latin: Clemens Ianicius), after the latter died, both published Ianicius artworks.

In 1564 on personal request by Mikołaj "the Black" Radziwiłł Rotundus wrote Rozmowy Polaka z Litwinem (Conversations of Pole with Lithuanian) – a polemic work, where he defended Lithuania's dignity against insults by Polish author Stanisław Orzechowski in Quincunx (1554), "...against disgraceful and mistaken Stanisławs Orzechowski writing, which innocent famous Lithuanian Duchy insulted...". Although it is recognized as Rotundus personal work, after thorough analysis of the work Lithuanian historian Ingė Lukšaitė suggested that it was a collective work by several authors.

== Bibliography ==
- Rozmowa Polaka z Litwinem 1564 (Conversation of a Pole with a Lithuanian)
- Epitome principum Lituaniae 1566 (Lithuanian Dukes Epitome)
- De dignitate ordinis ecclesiastici Regni Poloniae Kraków 1582
