= Brodniczka, Kuyavian-Pomeranian Voivodeship =

Brodniczka
- Village
- Location within Poland
- Coordinates: 53°8′36″N 19°37′19″E
- Country: Poland
- Voivodeship: Kuyavian-Pomeranian
- County: Brodnica
- Gmina: Świedziebnia
- Population: 110

Brodniczka [brɔdˈnit͡ʂka] is a village in the administrative district of Gmina Świedziebnia, within Brodnica County, Kuyavian-Pomeranian Voivodeship, in north-central Poland.
