= Jan Tarnowski (1550–1605) =

Polish archbishop and noble

His Excellency Jan Tarnowski
- Archbishop of Gniezno; Primate of Poland
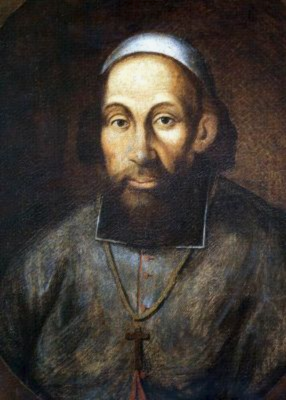
- Diocese: Roman Catholic Archdiocese of Gniezno
- See: Archdiocese of Gniezno

Personal details
- Born: 1550 Karnkowo
- Died: 1605 (aged 54–55)
- Denomination: Roman Catholic

Jan Tarnowski (c. 1550 – 14 September 1605 in Łowicz, Poland) was Archbishop of Gniezno and Primate of Poland. His coat of arms was Rola.

Jan was secretary of King Stefan Batory of Poland and a trusted adviser of King Sigismund III Vasa of Poland. In 1581 he became Referendarz of the Crown and in 1591 Deputy Chancellor of the Crown. He became also bishop of Poznań in 1598, bishop of Kujawy in 1600 and in 1604 Archbishop of Kraków and simultaneously Primate of Poland.

Preceded by Łukasz Kościelski	Bishop of Poznań; 1598–1600	Succeeded by Wawrzyniec Goślicki
Preceded by Stanisław Karnkowski	Primate of Poland; Archbishop of Gniezno; 1604–1605	Succeeded by Bernard Maciejowski
