= Józef Niemojewski =

Polish general (1769–1839)

Józef Niemojewski (of Rola coat of arms) (born July 4, 1769, in Śrem – died July 16, 1839, in Rokitnica) was a brigadier general of the Duchy of Warsaw, major general of the Polish insurrectionist forces in Wielkopolska during the Greater Poland Uprising (1794) and the Kościuszko Uprising, brigadier general in the Grande Armée of Napoleon Bonaparte and elected starosta of Śrem eldership.

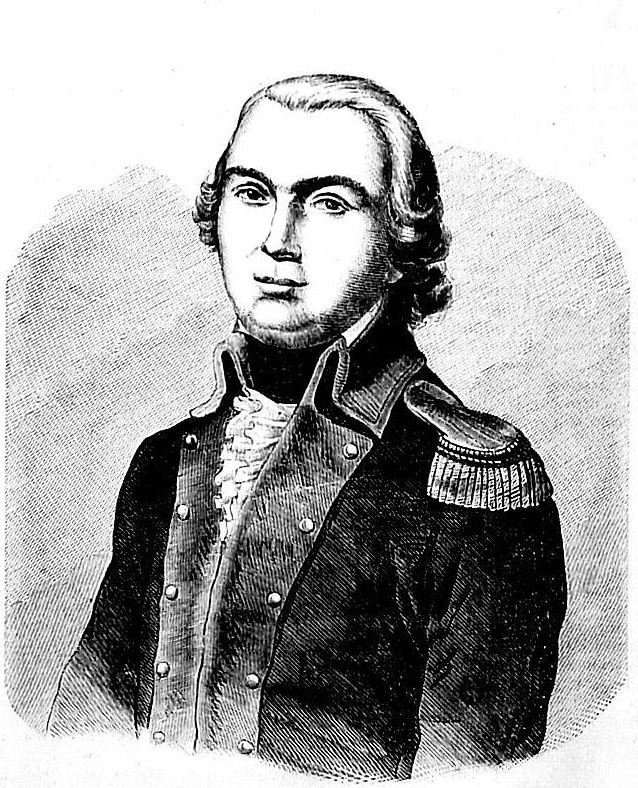
Józef Niemojewski
