= Wołuszewo =

- Village
- Location within Poland
- Coordinates: 52°54′N 18°45′E
- Country: Poland
- Voivodeship: Kuyavian-Pomeranian
- County: Aleksandrów
- Gmina: Aleksandrów Kujawski
- Population: 707
- Time zone: UTC+1 (CET)
  - Summer (DST): UTC+2 (CEST)
- Vehicle registration: CAL

Wołuszewo [vɔwuˈʂɛvɔ] is a village in the administrative district of Gmina Aleksandrów Kujawski, within Aleksandrów County, Kuyavian-Pomeranian Voivodeship, in north-central Poland. It is located in the historic region of Kuyavia.

== History ==
Wołuszewo was mentioned in documents in 1583. It had a population of 340 in 1827

During the German occupation of Poland (World War II), in October 1939–January 1940, the Germans murdered many Poles from the village in the nearby Odolion forest, and at about the same time they expelled hundreds of Poles, who were either deported to the General Government or held as forced labour, while their farms were handed over to Germans as part of the Lebensraum policy (see Nazi crimes against the Polish nation).

== Transport ==
The Polish north-south A1 motorway runs nearby, west of the village.

== Cuisine ==
The officially protected traditional food originating from Wołuszewo is local butter (Masło wiejskie z Wołuszewa), as designated by the Ministry of Agriculture and Rural Development of Poland.
