= Pinino, Aleksandrów County =

Pinino
- Village
- Location within Poland
- Coordinates: 52°49′N 18°37′E
- Country: Poland
- Voivodeship: Kuyavian-Pomeranian
- County: Aleksandrów
- Gmina: Aleksandrów Kujawski
- Population: 26

Pinino [pʲiˈɲinɔ] is a village in the administrative district of Gmina Aleksandrów Kujawski, within Aleksandrów County, Kuyavian-Pomeranian Voivodeship, in north-central Poland.
