= Ośno, Aleksandrów County =

Ośno
- Village
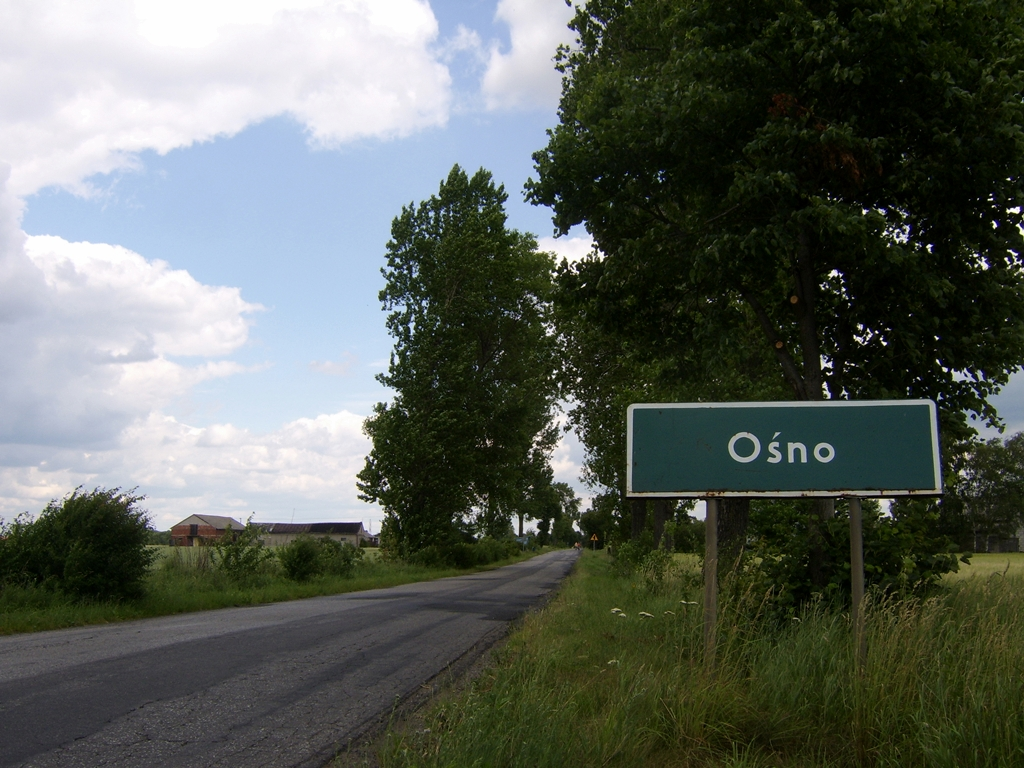

- Location within Poland
- Coordinates: 52°51′12″N 18°43′32″E
- Country: Poland
- Voivodeship: Kuyavian-Pomeranian
- County: Aleksandrów
- Gmina: Aleksandrów Kujawski
- Population: 375
- Time zone: UTC+1 (CET)
  - Summer (DST): UTC+2 (CEST)
- Vehicle registration: CAL

Ośno [ˈɔɕnɔ] is a village in the administrative district of Gmina Aleksandrów Kujawski, within Aleksandrów County, Kuyavian-Pomeranian Voivodeship, in north-central Poland. It is located in the region of Kuyavia.

== History ==
In 1827, the village had a population of 225.

During the German occupation of Poland (World War II), in 1939–1940, the occupiers carried out expulsions of Poles, whose farms were then handed over to Germans as part of the Lebensraum policy.

Expelled Poles were either deported to the General Government in the more eastern part of German-occupied Poland or enslaved as forced labour of German colonists in the area.

== Notable people ==
- Michał Hieronim Leszczyc-Sumiński (1820–1898), Polish botanist, painter and art collector was born here.
