= Gmina Świedziebnia =

Gmina Świedziebnia Świedziebnia Commune
- Gmina
- Interactive map of Gmina Świedziebnia
- Coordinates (Świedziebnia): 53°9′N 19°33′E
- Country: Poland
- Voivodeship: Kuyavian-Pomeranian
- County: Brodnica
- Seat: Świedziebnia

Area
  - Total: 103.83 km^{2} (40.09 sq mi)

Population (2011)
  - Total: 5,209
  - Density: 50.17/km^{2} (129.9/sq mi)

Gmina Świedziebnia is a rural gmina (administrative district) in Brodnica County, Kuyavian-Pomeranian Voivodeship, in north-central Poland. Its seat is the village of Świedziebnia, which lies approximately 15 kilometres (9 mi) south-east of Brodnica and 64 km (40 mi) east of Toruń.

The gmina covers an area of 103.83 square kilometres (40.1 sq mi), and as of 2006 its total population is 5,116 (5,209 in 2011).

The gmina contains part of the protected area called Górzno-Lidzbark Landscape Park.

== Villages ==
Gmina Świedziebnia contains the villages and settlements of Brodniczka, Chlebowo, Dzierzno, Granaty, Grzęby, Janowo, Kłuśno, Księte, Mełno, Michałki, Niemojewo, Nowa Rokitnica, Nowe Zasady, Okalewko, Ostrów, Rokitnica-Wieś, Stare Zasady, Świedziebnia, Zasadki and Zduny.

== Neighbouring gminas ==
Gmina Świedziebnia is bordered by the gminas of Bartniczka, Brodnica, Górzno, Lubowidz, Osiek, Rypin and Skrwilno.
