= Rola coat of arms =

Polish coat of arms

Rola
- Alternative names: Rolanin, Rolic, lat. Agricola
- Earliest mention: 1330 (seal of Nasięgniew from Świątkowice)
- Families: Arciszewski, Arestowicz, Bartochowski, Bartnikowski, Białaczowski, Boczkowski, Bolkowski, Borucki, Chorkowski, Chrapicki, Chrościcki, Chrzanowski, Danielewicz, Dobrogost, Drwalewski, Drwalowski, Dworzański, Dzierżawski, Erciszewski, Gadomski, Gajewski, Gawroński, Głosowski, Gogoliński, Gogołkiewicz, Golski, Gosłowski, Gromadziński, Gminski, Guminski, Gumowski, Janicki, Januszowski, Jarochowski, Jaruchowski, Kłosowski, Kobylnicki, Kochański, Komorowski, Konarski, Kopeć, Kozielski, Krzęciewski, Kucharski, Kuligowski, Lubieniecki, Lubieniek, Lubliński, Ławecki, Łubnicki, Magnuszewski, Mąka, Mielnicki, Mieński, Modrzewski, Niegibulski, Niemojewski, Ossowski, Owsiany, Piekarski, Pleszczyński, Pniewski, Podczaski, Pucek, Rakowiecki, Rogawski, Rogilski, Rola, Rolski, Różycki, Rusieński, Rzeszewski, Sadkowski, Satkowski, Skibicki, Skorwid, Skotnicki, Skrzetuski, Slubicki, Słubicki, Soćko, Stanisławski, Stęsicki, Stężycki, Sujkowski, Stypułkowski, Szadkowski, Szatkowski, Szczyciński, Ścisieński, Ślubicki, Świętosławski, Tarnowski, Wargawski, Wawrzecki, Wioteski, Witowski, Wituński, Wolski, Wolyniec, Wyścielski, Zalewski, Załuskowski, Zbijewski. Zdrojkowski

Rola is a Polish coat of arms. It was used by several szlachta families in the times of the Kingdom of Poland and Polish–Lithuanian Commonwealth.

One of the several Polish coats of arms which adopted Lithuanian catholic nobles due to Union of Horodło (1413) acts.

== Blazon ==
Gules, a rose Argent seeded Or, encircled by three coulters Argent, one pointed downwards.

== Notable bearers ==
Notable bearers of this coat of arms include:

- Jan Januszowski
- Piotr Wolyniec
- Balthasar "Balthus" Klossowski
- Pierre Klossowski
- Stanisław Kostka Gadomski
- Stanisław Lubieniecki
- Józef Niemojewski
- Stanisław Rola-Arciszewski
- Augustinus Rotundus
- Aleksander Rożniecki
- Jan Tarnowski
- Tomasz Wawrzecki

== Gallery ==
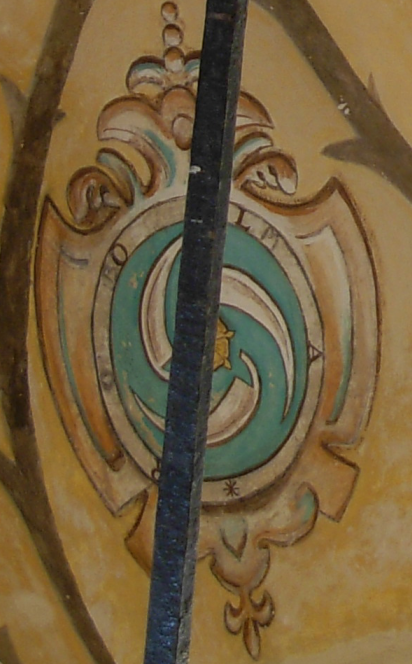
fresco in Baranów Sandomierski Castle

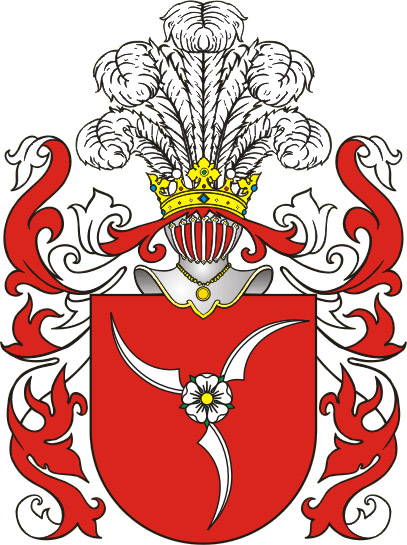
Rola

Kroje (variant)

Borek III (variant)

Kątny (variant)

Proboszczowski (variant)

Sieroszewski (variant)

Wierzejewski (variant)

== See also ==
- Polish heraldry
- Heraldic family
- List of Polish nobility coats of arms
- triskelion

== Bibliography ==
- Długosz, Jan. Insignia seu clenodia Regis et Regni Poloniae.
- Jean Le Fevre de Saint-Remy (15th century). Armorial Toison d'Or. fol. 119v
- Paprocki, Bartosz (1584). Herby Rycerztwa Polskiego. Kraków. pp. 260–262.
- Okolski, Szymon (1643). Orbis Poloni. Vol. 2. Kraków. pp. 624–632.
- Górzyński, Sławomir; Kochanowski, Jerzy (1990). Herby szlachty polskiej. Warsaw: Wydawnictwa Uniwersytetu Warszawskiego i Wydawnictwa "Alfa". p. 138. ISBN 83-230-0349-1.
- Szymański, Józef (1993). Herbarz średniowiecznego rycerstwa polskiego. Warsaw: Wydawnictwo Naukowe PWN. pp. 254–255. ISBN 83-01-09797-3.
- Gajl, Tadeusz (2007). Herbarz polski od średniowiecza do XX wieku: ponad 4500 herbów szlacheckich 37 tysięcy nazwisk 55 tysięcy rodów. L&L. pp. 406–539. ISBN 978-83-60597-10-1.
