= Poczałkowo =

- Village
- Location within Poland
- Coordinates: 52°49′19″N 18°38′20″E
- Country: Poland
- Voivodeship: Kuyavian-Pomeranian
- County: Aleksandrów
- Gmina: Aleksandrów Kujawski
- Population: 104

Poczałkowo [pɔt͡ʂau̯ˈkɔvɔ] is a village in the administrative district of Gmina Aleksandrów Kujawski, within Aleksandrów County, Kuyavian-Pomeranian Voivodeship, in north-central Poland.
