= Grzęby =

- Village
- Location within Poland
- Coordinates: 53°7′N 19°31′E
- Country: Poland
- Voivodeship: Kuyavian-Pomeranian
- County: Brodnica
- Gmina: Świedziebnia

Grzęby [ˈɡʐɛmbɨ] is a village in the administrative district of Gmina Świedziebnia, within Brodnica County, Kuyavian-Pomeranian Voivodeship, in north-central Poland.
