= Białe Błota, Aleksandrów County =

Białe Błota
- Village
- Location within Poland
- Coordinates: 52°53′38″N 18°42′21″E
- Country: Poland
- Voivodeship: Kuyavian-Pomeranian
- County: Aleksandrów
- Gmina: Aleksandrów Kujawski
- Population: 90

Białe Błota [ˈbʲawɛ ˈbwɔta] is a village in the administrative district of Gmina Aleksandrów Kujawski, within Aleksandrów County, Kuyavian-Pomeranian Voivodeship, in north-central Poland.
