= Gmina Aleksandrów Kujawski =

Gmina Aleksandrów Kujawski Aleksandrów Kujawski Commune
- Gmina
- Coat of arms

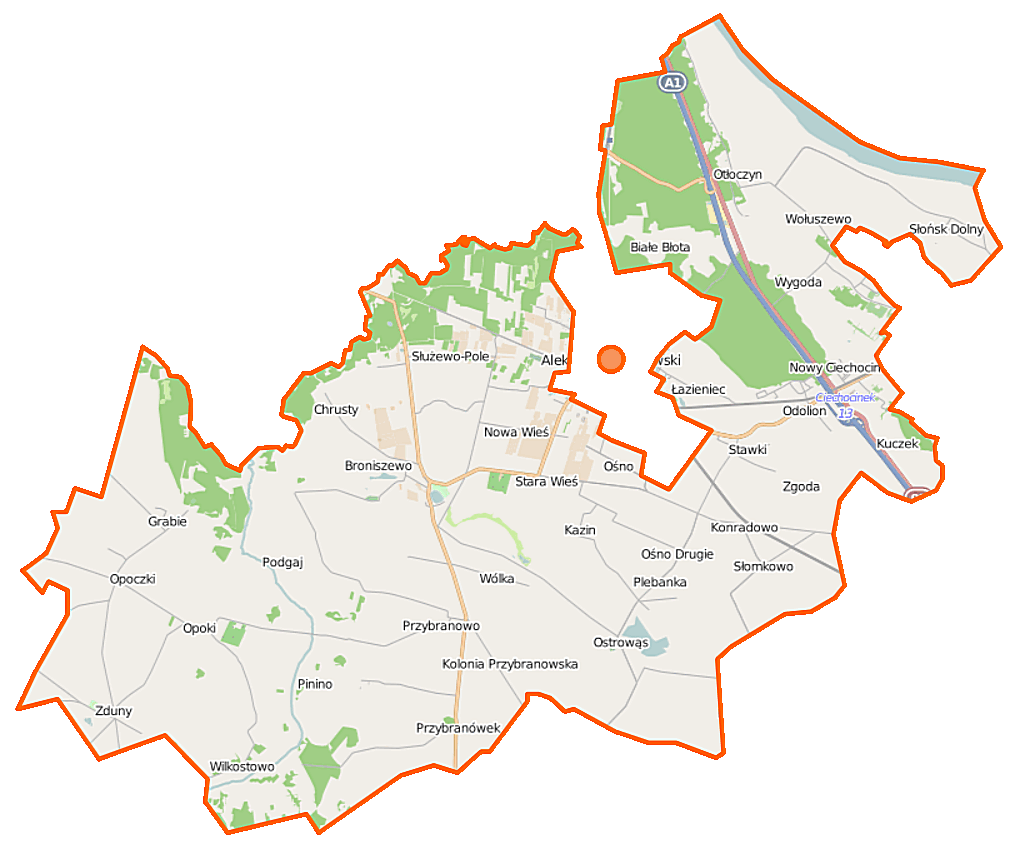
- Map of Aleksandrów Kujawski gmina and its localities
- Coordinates (Aleksandrów Kujawski): 52°52′N 18°42′E
- Country: Poland
- Voivodeship: Kuyavian-Pomeranian
- County: Aleksandrów
- Seat: Aleksandrów Kujawski

Area
  - Total: 131.64 km^{2} (50.83 sq mi)

Population (2006)
  - Total: 10,874
  - Density: 82.604/km^{2} (213.94/sq mi)
- Website: http://www.gmina-aleksandrowkujawski.pl/

Gmina Aleksandrów Kujawski is a rural gmina (administrative district) in Aleksandrów County, Kuyavian-Pomeranian Voivodeship, in north-central Poland. Its seat is the town of Aleksandrów Kujawski, although the town is not part of the territory of the gmina.

The gmina covers an area of 131.64 square kilometres (50.8 sq mi), and as of 2006 its total population is 10,874.

== Villages ==
Gmina Aleksandrów Kujawski contains the villages of Białe Błota, Chrusty, Goszczewo, Grabie, Konradowo, Kuczek, Łazieniec, Nowa Wieś, Nowy Ciechocinek, Odolion, Opoczki, Opoki, Ośno, Ośno-Parcele, Ostrowąs, Otłoczyn, Otłoczynek, Pinino, Plebanka, Poczałkowo, Poczałkowo-Kolonia, Podgaj, Przybranówek, Przybranowo, Rudunki, Słomkowo, Słońsk Dolny, Służewo, Stara Wieś, Stare Rożno, Stawki, Wilkostowo, Wólka, Wołuszewo, Wygoda, Zduny and Zgoda.

== Neighbouring gminas ==
Gmina Aleksandrów Kujawski is bordered by the towns of Aleksandrów Kujawski and Ciechocinek, and by the gminas of Dąbrowa Biskupia, Gniewkowo, Koneck, Obrowo, Raciążek and Wielka Nieszawka.
