= Wygoda, Aleksandrów County =

Wygoda
- Village
- Location within Poland
- Coordinates: 52°53′25″N 18°44′38″E
- Country: Poland
- Voivodeship: Kuyavian-Pomeranian
- County: Aleksandrów
- Gmina: Aleksandrów Kujawski
- Population: 61

Wygoda [vɨˈɡɔda] is a village in the administrative district of Gmina Aleksandrów Kujawski, within Aleksandrów County, Kuyavian-Pomeranian Voivodeship, in north-central Poland.
