= Odolion =

- Village
- Location within Poland
- Coordinates: 52°52′N 18°45′E
- Country: Poland
- Voivodeship: Kuyavian-Pomeranian
- County: Aleksandrów
- Gmina: Aleksandrów Kujawski
- Population: 740
- Time zone: UTC+1 (CET)
  - Summer (DST): UTC+2 (CEST)
- Vehicle registration: CAL

Odolion [ɔˈdɔlʲɔn] is a village in the administrative district of Gmina Aleksandrów Kujawski, within Aleksandrów County, Kuyavian-Pomeranian Voivodeship, in north-central Poland.

== History and development ==
Odolion is located 3 km away from the famous Polish spa town of Ciechocinek and 5 km from Aleksandrów Kujawski, an important national railway interchange. A railway runs directly between these two towns, stopping only at Odolion in between. The main purpose of the railway line was to take visitors from all parts of the country to Ciechocinek, a small principality, via Aleksandrów Kujawski. It is however a major means of transport for the people of Odolion, taking them to school, work, and for leisure.

During the German occupation of Poland (World War II), the German police massacred 266 Poles from Aleksandrów Kujawski, Ciechocinek and Wołuszewo in the Odolion forest throughout October 1939–January 1940 (see Nazi crimes against the Polish nation).

The village began to be built up in the 1970s and is now growing rapidly. In the early 1990s, the parish of Odolion-Stawki was created - before, the villagers had to travel either to Aleksandrów or Ciechocinek to go to church and belonged to these respective parishes. A chapel was built in Miła street, and a large, modern church was completed in 2006, adjacent to the chapel to cope with the increasing population. There is a cemetery just outside the village, in the Stawki area.
