= Opoki, Poland =

Opoki
- Village
- Location within Poland
- Coordinates: 52°50′N 18°35′E
- Country: Poland
- Voivodeship: Kuyavian-Pomeranian
- County: Aleksandrów
- Gmina: Aleksandrów Kujawski
- Population: 277
- Time zone: UTC+1 (CET)
  - Summer (DST): UTC+2 (CEST)
- Vehicle registration: CAL

Opoki [ɔˈpɔkʲi] is a village in the administrative district of Gmina Aleksandrów Kujawski, within Aleksandrów County, Kuyavian-Pomeranian Voivodeship, in north-central Poland. It is located in the region of Kuyavia.

== History ==
In 1292, Władysław I Łokietek allowed Bishop Tomasz Tomka to build a castle in Opoki. In 1454, Opoki was the place of gathering of the Polish Army at the beginning of the Thirteen Years' War and King Casimir IV Jagiellon stayed there for over two weeks. In the late 19th century, the village had a population of 318, predominantly Catholic by confession.

During World War II, Opoki was occupied by Germany. The Germans renamed it to Groß Ottingen in attempt to erase traces of Polish origin. In 1939–1940, they carried out expulsions of Poles, whose farms were then handed over to Germans as part of the Lebensraum policy. Expelled Poles were either deported to the General Government in the more eastern part of German-occupied Poland or enslaved as forced labour of German colonists in the area.
