= Mełno, Brodnica County =

Mełno
- Village
- Location within Poland
- Coordinates: 53°09′29″N 19°36′24″E
- Country: Poland
- Voivodeship: Kuyavian-Pomeranian
- County: Brodnica
- Gmina: Świedziebnia

Mełno [ˈmɛu̯nɔ] is a village in the administrative district of Gmina Świedziebnia, within Brodnica County, Kuyavian-Pomeranian Voivodeship, in north-central Poland.
