= Kuczek =

- Village
- Location within Poland
- Coordinates: 52°51′48″N 18°46′20″E
- Country: Poland
- Voivodeship: Kuyavian-Pomeranian
- County: Aleksandrów
- Gmina: Aleksandrów Kujawski

Kuczek [ˈkut͡ʂɛk] is a village in the administrative district of Gmina Aleksandrów Kujawski, within Aleksandrów County, Kuyavian-Pomeranian Voivodeship, in north-central Poland.
