= Stanisław Kostka Gadomski =

Polish-Lithuanian general

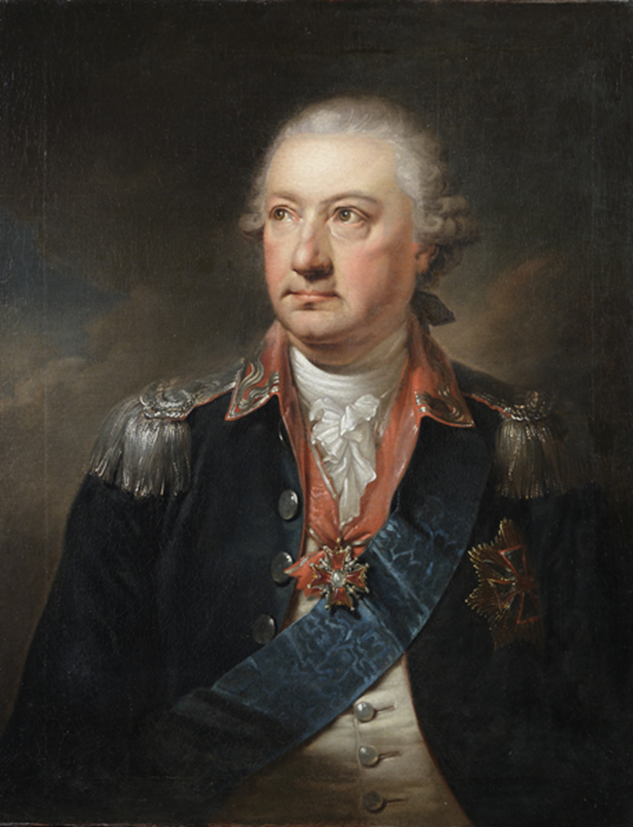
Stanisław Kostka Gadomski

Stanisław Kostka Gadomski de Rola (1718–1797) was a Polish nobleman and governor of the Łęczyca Province of Poland since 1787. He was also the Speaker of the Sejm, General officer of the Armed Forces in the Polish–Lithuanian Commonwealth and Starost of Krystynopol.

He accompanied the exiled Stanisław Leszczyński (Stanislaus I) to Lorraine in France, where he completed military training in the Knights' Academy at Nancy. During the War of the Austrian Succession, he served in the French army. Moreover, he took part in the Silesian Wars amongst ranks of the Prussian army. After he had returned to Poland he became a supporter of the Potocki family. In 1747, Stanisław Gadomski became an adjutant of Grand Crown Hetman Józef Potocki. Between 1752 and 1754 he received a yearly salary from the French ambassador equivalent to the amount of 400 ducats. In 1757, he was nominated as a general-major of the Crown Army. In 1760, he became an army deputy in fiscal tribunal.

Gadomski was designated as a member of the General Sejm in 1760, the Convocation Sejm in 1764, the Czaplic Sejm in 1766 and the Repnin Sejm in 1767. He supported the election of Stanisław August Poniatowski to the Polish throne. In 1766, he was decorated with the Order of Saint Stanislaus and the Order of the White Eagle in later years.
