= Janowo, Brodnica County =

Janowo
- Village
- Location within Poland
- Coordinates: 53°9′N 19°35′E
- Country: Poland
- Voivodeship: Kuyavian-Pomeranian
- County: Brodnica
- Gmina: Świedziebnia
- Population: 750

Janowo [jaˈnɔvɔ] is a village in the administrative district of Gmina Świedziebnia, within Brodnica County, Kuyavian-Pomeranian Voivodeship, in north-central Poland.
