= Stawki, Kuyavian-Pomeranian Voivodeship =

Stawki
- Village
- Location within Poland
- Coordinates: 52°51′46″N 18°43′39″E
- Country: Poland
- Voivodeship: Kuyavian-Pomeranian
- County: Aleksandrów
- Gmina: Aleksandrów Kujawski
- Population: 579

Stawki [ˈstafkʲi] is a village in the administrative district of Gmina Aleksandrów Kujawski, within Aleksandrów County, Kuyavian-Pomeranian Voivodeship, in north-central Poland.
