= Goszczewo, Kuyavian-Pomeranian Voivodeship =

Goszczewo
- Village
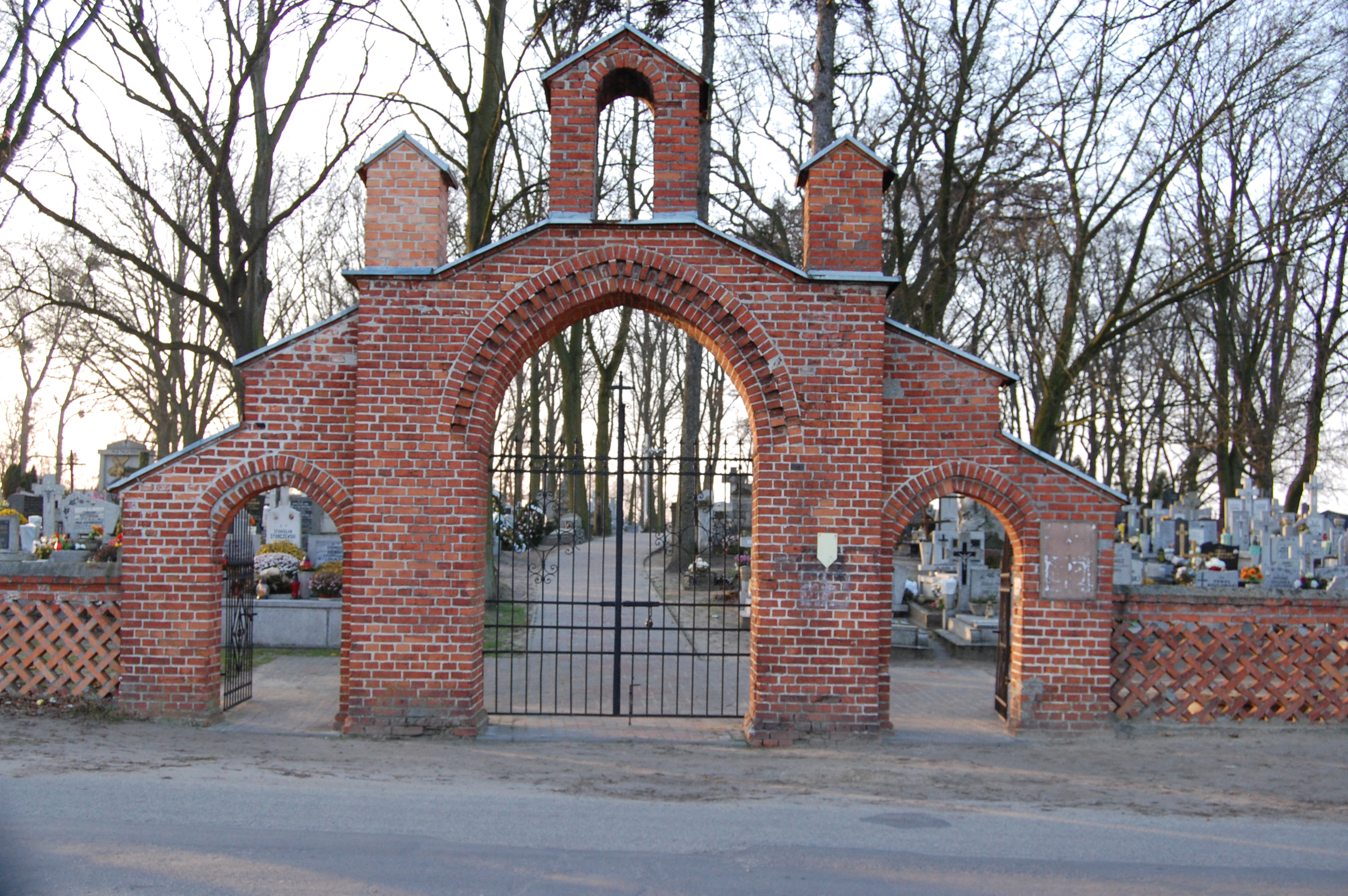
- Cemetery in Goszczewo

- Location within Poland
- Coordinates: 52°51′21″N 18°36′46″E
- Country: Poland
- Voivodeship: Kuyavian-Pomeranian
- County: Aleksandrów
- Gmina: Aleksandrów Kujawski
- Population: 150
- Time zone: UTC+1 (CET)
  - Summer (DST): UTC+2 (CEST)
- Vehicle registration: CAL

Goszczewo [ɡɔʂˈt͡ʂɛvɔ] is a village in the administrative district of Gmina Aleksandrów Kujawski, within Aleksandrów County, Kuyavian-Pomeranian Voivodeship, in north-central Poland. It is located on the southern shore of Lake Goszczewo in the region of Kuyavia.

== History ==
In 1827, the village had a population of 51.

During the German occupation of Poland (World War II), in 1939–1940, the occupiers carried out expulsions of Poles, whose farms were then handed over to Germans as part of the Lebensraum policy. Expelled Poles were either deported to the General Government in the more eastern part of German-occupied Poland or enslaved as forced labour of German colonists in the area.
