= Stara Wieś, Aleksandrów County =

Stara Wieś
- Village
- Location within Poland
- Coordinates: 52°51′28″N 18°40′36″E
- Country: Poland
- Voivodeship: Kuyavian-Pomeranian
- County: Aleksandrów
- Gmina: Aleksandrów Kujawski
- Population: 52

Stara Wieś [ˈstara ˈvʲɛɕ] is a village in the administrative district of Gmina Aleksandrów Kujawski, within Aleksandrów County, Kuyavian-Pomeranian Voivodeship, in north-central Poland.
