= Nowa Wieś, Aleksandrów County =

Nowa Wieś
- Village
- Location within Poland
- Coordinates: 52°51′56″N 18°39′55″E
- Country: Poland
- Voivodeship: Kuyavian-Pomeranian
- County: Aleksandrów
- Gmina: Aleksandrów Kujawski
- Population: 103

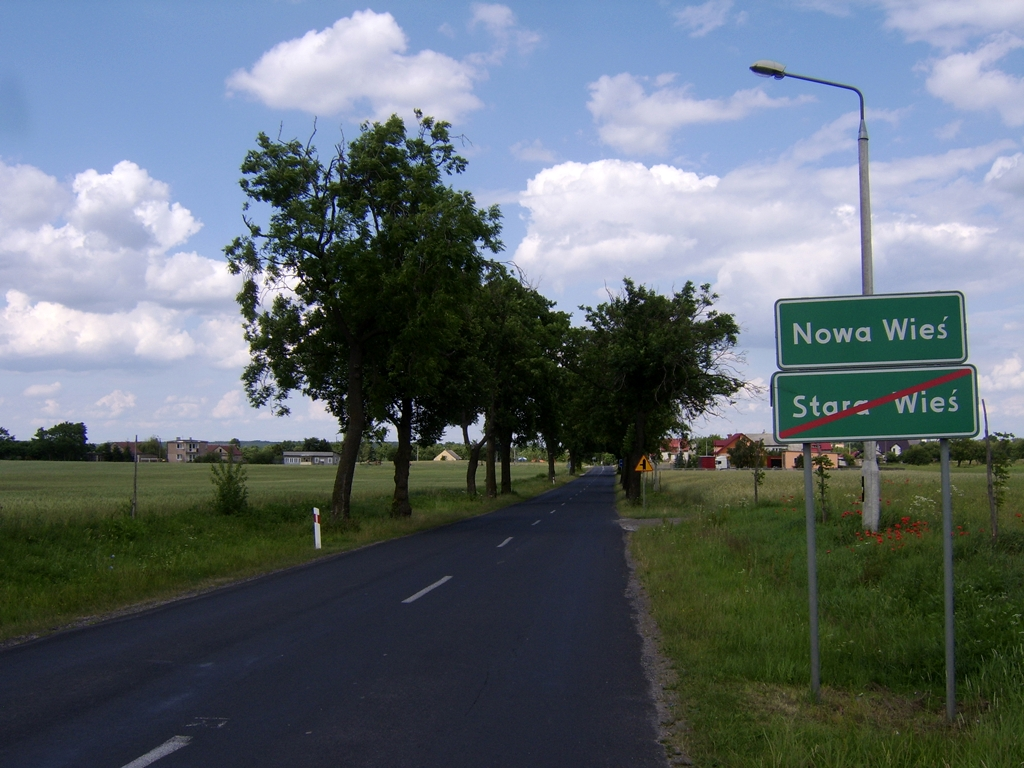
Nowa Wieś in 2011

Nowa Wieś [ˈnɔva ˈvʲɛɕ] is a village in the administrative district of Gmina Aleksandrów Kujawski, within Aleksandrów County, Kuyavian-Pomeranian Voivodeship, in north-central Poland.
