= Przybranowo =

- Village
- Location within Poland
- Coordinates: 52°50′N 18°39′E
- Country: Poland
- Voivodeship: Kuyavian-Pomeranian
- County: Aleksandrów
- Gmina: Aleksandrów Kujawski
- Population: 645
- Time zone: UTC+1 (CET)
  - Summer (DST): UTC+2 (CEST)
- Vehicle registration: CAL

Przybranowo [pʂɨbraˈnɔvɔ] is a village in the administrative district of Gmina Aleksandrów Kujawski, within Aleksandrów County, Kuyavian-Pomeranian Voivodeship, in north-central Poland. It is located in the region of Kuyavia.

== History ==
In 1827, the village had a population of 168.

Several Poles from Przybranowo were among the victims of a massacre committed by German troops in nearby Koneck during the German invasion of Poland at the start of World War II in September 1939 (see also: Nazi crimes against the Polish nation). During the subsequent German occupation, in 1939–1940, the occupiers carried out expulsions of Poles, whose farms were then handed over to Germans as part of the Lebensraum policy. Expelled Poles were either deported to the General Government in the more eastern part of German-occupied Poland or enslaved as forced labour by German colonists in the area.
