= Wawrzyniec Goślicki =

Polish bishop and author

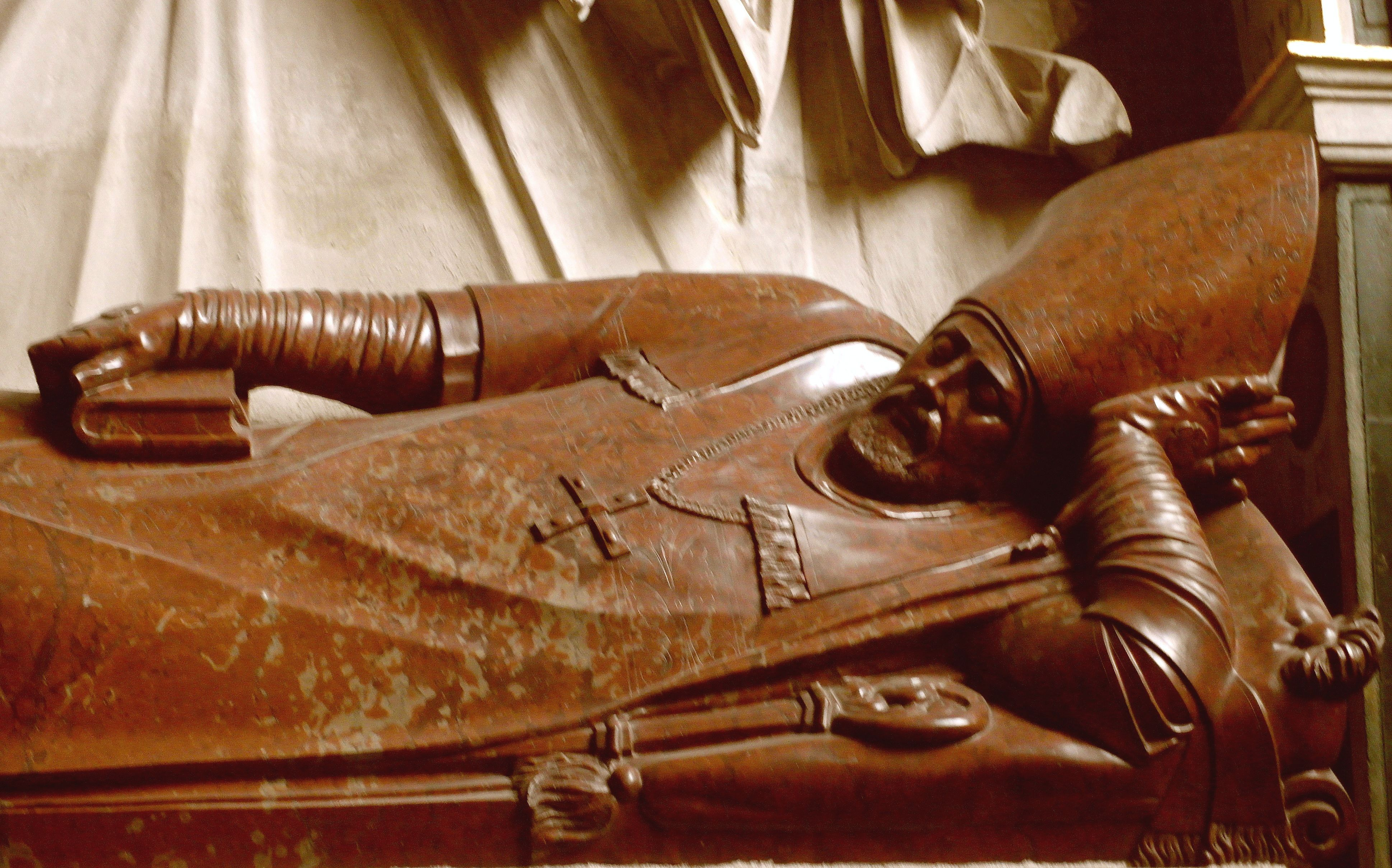
Tombstone (fragment) of the bishop Wawrzyniec Goślicki in the Poznań cathedral

Wawrzyniec Goślicki (between 1530 and 1540 – 31 October 1607), in Latin called Laurentius Grimaldius Goslicius, was a Polish nobleman, Bishop of Poznań (1601–1607), political thinker and philosopher best known for his 1568 book De optimo senatore.

== Biography ==
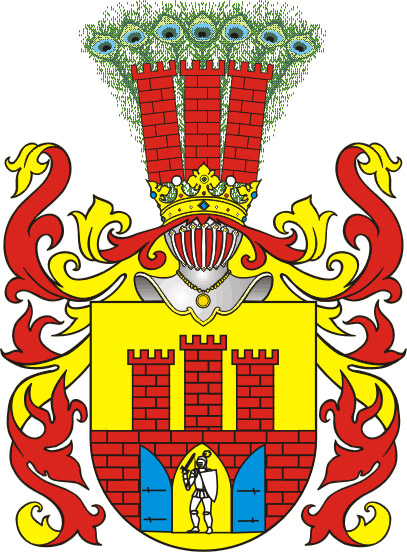
Grzymała coat-of-arms

He was the son of Paweł Goślicki and Ewa Kamieniecka. Born near Płock, after studying at Kraków's Jagiellonian University and at Padua and Bologna, he entered the Roman Catholic Church. In 1569 he joined the Polish royal chancery and as a secretary served two kings, Sigismund II Augustus and Stefan Batory, and was successively appointed bishop of Kamieniec Podolski (1586), Chełm (1590), Przemyśl (1591), and Poznań (1601). Goślicki was a man of affairs, highly esteemed by contemporaries, and frequently engaged in active politics. He was also a staunch advocate of religious tolerance in Poland. It was due to his influence and to a letter that he wrote to the Pope against the Jesuits that they were prevented from establishing schools at Kraków during his reign. He was the only prelate who, in 1587, acceded to the Warsaw Confederation.

Goślicki's Latin book De optimo senatore (published during his stay in Italy in Venice, 1568) and dedicated to King Zygmunt August, subsequently appeared in four English translations: as The Counsellor ( considered inaccurate) in 1598, A commonwealth of good counsaile in 1607, The Accomplished Senator... Done into English... By Mr. Oldisworth in 1733, and most recently as The Accomplished Senator in K. Thompson's translation in 1992. The book proved immensely important in Britain among forces opposed to the Tudor monarchy; it was widely quoted and cited in opposition pamphlets and leaflets during the period leading up to the British Civil Wars of the 1640s.

In this book Goślicki shows the ideal statesman who is well versed in the humanities as well as in economy, politics, and law. He argued that law is above the ruler, who must respect it, and that it is illegitimate to rule over a people against their will. He equated godliness with reason, and reason with law. Many of the book's ideas comprised the foundations of the Polish Nobles' Democracy (1505–1795) and were based on 14th-century writings by Stanisław of Skarbimierz. The book was not translated into Polish for 400 years.

The book was influential abroad, exporting the ideas of Poland's Golden Freedom and democratic system. It was a political and social classic, widely read and long popular in England after its 1598 translation; read by Elizabeth I of England, it was also known by Shakespeare, who used his depiction of a senator as a model for Polonius in Hamlet. Its ideas might be seen in the turmoil that gripped England around the times of the Glorious Revolution. Goślicki's ideas were perhaps suggestive for future national constitutions. He never wrote that "all men are created equal," but did say, "Sometimes a people, justly provoked and irritated, by the Tyranny and Usurpations of their Kings, take upon themselves the undoubted Right of vindicating their own liberties." The book was allegedly read by Robert Bellarmine, Algernon Sydney and Thomas Jefferson (who had it in his library), but there is no evidence of a direct link with Jefferson's Declaration of Independence.

Goślicki argued that distinguished senators were more useful to a state than the king or the common people:

For the king, being alone, cannot see everything and it often happens that either he yields to desires or his emotions disturb his ability of discretion. Also an ignorant crowd without a thought and head (as a proverb says) cannot by any means possess such prudence, while the senate, composed of men distinguished by virtue, prudence, and glory of accomplished deeds is capable from its middle position, as if from an observation point, of caring for the common weal of the state, perceiving those matters which are beneficial, and freeing it from disturbances, rebellions, and dangers.

He was an influence in the framing the Polish Constitution of 3 May 1791, which historian Norman Davies calls "the first constitution of its kind in Europe".

== See also ==
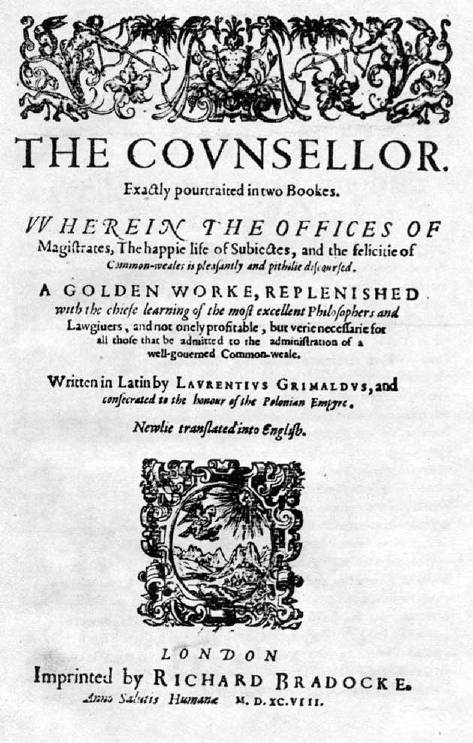
The title page to Goślicki's The Counsellor from 1598

- Polish–Lithuanian Commonwealth
- Szlachta
- Sarmatism
- Andrzej Frycz Modrzewski
- Andrzej Maksymilian Fredro

| Preceded by Jan Tarnowski | Bishop of Poznań; 1601–1607 | Succeeded by Andrzej Opaleński |
