= Opoki, Russia =

Opoki (Russian: Опоки) is the name of several rural localities in Russia.

== Modern rural localities ==
- Opoki, Pskov Oblast, a village in Porkhovsky District of Pskov Oblast

== Abolished rural localities ==
- Opoki, Vologda Oblast, a former village in Vologda Oblast
