= Chlebowo, Brodnica County =

Chlebowo
- Village
- Location within Poland
- Coordinates: 53°9′9″N 19°30′37″E
- Country: Poland
- Voivodeship: Kuyavian-Pomeranian
- County: Brodnica
- Gmina: Świedziebnia
- Population: 160

Chlebowo [xlɛˈbɔvɔ] is a village in the administrative district of Gmina Świedziebnia, within Brodnica County, Kuyavian-Pomeranian Voivodeship, in north-central Poland.
