= Łazieniec =

- Village
- Location within Poland
- Coordinates: 52°52′18″N 18°42′58″E
- Country: Poland
- Voivodeship: Kuyavian-Pomeranian
- County: Aleksandrów
- Gmina: Aleksandrów Kujawski

Łazieniec [waˈʑɛɲɛt͡s] is a village in the administrative district of Gmina Aleksandrów Kujawski, within Aleksandrów County, Kuyavian-Pomeranian Voivodeship, in north-central Poland.
