= Plebanka, Gmina Aleksandrów Kujawski =

Plebanka
- Village
- Location within Poland
- Coordinates: 52°50′26″N 18°42′30″E
- Country: Poland
- Voivodeship: Kuyavian-Pomeranian
- County: Aleksandrów
- Gmina: Aleksandrów Kujawski
- Population: 247

Plebanka [plɛˈbaŋka] is a village in the administrative district of Gmina Aleksandrów Kujawski, within Aleksandrów County, Kuyavian-Pomeranian Voivodeship, in north-central Poland.
