= De optimo senatore =

1568 book by Wawrzyniec Goślicki

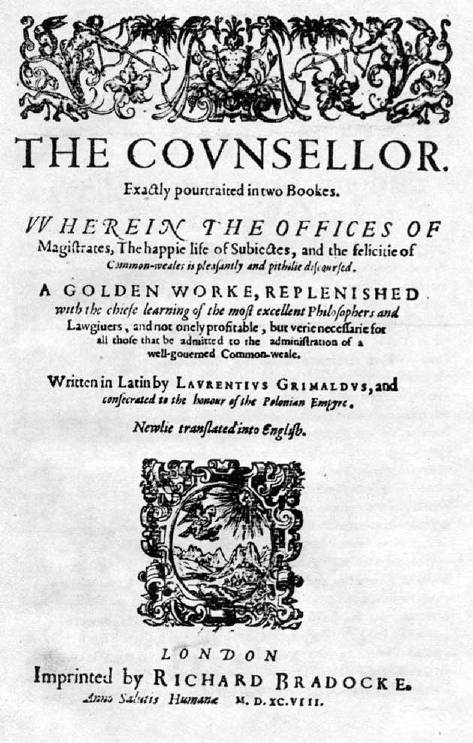
The Counsellor, an English translation published in 1598

De optimo senatore (also The Counsellor and The Accomplished Senator) was a book written by Wawrzyniec Goślicki (known in Latin as Goslicius), The book was first published in Venice in 1568, later republished in Basel (1593), and then translated into English and published in 1598 and in 1607.

Written in Latin and dedicated to the Polish King Sigismund II Augustus, the book describes the ideal statesman who is well versed in the humanities, as well as in economy, politics, and law. This theoretical treatise on the art of ruling postulated the importance of the senate as a body mediating between the monarch's absolute tendencies and noblemen's attempts to acquire more power.

It was a political and social classic, widely read at the time of its publication.

== Bibliography ==
1. Aleksander Stępkowski (red.) O senatorze doskonałym studia Warszawa, Kancelaria Senatu 2009.
2. Teresa Bałuk-Ulewiczowa, Goslicius' Ideal Senator and His Impact over the Centuries: Shakespearean Reflections. Kraków, PAU i UJ 2009.
