= Michał Hieronim Leszczyc-Sumiński =

Polish botanist, painter and art collector

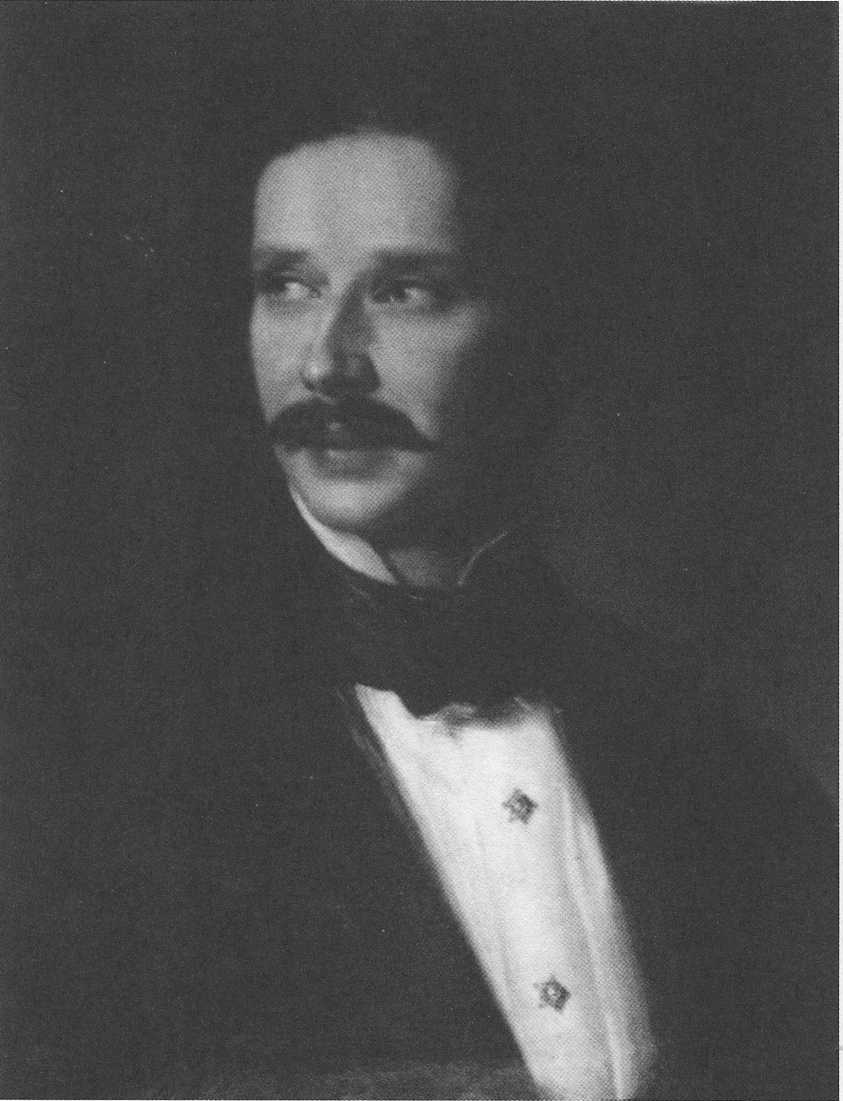
Purported self-portrait from circa 1852

Michal Hieronim Leszczyc-Suminski (30 September 1820 – 26 May 1898) was a Polish botanist, painter and art collector. He was an alumnus of Humboldt University of Berlin.

== Biography ==
Leszczyc-Suminski was born on 30 September 1820 in Ośno. He married Anne Hudson (1830–1874), the daughter of George Hudson, the so-called Railway King of England.

Leszczyc-Suminski died on 26 May 1898 in Tharandt at the age of 77.

== Scientific achievements ==
He made significant discoveries regarding the reproduction of ferns.

- Zur Entwickelungs-Geschichte der Farrnkräuter (German) (English, The Evolution of Ferns (1848).

== Art ==
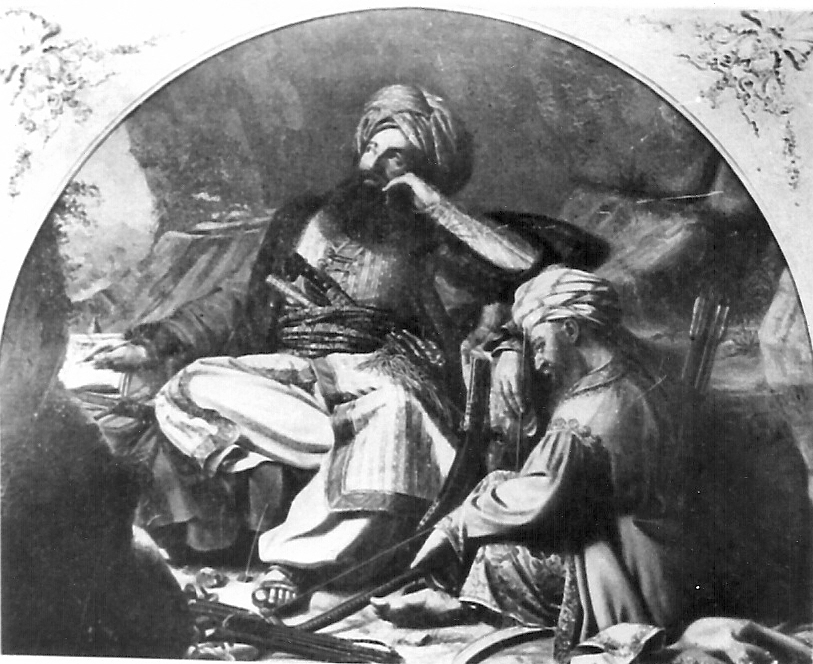
Depiction of Muhammad writing the Quran
