= Tomasz Tomka =

Polish bishop

Tomasz Tomka was thirteenth century Bishop of Płock, Poland. He was Bishop from 1271 till 1294.

He may have been of Prussian descent, although medieval Chronicler, Jan Długosz claims Polish origines. He had at least a school level education, and may have obtained a university degree, as Jan Długosz considered him to be a scholar.

He was Chancellor for Siemowit I of Masovia from before 21 April 1256 and in a document dated 19 November 1257 was Canon to Andrzej Ciołek the Bishop of Płock. and was made bishop himself in 1271.

In 1282 he visited Pomerania, and he lived until sometime after 6 May 1294.

Religious titles
Preceded by Piotr Niedlich	Bishop of Płock; 1271-1294	Succeeded by Gedko II
